= Ferrara (surname) =

Ferrara is an Italian surname. Notable people with the surname include:

- Abel Ferrara (born 1951), American film director
- Adam Ferrara (born 1966), American actor and comedian
- Al Ferrara (1939–2024), American baseball player
- Alessandro Ferrara (born 1953), Italian philosopher
- Antonella Ferrara (born 1963), Italian control theorist and engineer
- Antonio Ferrara (1912–?), Argentine footballer
- Christopher Ferrara (born 1952) American attorney, anti-abortion activist, and journalist
- Ciro Ferrara (born 1967), Italian football player
- Donna Ferrara (born 1959), New York politician
- Ed Ferrara (born 1966), American wrestling booker
- Eric Ferrara (born 1970), American author, researcher, movie & television consultant
- Fernando Ferrara (born 1968), Argentine field hockey player
- Franco Ferrara (1911–1985), Italian conductor
- Giacomo Ferrara (born 1990), Italian actor
- Jackie Ferrara (1929–2025), American sculptor
- Jean-Jacques Ferrara (born 1967), French politician
- Jerry Ferrara (born 1979), American actor
- Jon V. Ferrara (born 1960), American entrepreneur
- Juan Ferrara (born 1943) Mexican telenovela and film actor
- Katherine Ferrara, American engineer
- Manuel Ferrara (born 1975), French-Spanish pornographic actor
- Mike Ferrara (born 1958), American basketball player
- Napoleone Ferrara (born 1956), Italian-American molecular biologist
- Nicola Ferrara (1910–?), Argentine football player
- Paul Ferrara (born 1939), American photographer
- Paul B. Ferrara (1942–2011), American DNA scientist
- Peter Ferrara (born 1955), American lawyer and activist
- Rosina Ferrara (1861–1934), model to 19th-century American and British painters, muse of John Singer Sargent
- Stéphane Ferrara (born 1956), French boxer and actor
- Theresa Ferrara (1951–1979), Italian-American criminal, associate of the Lucchese-Family
- Tony Ferrara (1927–2009), American baseball player, coach, and scout
- Vincent M. Ferrara (born 1949) Italian-American mobster

== See also ==
- Riccobaldo of Ferrara (1246 – after 1320), Italian notary and writer
- Giacomo Andrea da Ferrara (died 1500), architect active in Milan; the author on a commentary on Vitruvius
- Ferrara (disambiguation)
- Ferrari (surname)
- Ferraris (surname)
- Ferraro
- Ferrera (surname)
- Ferrero (surname)
- Fabbri (surname)
