= Metalsmith =

Craftsman fashioning tools or works of art out of various metals

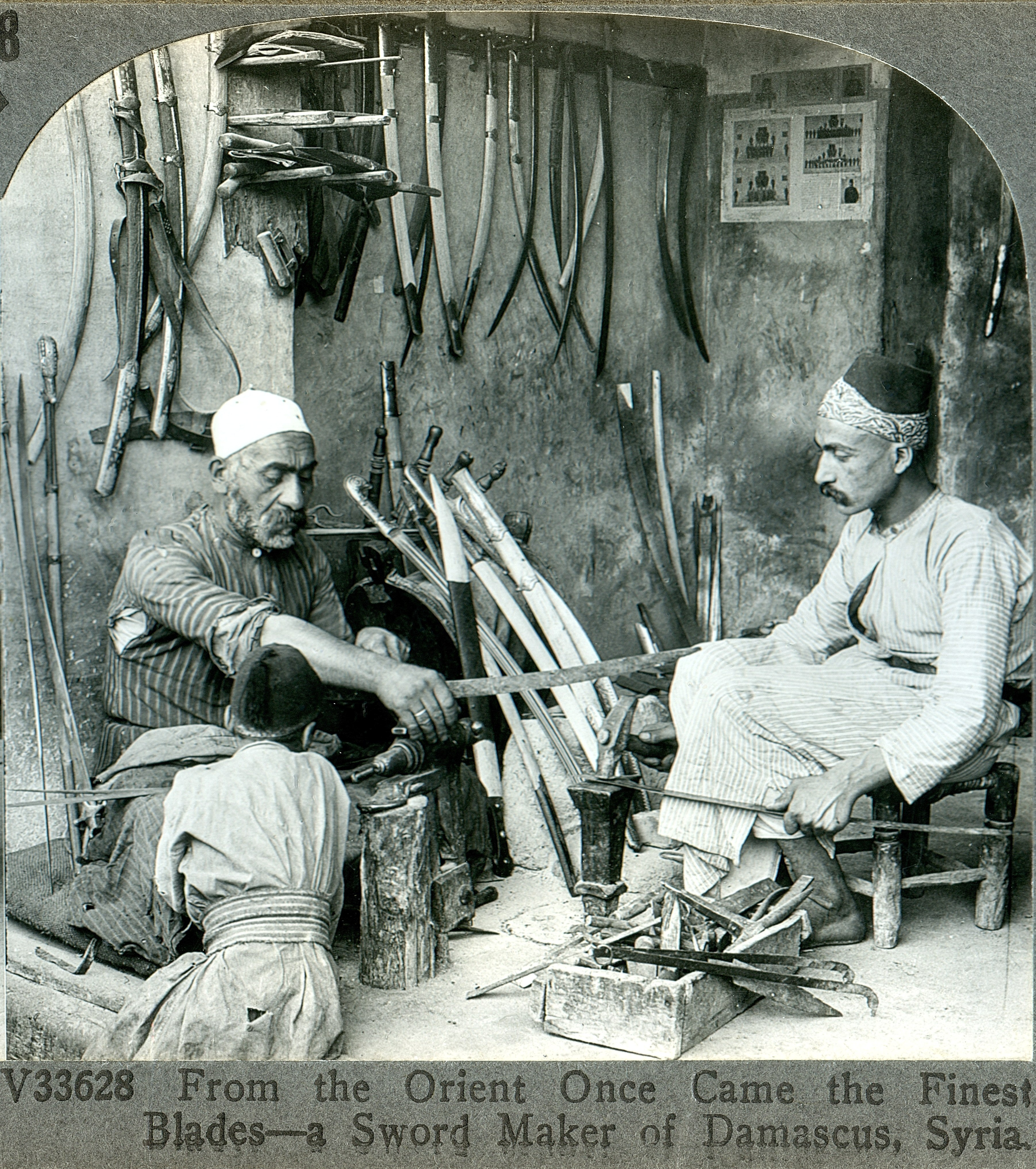
A bladesmith from Damascus, c. 1900

A metalsmith or simply smith is a craftsperson fashioning useful items (for example, tools, kitchenware, tableware, jewelry, armor and weapons) out of various metals. Smithing is one of the oldest metalworking occupations. Shaping metal with a hammer (forging) is the archetypical component of smithing. Often the hammering is done while the metal is hot, having been heated in a forge. Smithing can also involve the other aspects of metalworking, such as refining metals from their ores (traditionally done by smelting), casting it into shapes (founding), and filing to shape and size.

The prevalence of metalworking in the culture of recent centuries has led Smith and its equivalents in various languages to be a common occupational surname (German Schmidt or Schmied, Portuguese Ferreiro, Ferreira, French Lefèvre, Spanish Herrero, Italian Fabbri, Ferrari, Ferrero, Ukrainian Koval etc.). As a suffix, -smith connotes the meaning of a specialized craftsperson—for example, wordsmith, meaning one who "smiths words", i.e. a writer.

== History ==
In pre-industrialized times, smiths held high or special social standing since they supplied the metal tools needed for farming (especially the plough) and warfare.

== Types of smiths ==
A metalsmith is one who works with or has the knowledge and the capacity of working with "all" metals.

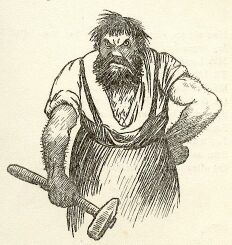
Illustration by Theodor Kittelsen for Johan Herman Wessel's The Smith and the Baker

Types of smiths include:

- Metal smiths
  - A blacksmith works with iron and steel (this is what is usually meant when referring just to "smith"). A farrier is a type of blacksmith who specializes in making and fitting horseshoes.
  - A brownsmith works with copper, as well as other copper-based alloys. A coppersmith works with only copper.
  - A goldsmith works with gold.
  - A whitesmith works with white metal (tin and pewter) and can refer to someone who polishes or finishes the metal rather than forging it. A tinsmith, tinner, or tinker works with light metal (such as tinware) and can refer to someone who deals in tinware.
    - A tinker is an archaic term for an itinerant tinsmith.
  - A silversmith, or brightsmith, works with silver.
- A weaponsmith is a generalized bladesmith who forges weapons like axes, spears, flails, and other weapons.
  - A bladesmith forges knives, swords, and other blades. A swordsmith is a bladesmith who forges only swords.
  - An arrowsmith is a blacksmith who specialises in forging arrowheads.
  - A gunsmith builds and repairs firearms.
- An armourer working in an armoury maintaining and repairing small weapons traditionally had some duties of a gunsmith.
- A coinsmith works strictly with coins and currency.
- A locksmith works with locks.
- A coppersmith works with copper, shaping and forming it into vessels, tools, decorative objects, and other products.

== Artisans and craftspeople ==
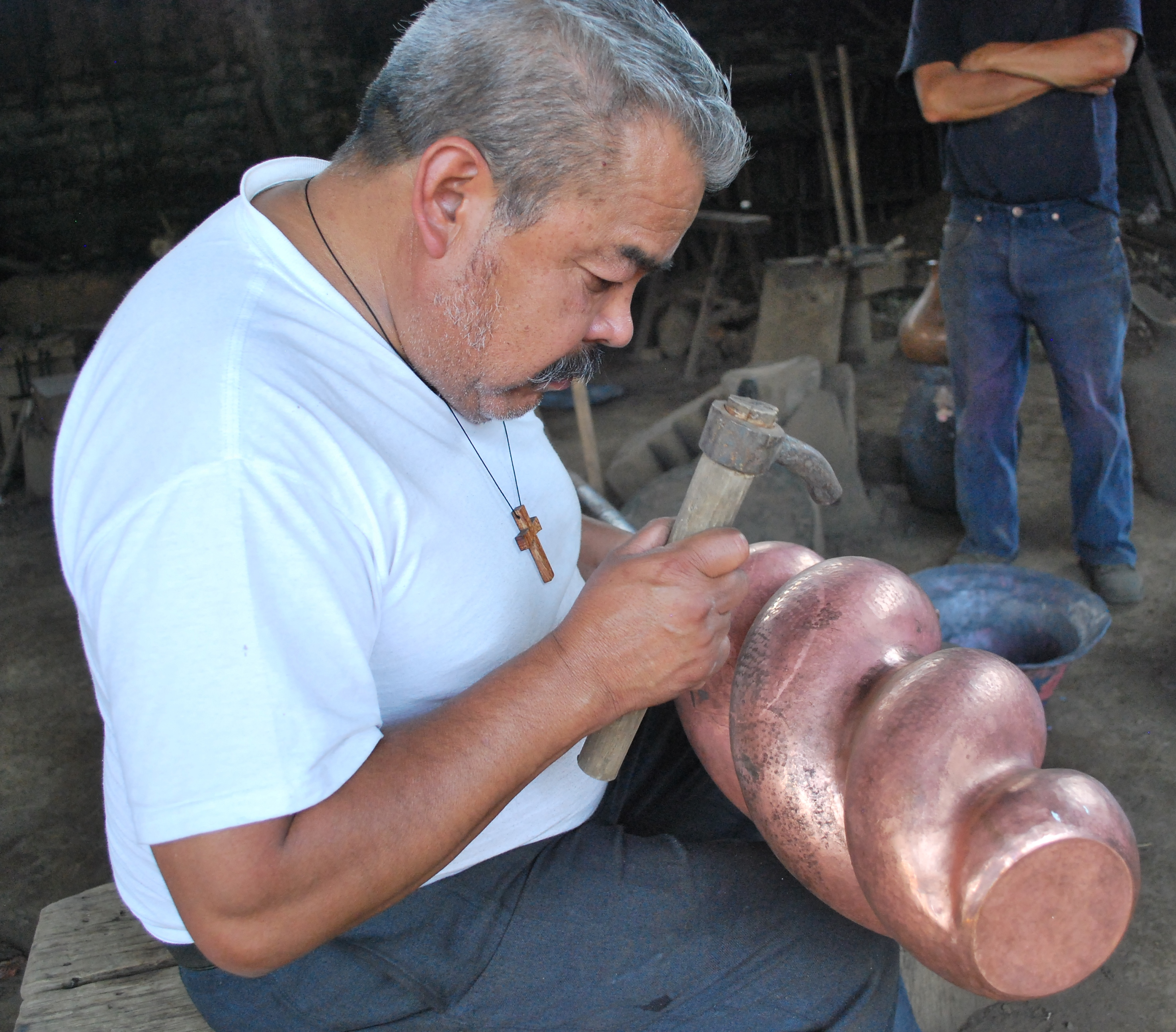
Coppersmith Abdón Punzo in his workshop in Santa Clara del Cobre, Mexico

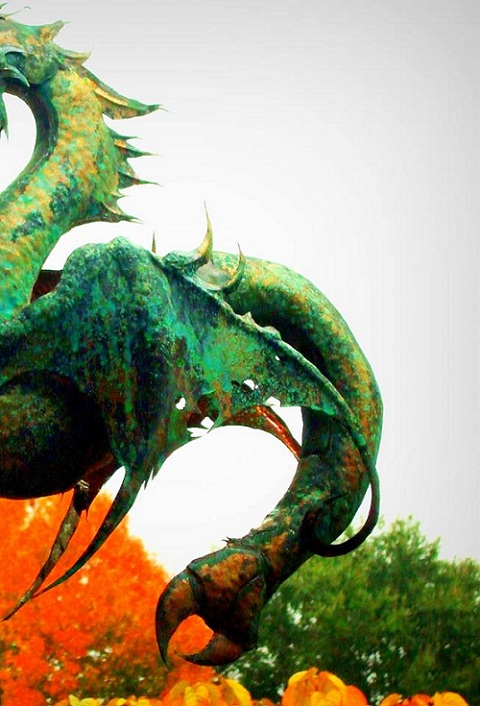
"Aeolus's Weathervane" – detail of a weather vane created by using a variety of metalsmithing techniques

The ancient traditional tool of the smith is a forge or smithy, which is a furnace designed to allow compressed air (through a bellows) to superheat the inside, allowing for efficient melting, soldering and annealing of metals. Today, this tool is still widely used by blacksmiths as it was traditionally.

The term, metalsmith, often refers to artisans and craftspersons who practice their craft in many different metals, including gold, copper and silver. Jewelers often refer to their craft as metalsmithing, and many universities offer degree programs in metalsmithing, jewelry, enameling and blacksmithing under the auspices of their fine arts programs.

== Machinists ==
Machinists are metalsmiths who produce high-precision parts and tools. The most advanced of these tools, CNC machines, are computer controlled and largely automated.

== See also ==
- Ferrous metallurgy
- Smithing gods
- Metallurgy
- Blacksmith
