= Ferreira (surname) =

Ferreira (Latin ferraria and ferrus) is a Portuguese and Galician toponymic and occupational surname, meaning "iron mine" (name of several locations in Portugal) and also the feminine variant of "blacksmith" ("ferreiro"), related to ironworks.

The variants Ferreiro, Ferreiró, Ferreiros, Ferro, or Ferraria are less common. Like Smith in English or Schmidt in German, Favre in France, Kovalenko in Ukraine, Kuznetsov in Russia, Ferrari in Italy, Kowalski in Poland, this Portuguese equivalent surname is one of the most common in the country. This surname exists mainly in Lusophone countries, South Africa, and also, via Galician migration, in Spanish speaking countries and numerous other nations around the world.

== Jewish Origin ==
Ferreira is also a Sephardic Jewish surname, originating from the settlement of Jews in the Iberian peninsula due to the Roman exile of 70CE and eventual settlement in what is now present day Portugal and Galicia. During the time of the Spanish Inquisition and eventual inquisition in Portugal, many New Christian families took the surname to hide their Jewish identity.

== General ==
=== A-E ===
- Abigail Izquierdo Ferreira (1922–2019), known as Bibi Ferreira, Brazilian actress, singer, and director
- Alexandre Rodrigues Ferreira (1756–1815), Portuguese naturalist
- Aloysio Nunes Ferreira (born 1945), Brazilian lawyer and politician
- Ana Gomes Ferreira (born 1987), Portuguese-born singer, musician, songwriter – known as "Ana Free"
- Anne Ferreira (born 1961), French politician
- António Ferreira (poet) (1528–1569), Portuguese poet and writer
- Augusto Barros Ferreira (1929–1998), Portuguese painter also known as Barros, and Augusto Barros
- Aurélio Buarque de Holanda Ferreira (1910–1989), Brazilian dictionarist and writer
- Barbara Linhares Ferreira (born 1996), American model and actress
- Ben Ferreira (born 1979), Canadian former competitive figure skater
- Benigno Ferreira (1846–1920), Paraguayan president
- Carlos Alberto Ferreira Braga (1907–2006), Brazilian songwriter and singer
- Carlos Eduardo Moreira Ferreira (1939–2022), Brazilian businessman and politician
- Carlos Vaz Ferreira (1872–1958), Uruguayan philosopher, writer, and academic
- Carlota Ferreira (1838 – c. 1912), Uruguayan portrait subject
- Cid Ferreira Gomes (born 1963), Brazilian politician, Senator for the state of Ceará
- Cristóvão Ferreira (1580–1650), Portuguese Jesuit missionary to Japan who became an apostate
- David Mourão-Ferreira (1927–1996), Portuguese writer and poet
- Edemar Cid Ferreira (born 1943), Brazilian economist and former head of Banco Santos
- Elisa Ferreira (born 1955), Portuguese politician, current vice-governor of the Bank of Portugal
- Elizabeth Ferreira, American politician
- Enéas Ferreira Carneiro (1938–2007), Brazilian cardiologist, founder of the Party of the Reconstruction of the National Order
- Expedita Ferreira (born 1932), only known child of Lampião and Maria Bonita.

=== F-J ===
- Fátima Ferreira (born 1959), Brazilian biologist and biochemist
- Francisco Ferreira Drummond (1796–1858), Portuguese historiographer, paleographer, musician, and politician
- Francisco Joaquim Ferreira do Amaral (1843–1923), Portuguese naval commander and politician
- Gabriel Arcanjo Ferreira da Costa (born 1954), Prime Minister of São Tomé and Príncipe (2012–2014)
- Gerrit Ferreira (born 1948), South African businessman
- Hendrik C. Ferreira, South-African professor, digital communications and information theory
- Hugo Ferreira (born 1974), Angolan-born Portuguese-American musician
- Ignatius Ferreira (1840–1921), South African soldier, fortune hunter, and gold miner
- Ignatius Stephanus Ferreira ("Naas Ferreira", 1844–1900), Second Boer War general
- Jack Ferreira (born 1944), former American ice hockey executive
- Jesús Reyes Ferreira (1880–1977), self-taught artist and antiques/art collector and vendor
- Joachim Johannes Ferreira (1835–1917), commandant in the First Boer War
- Gilmar Ferreira Mendes (born 1955), Brazilian judge of the Supremo Tribunal Federal
- João Ferreira (politician) (born 1978), Portuguese biologist and former member of the European Parliament
- João Ferreira Franco Pinto Castelo-Branco (1855–1929), Portuguese 73rd Prime Minister
- João Maria Ferreira do Amaral (1803–1849), Portuguese military officer and governor of Macau
- Joaquim Ferreira de Mello, Roman Catholic Archbishop of Pelotas (1921–1940)
- José Dias Ferreira (1837–1909), Portuguese lawyer, politician, and jurist
- José dos Santos Ferreira (1919–1993), known as "Adé", Portuguese-Macanese poet
- Jose Fernando Ferreira Mendes (born 1962), Portuguese statistical physicist in the field of network theory
- José Maria Ferreira de Castro (1898–1974), Portuguese writer and journalist
- José Ornella Ferreira, Venezuelan military officer
- José Ribamar Ferreira de Araújo Costa (born 1930), Brazilian lawyer and writer, 31st President of Brazil
- José Vicente Concha Ferreira (1869–1929), President of Colombia from 1914 to 1918

=== L-V ===
- Laurence Ferreira Barbosa (born 1958), French film director and screenwriter
- Lopo Fortunato Ferreira do Nascimento (born 1942), Prime Minister of Angola (1975–78)
- Louis Ferreira, Portuguese Canadian actor
- Luís Ferreira Filipe Vieira (born 1949), Portuguese real estate businessman
- Maria Adelaide Mengas Matafome Ferreira (born 1959), Portuguese singer
- María Eugenia Vaz Ferreira (1875–1924), Uruguayan teacher and poet
- Matheus Silva Ferreira da Costa (born 1987), Brazilian football manager
- Nadia Ferreira (born 1999), Paraguayan model
- Paul Ferreira (born 1973), Canadian populist politician
- Ramona Ferreira, Paraguayan journalist and feminist
- R.A.P. Ferreira (born 1992), American rapper and producer
- Sérgio Henrique Ferreira (1934–2016), Brazilian pharmacologist
- Sky Ferreira (born 1992), singer
- Teresa Simões-Ferreira Heinz (born 1938), Portuguese-American businesswoman and philanthropist
- Vergílio Ferreira (1916–1996), Portuguese writer
- Virgulino Ferreira da Silva (1897–1938), known as Lampião, the leader of the Cangaço, a banditry of the Brazilian Northeast

== Sportspeople ==
- Abel Fernando Moreira Ferreira (born 1978), Portuguese manager and retired football right back
- Adenízia Ferreira da Silva (born 1986), Brazilian volleyball middle blocker
- Adhemar Ferreira da Silva (1927–2001), Brazilian triple jumper
- Adriano Ferreira (born 1974), former professional tennis player from Brazil
- Ailton Ferreira Silva, Brazilian professional football left-back
- Aldemir dos Santos Ferreira (born 1997), Brazilian footballer
- Alessandro Ferreira Leonardo (born 1987), commonly known as Sandro, Hong Kong football player
- Alexandre Ferreira (fighter), Brazilian professional mixed martial artist
- Alison Lopes Ferreira (born 1993), Brazilian football defensive midfielder
- Andries Stephanus Ferreira (born 1990), South African rugby unionplayer
- Amber Ferreira (born 1982), American triathlete, coach, and endurance athlete
- Andre Ferreira Teixeira (born 1993), Portuguese football right back
- André Filipe Ferreira Coelho Pereira (born 1995), Portuguese professional football forward
- Bismark de Araújo Ferreira (born 1993), Brazilian football winger
- Carlos Diego Ferreira (born 1985), Brazilian mixed martial artist
- Carlos Eduardo Ferreira Batista (born 1992), known as Kakà, Portuguese football left back
- Carlos Eduardo Ferreira de Souza (born 1996), known as Carlos Eduardo, Brazilian football forward
- Claudemir Ferreira da Silva (born 1984), Brazilian footballer
- Douglas Ferreira (footballer) (born 1986), Brazilian footballer
- Donovan Ferreira (born 1998), South African cricketer
- Edvaldo Ferreira (born 1990), Angolan handball player
- Elizeu Antônio Ferreira Vinagre Godoy (born 1945), Brazilian former footballer
- Emerson Ferreira (born 1976), Brazilian football defensive midfielder
- Emerson Ferreira da Rosa (born 1976), known as "Emerson", Brazilian footballer
- Eusébio da Silva Ferreira (1942–2014), Portuguese footballer
- Evander da Silva Ferreira (born 1998), Brazilian football attacking midfielder
- Evanílson Aparecido Ferreira (born1975), Brazilian retired footballer
- Everaldo Ferreira Magalhaes (born 1982), Brazilian soccer player
- Fábio Miguel Lourenço Ferreira (born 1989), Portuguese professional footballer
- Filipe Miguel Neves Ferreira (born 1990), Portuguese footballer
- Francisco Ferreira (footballer, born 1997), known as Ferro, Portuguese professional football centre-back
- Frederico Ferreira Silva, Portuguese tennis player
- Gabriel Vasconcelos Ferreira (born 1992), Brazilian footballer
- Gonçalo Nuno Borges Ferreira Gomes Alves (born 1977), Portuguese futsal defender
- Guilherme Ferreira Pinto (born 1992), Brazilian footballer
- Hélder José Castro Ferreira (born 1997), Portuguese professional football left winger
- Heron Ferreira (born 1958), known as Heron, Brazilian professional football manager
- Hugo Miguel Ferreira Gomes Viana (born 1983), Portuguese retired professional football central midfielder
- Hugo Ventura Ferreira Moura Guedes (born 1988), Portuguese football goalkeeper
- Italo Ferreira (born 1994), Brazilian professional surfer
- Ivo Daniel Ferreira Mendonça Pinto (born 1990), Portuguese professional football right back
- Jacksen Ferreira Tiago (born 1968), Brazilian retired footballer
- Jael Ferreira (born 1988), Brazilian football striker
- Jesualdo Ferreira (born 1946), Portuguese football coach
- Jesús Ferreira (born 2000), Colombian-born American soccer player
- João António Ferreira Resende Alves (born 1952), Portuguese former footballer and coach
- Joaquim Rodrigues Ferreira (born unknown-deceased), former Portuguese footballer who played as defender.
- Jorge Isaac Baltazar Ferreira (born 1982), known as "Jorge Baltazar", Mexican squash player
- Jorge Ferreira da Silva (born 1967), retired Brazilian footballer
- José Albano Ferreira Mota (born 1964), Portuguese retired football right back
- Jose Carlos Ferreira Filho (born 1983), known as Zè Carlos, Brazilian professional football striker
- José Ferreira Neto (born 1966), known as "Neto", Brazilian footballer
- Jose Marcelo Ferreira (born 1973), known as Zè Maria, retired Brazilian football player and was manager
- Jose Ferreira Franco (1934–2009), Brazilian former football (soccer) player
- José Leandro de Souza Ferreira (born 1959), Brazilian former football defender
- José Nadson Ferreira (born 1984), known as Nadson, Brazilian football centre-back
- Júlio Alexandre Bacelar Oliveira Ferreira (born 1994), Portuguese taekwondo practitioner
- Kepler Laveran Lima Ferreira (born 1983), Portuguese professional footballer in the role of centre back
- Leonardo Ferreira da Silva (born 1980), Brazilian football striker
- Lucimar Ferreira da Silva (born 1978), Brazilian football central defender
- Luiz Carlos Ferreira (born 1958), known as Luizinho, Brazilian former footballer
- Luis de Souza Ferreira (1908–2008), Peruvian football forward player
- Lula Ferreira (born 1951), Brazilian basketball coach
- Mádson Ferreira dos Santos (born 1992), Brazilian football right back
- Manuel Ferreira (footballer) (1905–1983), an Argentine footballer
- Manuel José Ferreira da Silva Barbosa (born 1951), Portuguese football manager and a former player
- Mara Ferreira Leão (born 1991), Brazilian volleyball player
- Marcelo Augusto Ferreira Teixeira (born 1987), Brazilian professional football defender
- Marcelo Ferreira (born 1965), Brazilian sailor and Olympic champion
- Marcelo Ferreira Martins (born 1975), Brazilian and naturalized Honduran former football player
- Marcelo Oliveira Ferreira (born 1987), Brazilian professional footballer
- Márcio Rafael Ferreira de Souza (born 1985), known as Rafinha, Brazilian football right back
- Marcio Ferreira Nobre (born 1980), known as Mert Nobre, Brazilian origin Turkish former football striker
- Marco Ferreira (footballer) (born 1978), Portuguese footballer
- Marco Júlio Castanheira Afonso Alves Ferreira (born 1978), retired Portuguese football winger
- Maria Conceição da Costa Ferreira (born 1962), retired Portuguese long-distance runner
- Mariano Ferreira Filho (born 1986), Brazilian professional football right back
- Michael Ferreira (born 1938), Indian player of English billiards
- Miguel Ferreira de Almeida (born 1949), Brazilian footballer
- Monique Ferreira (born 1980), Brazilian freestyle swimmer
- Neil Ferreira (born 1979), Zimbabwean cricketer
- Nelson Ferreira (footballer) (born 1982), Swiss and Portuguese footballer
- Nílton Ferreira Júnior (born 1987), simply known as Nílton, Brazilian football defensive midfielder
- Nivaldo Rodrigues Ferreira (born 1988), Brazilian football midfielder
- Paulo Ferreira (born 1979), Portuguese footballer
- Quentin Ferreira (born 1972), South African cricketer
- Rafael Alexandre Fernandes Ferreira Silva (born 1993), Portuguese football attacking midfielder
- Raimundo Ferreira Ramos (born 1970), known as Júnior Baiano, retired Brazilian football defender
- Raúl Fragoso Ferreira Duarte (born 1963), Angolan basketball coach
- Reginaldo Ferreira (born 1983), Brazilian professional football player
- Ricardo Ferreira da Silva (born 1984), Brazilian professional football left back
- Ricardo Jorge Ferreira Pinto da Silva (born 1980), Cape Verdean professional football central defender or right back
- Ricardo José Araújo Ferreira (born 1992), Portuguese professional football central defender
- Ricardo Manuel Ferreira Sousa (born 1981), known as Cadú, Portuguese professional football central defender
- Rivaldo Vítor Borba Ferreira Júnior (born 1995), known as Rivaldinho, is a Brazilian professional football forward
- Rogério Moraes Ferreira (born 1994), Brazilian handball player
- Rolando Ferreira Júnior (born 1964), retired Brazilian professional basketball player and coach
- Rúben Rafael Sousa Ferreira (born 1990), Portuguese professional footballer
- Schalk Jakobus Petrus Ferreira (born 1984), South African rugby union player
- Sebastián Ferreira Vidal (born 1998), Paraguayan football player
- Severino Ferreira de Barros (born 1985), Brazilian football goalkeeper
- Silvio (Silvio Manuel Azevedo Ferreira Sá Pereira) (born 1987), Portuguese professional football defender
- Tânia Ferreira (born 1974), Brazilian judoka
- Teófilo Ferreira (born 1973), Brazilian freestyle swimmer
- Thiago Heleno Henrique Ferreira Iborn 1988), Brazilian football central defender
- Tiago Ferreira (born 1975), known as "Tiago", Portuguese footballer
- Tiago Ferreira (born 1993), Portuguese footballer
- Vicente Ferreira Pastinha (1889–1981), mestre of the Brazilian martial art Capoeira
- Victor Ramos Ferreira (born 1989), Brazilian football central defender
- Virgilio Ferreira Romero (born 1973), retired Paraguayan football midfielder
- Vítor Borba Ferreira (born 1972), known as Rivaldo, Brazilian former professional footballer
- Wágner Ferreira dos Santos (born 1985), Brazilian football player
- Wanderson Ferreira de Oliveira (born 1984), known as Valdívia, Brazilian football attacking midfielder
- Wayne Ferreira (born 1971), South African tennis player
- Wesley Moraes Ferreira Da Silva (born 1996), Brazilian professional football centre forward
- William Ferreira Martínez (born 1983), Uruguayan football striker
- Yannick Ferreira Carrasco (born 1993), Belgian footballer

== Fictional ==
- Ferreira family, characters in EastEnders

== See also ==
- Marquis of Ferreira, Portuguese title of nobility created by a royal decree in 1533
- Herrera (surname), a related Spanish surname
- Laferrière (surname), a related French surname
- Ferreyra, Ferreiro, Ferrero, Ferrer, Ferraro, similar Italian-origin surnames also meaning "smith"
- Pires Ferreira family, an influential family from Brazil
