= Ferrera (disambiguation) =

Ferrera is a municipality of the Grisons, Switzerland.

Ferrera may also refer to:

- Val Ferrera, a valley in Graubünden, Switzerland
- Ferrera, the Romansh name of Schmitten, Grisons, Switzerland
- Ferrera di Varese, Lombardy, Italy
- Ferrera Erbognone, Province of Pavia, Lombardy, Italy
- Ferrera (surname), surname

== See also ==
- Ferrara (disambiguation)
- Ferreira (disambiguation)
