= Gustavo =

Gustavo is the Latinate form of a Germanic male given name with respective prevalence in Portuguese, Spanish, and Italian.

It is derived from Gustav /ˈɡʊstɑːv/, also spelled Gustaf, a Swedish name, likely from Slavic Gostislav.

== People with the name ==
=== Drama, film and television ===
- Gustavo Alatriste, Mexican actor, director, and producer of films, married to Silvia Pinal
- Gustavo Aguerre (born 1953), Argentine artist, curator, writer, and theatre designer
- Gustavo Monje (born 1971), Argentine stage actor and director
- Gustavo Sorola, American actor, podcast host, and co-founder of the American company, Rooster Teeth

=== Engineering, religion and science ===
- Gustavo Colonnetti (1886–1968), Italian mathematician and engineer
- Gustavo Gutiérrez Merino (1928–2024), Peruvian theologian and Dominican priest regarded as the founder of Liberation Theology at the University of Notre Dame
- Gustavo Tamayo, Colombian ophthalmologist
- Gustavo Marín, Chilean-French economist and sociologist
- Gustavo Scuseria (born 1956), Robert A. Welch Professor of Chemistry, Professor of Physics & Astronomy and Professor of Materials Science & NanoEngineering at Rice University

=== Music ===
- Gustavo Angel (born 1968), Mexican singer of Los Temerarios
- Gustavo Assis-Brasil, Brazilian jazz guitarist
- Gustavo Becerra-Schmidt (1925–2010), Chilean composer
- Gustavs Butelis (born 1978), Latvian rapper and producer known professionally as Gustavo
- Gustavo Gonzalez, also known as Big Duke, member of American hip-hop group Psycho Realm
- Gustavo Cerati (1959–2014), Argentine artist and songwriter
- Gustavo Cordera (born 1964), Argentine rock musician
- Gustavo Dudamel (born 1981), Venezuelan conductor
- Gustavo Lapis Ahumad, founding member of American goth rock band Bitter Grace
- Gustavo Ramírez Reyes, Mexican musician and composer
- Gustavo Santander, Colombian composer
- Gustavo Santaolalla (born 1952), Argentine musician, producer, and composer
- Gusttavo Lima (born 1989), Brazilian singer, song writer and record producer

=== Military and politics ===
- Gustavo A. Madero (1875–1913), participant in the Mexican Revolution
- Gustavo Adolfo Espina Salguero (born c.1946), former vice-president of Guatemala
- Gustavo Arcos Bergnes (1926–2006), Cuban revolutionary alongside Fidel Castro
- Gustavo Díaz Ordaz Bolaños Cacho (1911–1979), President of Mexico from 1964 to 1970
- Gustavo Espinoza, Peruvian politician and Congressman
- Gustavo Esteva, Mexican activist who founded the Universidad de la Tierra in Oaxaca, Mexico
- Gustavo Jiménez (c.1886–1933), Peruvian Colonel who served as President of Peru for six days
- Gustavo Leigh Guzmán (1920–1999), representative of the Air Force in the Government Junta that ruled Chile
- Gustavo Noboa Bejarano (1937–2021), Ecuadorian politician, President of Ecuador from 2000 to 2003
- Gustavo Petricioli (1928–1998), Mexican economist and ambassador to the United States
- Gustavo Petta (born 1980), Brazilian politician
- Gustavo Rojas Pinilla (1900–1975), military dictator and Colombian political figure
- Gustavo Vázquez Montes (1962–2005), Mexican politician of the PRI, governor of Colima
- Gustavo de Arístegui, Spanish politician and diplomat
- Carlos Gustavo dos Anjos, São Toméan diplomat and Foreign Minister

=== Sports ===
- Gustavo Adrián López (born 1973), Argentine footballer
- Gustavo Andrés Oberman (born 1985), Argentine footballer
- Gustavo Ayón, Mexican basketball player
- Gustavo Badell (born 1972), Venezuelan IFBB professional bodybuilder
- Gustavo Ballas (born 1958), Argentine boxer
- Gustavo Barros Schelotto, Argentine footballer
- Gustavo Benítez (born 1953), Paraguayan football defender and manager
- Gustavo Boccoli (born 1978), Brazilian footballer
- Gustavo Borges (born 1972), Brazilian swimmer
- Gustavo Cabrera (born 1979), Guatemalan footballer
- Gustavo Chacín (born 1980), Venezuelan starting pitcher in Major League Baseball
- Gustavo da Conceição (born 1957), Angolan basketball player
- Gustavo Santos Costa (born 1996), Brazilian footballer for Hồ Chí Minh City F.C.
- Gustavo Dezotti, Argentine football striker
- Gustavo Endres, Brazilian volleyball player
- Gustavo Enrique García (born 1980), Mexican footballer
- Gustavo Gómez (born 1993), Paraguayan footballer
- Gustavo Gonçalves (born 2003), Portuguese canoeist
- Gustavo Kuerten (born 1976), Brazilian tennis player
- Gustavo Marzi (1908–1966), Italian fencer
- Gustavo Manduca (born 1980), Brazilian footballer
- Gustavo Méndez (born 1971), Uruguayan footballer
- Gustavo Méndez (referee) (born 1967), Uruguayan football (soccer) referee
- Gustavo Morínigo (born 1977), Paraguayan football midfielder
- Gustavo Munúa (born 1978), Uruguayan football goalkeeper
- Gustavo Nascimento da Costa (born 1995), Brazilian footballer
- Gustavo Nery (born 1977), Brazilian footballer
- Gustavo Oliveros (born 1946), Cuban fencer
- Gustavo Lobo Paradeda (born 1979), Brazilian-born Russian futsal player
- Gustavo Poyet (born 1967), Uruguayan footballer
- Gustavo Pereira (born 1997), Brazilian footballer for Retrô
- Gustavo Quinteros Desabato (born 1965), Bolivian football player and coach
- Gustavo Salgueiro de Almeida Correia (born 1985), Brazilian footballer
- Gustavo Sant'Ana Santos (born 1995), Brazilian footballer for Sài Gòn
- Gustavo Tambunting (born 1964), Filipino politician
- Gustavo Valderrama (born 1977), Venezuelan volleyball player
- Gustavo Varela (born 1978), Uruguayan footballer
- Gustavo Varela (footballer, born 2005), Portuguese footballer
- Luis Gustavo Dias (born 1987), Brazilian footballer
- Arthur Gustavo Malzahn III (born 1965), American football coach

=== Writing ===
- Gustavo Adolfo Bécquer (1836–1870), Spanish writer of poetry and short stories
- Gustavo Adolfo Martínez Zuviría (1883–1962), novelist and scriptwriter from Argentina
- Gustavo Adolfo Mellander (born 1935), Swedish-Panamanian writer, professor, college president, and historian
- Gustavo Pérez Firmat (born 1949), Cuban-American writer, poet, professor
- Gustavo Gorriti, Peruvian journalist
- Gustavo Sainz (1940–2015), Spanish language author from Mexico

=== Other professions ===
- Gustavo C. Garcia (1915–1964), American civil rights attorney and advocate
- Gustavo Charif (born 1966), Argentine artist
- Gustavo Cisneros (born 1946), Venezuelan-born media mogul
- Gustavo Ferraro, Argentine banker
- Gustavo Franco, Brazilian economist, president of the Brazilian Central Bank 1994–1995 and 1997–1999
- Gustavo Gayer (born 1981), Brazilian businessman and politician
- Gustavo Gianetti (born 1979), Brazilian model, Mister World 2003
- Gustavo Lorgia (1951–2024), Colombian illusionist
- Gustavo Martínez Zuviría, de facto Federal Interventor of Córdoba, Argentina
- Gustavo Rol (1903–1994), Italian sensitive
- Gustavo R. Vincenti (1888–1974), Maltese architect and developer

== Fictional characters ==
- Gustavo, in the video game Uncharted 4: A Thief's End
- Gustavo, in the children's animated series Thomas & Friends
- Gustavo Fring, in the American television drama series Breaking Bad on AMC
- Gustavo Rocque, on the show Big Time Rush
- Gustavo, a playable character in Pizza Tower
- Gustavo Ramirez from the 2024 Disney series Primos

== See also ==
- Gustavo A. Madero, Mexico City, a municipality
- Licenciado Gustavo Díaz Ordaz International Airport, at Puerto Vallarta, Jalisco
- Gustavo Rojas Pinilla International Airport, on San Andres Island, Colombia
