= Ferrara (disambiguation) =

Ferrara is a city in Italy.

Ferrara may also refer to:

- Ferrara (surname)
- Province of Ferrara, a province in Italy
- Duchy of Ferrara, a historical state in Italy
- 23rd Infantry Division Ferrara, an Italian infantry division of World War II
- Ferrara Fire Apparatus, an American manufacturer of emergency services equipment
- Ferrara Bakery and Cafe, a New York City restaurant
- Ferrara Candy Company, a Chicago-based candy company

== See also ==
- Ferrari (disambiguation)
- Ferraro, a surname
- Ferreira (disambiguation)
