= Ferraris (surname) =

Ferraris is an Italian surname. Notable people with the surname include:

- Adalgiso Ferraris (1890–1968), Italian-born British musician and composer
- Amalia Ferraris (c. 1830–1904), Italian ballerina
- Antonio de Ferraris (c. 1444–1517), Greek-Italian scholar and doctor
- Attilio Ferraris (1904–1947), Italian footballer
- Claudia Ferraris (born 1988), Italian beauty pageant winner
- David Ferraris (born 1963), South African racehorse trainer, now in Hong Kong
- Galileo Ferraris (1847–1897), Italian physicist and electrical engineer
- Ines Maria Ferraris (1882–1971), Italian operatic soprano
- Jan Ferraris (born 1947), American professional golfer
- Joseph de Ferraris (1726–1814), Austrian general and cartographer
- Lucius Ferraris (18th century), Italian Franciscan canonist
- Maurizio Ferraris (born 1956), Italian philosopher and academic
- Pietro Ferraris (1912–1991), Italian footballer
- Zoë Ferraris, American novelist

== See also ==
- Ferrara (surname)
- Ferrari (surname)
- Ferraro
- Ferrera (surname)
- Ferrero (surname)
