= Ferrero =

Ferrero may refer to:

- Ferrero (surname), a surname
- Ferrero (company), an Italian manufacturer of chocolate and confectionaries
- Ferrero Bay, a body of water between King Peninsula and Canisteo Peninsula, Antarctica
- Ferrero–Washington theorem, a result in algebraic number theory

== See also ==
- Ferrari (disambiguation)
- Ferreri (disambiguation)
