= Ferrari (surname) =

Ferrari is an Italian occupational surname, the plural form of Ferraro, meaning blacksmith.

== People with the surname ==
- Alex Ferrari (footballer) (born 1994), Italian footballer
- Alex Ferrari (singer) (born 1982), Brazilian singer
- Alfredo Baldomir Ferrari (1884–1948), Uruguayan politician
- Alfredo Ferrari (1932–1956), known as Dino, automotive engineer and son of Enzo Ferrari
- Amato Ferrari (born 1966), founder of Italian racing team AF Corse
- Andrea Carlo Ferrari (1850–1921), Italian Catholic Cardinal
- Belinda Ferrari, Australian microbiologist
- Benedetto Ferrari (c. 1603–1681), Italian composer
- Carlos Ferrari (playwright) (1931–2025), Argentine-Puerto Rican playwright, actor and theatrical director
- Davide Ferrari (born 1992) Italian footballer
- Defendente Ferrari (c. 1480 – c. 1540), Italian painter
- Dino Ferrari (1914–2000), Italian painter
- Domenico Ferrari (1722–1780), Italian violinist and composer
- Egidio Ferrari (born 1981), Brazilian politician
- Enzo Ferrari (1898–1988), founder of Italian automaker Ferrari S.p.A.
- Enzo Ferrari (Italian footballer) (1942–2025), Italian football player and manager
- Enzo Ferrari (Chilean footballer) (born 1979), Chilean football player and manager
- Ermanno Wolf-Ferrari (1876–1948), Italian-German composer
- Ettore Ferrari (1848–1929), Italian sculptor
- Fausto Ferrari (born 1980), Italian footballer
- Franck Ferrari (1963–2015), French baritone
- Franco Ferrari (disambiguation), several people
- Gachi Ferrari (born 1954), Argentine former model, actress and TV hostess
- Gian Marco Ferrari (born 1992), Italian footballer
- Gianluca Ferrari (born 1997), Argentine professional footballer
- Gianmarco Ferrari (born 2000), Italian tennis player
- Giovanni Ferrari (1907–1982), Italian footballer and coach
- Giovanni Baptista Ferrari (1584–1655), Italian Jesuit and botanist
- Giusy Ferreri (born 1979), Italian singer
- Isabella Ferrari (born 1964), Italian actress
- Jean Ferrari (born 1975), Peruvian professional footballer and manager
- Jérémy Ferrari (born 1985), French comedian
- Johann Angelo Ferrari (1806–1876), Italian-Austrian entomologist
- Jonathan Ferrari (born 1985), Argentine professional footballer
- Larry Ferrari (1932–1997), American organist
- Laurence Ferrari (born 1966), French journalist
- León Ferrari (1920–2013), Argentine contemporary conceptual artist
- Lodovico Ferrari (1522–1565), Italian mathematician
- Lolo Ferrari, (1963–2000), French dancer, pornographic actress, actress and singer
- Luc Ferrari (1929–2005), French-born Italian composer
- Lucas Ferrari (born 1997), Argentine professional footballer
- Marina Ferrari (born 1973), French politician
- Matteo Ferrari (born 1979), Italian footballer
- Max Ferrari (politician) (born 1971), Italian politician and journalist
- Max Ferrari (soccer) (born 2000), Canadian soccer player
- Michel Ferrari (born 1954), Swiss neurologist
- Michele Ferrari (born 1953), Italian physician, cycling coach and author
- Michelle Ferrari (born 1983), Italian pornographic actress and television personality
- Nick Ferrari (born 1959), British broadcaster
- Pablo Ferrari (born 1949), Argentine mathematician
- Paola Ferrari (basketball) (born 1985), Paraguayan basketball player
- Paola Ferrari (journalist) (born 1960), Italian journalist
- Paul Ferreri (1948–2017), Italian/Australian boxer
- Paulo Ferrari (born 1982), Argentine footballer
- Philipp von Ferrary (1850–1917), sometimes spelt Ferrari, philatelist who assembled one of the most complete stamp collections ever
- Pietro Mansueto Ferrari (1823–1893), Italian entomologist
- Roberto Ferrari (disambiguation), several people
  - Roberto Ferrari (gymnast) (1890–1954), Italian gymnast
  - Roberto Ferrari (athlete) (born 1967), Italian high jumper
  - Roberto Ferrari (fencer) (1923–1996), Italian Olympic fencer
  - Roberto Ferrari (cyclist) (born 1983), Italian cyclist
- Vanessa Ferrari (born 1990), Italian gymnast
- Violetta Ferrari (1930–2014), Hungarian actress
- Werner Ferrari (1946–2025), Swiss serial killer, murderer of children

== See also ==
- Ferrari (disambiguation)
- People named Ferrary
- Ferraris (surname)
- Ferrara (surname)
- Ferrero (surname)
