= Fabbri (surname) =

Fabbri is an Italian surname. Notable people with the name include:

- Adriana Bisi Fabbri (1881–1918), Italian painter
- Agenore Fabbri (1911–1998), Italian sculptor and painter
- Alan Fabbri (born 1979), Italian politician
- Alejandro Fabbri (born 1982), Argentine tennis player
- Alessandro Fabbri (naval officer) (1877–1922), commander of the Otter Cliffs Radio Station
- Alessandro Fabbri (footballer) (born 1990), Italian footballer
- Alessandro Fabbri (screenwriter) (born 1978), Italian screenwriter
- Alex Fabbri (born 1998), Sammarinese motorcycle racer
- Alicia Fabbri (born 2003), Canadian ice dancer
- Andrea Fabbri (born 1992), Italian ice dancer
- Camila Fabbri (born 1989), Argentine writer, playwright and actress
- Cora Fabbri (1871–1892), American poet
- Daniele Fabbri or Daniele Luttazzi (born 1961), Italian comedian, writer, satirist, illustrator and singer/songwriter
- Davidé Fabbri, Italian comic book artist
- Diego Fabbri (1911–1980), Italian playwright
- Edda Fabbri (born 1949), Uruguayan writer
- Edmondo Fabbri (1921–1995), Italian football player and coach
- Fabio Fabbri (born 1933), Italian minister of defence, 1993–94
- Fabrizio Fabbri (1948–2019), Italian cyclist
- Filippo Fabbri (born 2002), Sammarinese footballer
- Flora Fabbri, 19th century ballet dancer
- Franco Fabbri (born 1949), Brazilian-born Italian musician, musicologist and broadcaster
- Gianmarco Fabbri (born 1997), Italian football player
- Giovan Battista Fabbri (1926–2015), Italian football player and manager
- Inez Fabbri (1831–1909), Austro-American opera singer and impresaria
- Jacques Fabbri (1925–1997), French actor
- Lea Fabbri (born 1985), Croatian basketball player
- Leonardo Fabbri (born 1997), Italian shot putter
- Luce Fabbri (1908–2000), Italian anarchist writer and publisher, daughter of Luigi
- Lucio Fabbri (born 1955), Italian musician, conductor and composer
- Luigi Fabbri (1877–1935), Italian anarchist, writer, agitator and propagandist
- Marcello Fabbri (1923–2015), Italian poet
- Marco Fabbri (born 1988), Italian ice dancer
- Michael Fabbri, English stand-up comedian
- Nello Fabbri (1934–2020), Italian cyclist
- Nelson Delle-Vigne Fabbri (born 1949), Italian classical pianist and educator
- Néstor Fabbri (born 1968), Argentine footballer
- Paolo Fabbri (born 1948), Italian musicologist
- Paolo Fabbri (1939–2020), Italian semiotician and professor
- Pasquale Fabbri (born 1942), Italian cyclist
- Robby Fabbri (born 1996), Canadian ice hockey player
- Roberto Fabbri (born 1964), Italian guitarist
- Thomas Fabbri (born 1991), Italian footballer
- Tricia Fabbri, American basketball coach
- Ulderico Fabbri (1897–1970), Italian sculptor
- Luigi Fabbri (born 1935), Italian sculptor and Uruguayan cyclist

== Fictitious ==
- Lorenzo Fabbri, fictional character from police drama television series Inspector Rex
