= Stefano Arteaga =

Spanish writer (1747–1799)

Reverend Stefano Arteaga S.J.
- Born: December 26, 1747; Moraleja de Coca, Spain
- Died: 30 September 1799 (aged 51); Paris, France
- Occupations: Jesuit priest, classical scholar, music theorist
- Known for: First critical history of opera

Academic background
- Education: University of Bologna
- Influences: Giovanni Battista Martini

Stefano Arteaga SJ (born Esteban de Arteaga y López; December 26, 1747 – September 30, 1799) was a Spanish-born writer on theater and music, active in Italy.

== Biography ==
Esteban Arteaga was born in Moraleja de Coca on 26 December 1747. After entering the Society of Jesus (1763) he studied in Madrid, Corsica and Italy. In 1767 the expulsion of the Jesuits from Spain forced him into exile. He moved to Bologna, where he attended the University (1773–8). There at Padre Martini’s behest, he wrote the first critical history of opera, Le rivoluzioni del teatro musicale italiano dalla sua origine fino al presente (Bologna, 1783–8), which met with immediate success and was translated into German (1789) and French (1802). A second edition, in three volumes, appeared at Venice in 1785. Arteaga was made a member of the Accademia Galileiana of Padua and the Accademia Virgiliana of Mantua. He moved to Venice and to Rome, where he prepared works on ideal beauty (1789) and ancient and modern rhythm. His last years were spent in travel. He died in Paris on 30 September 1799.

The original edition of Le rivoluzioni began with chapters on opera aesthetics and on the suitability of Italian as a language for music. His history did not get beyond the advent of Metastasio: he viewed the early 18th century as the Golden Age of Music, singling out the composers Vinci and Jommelli as exemplary and crediting Metastasio with having raised opera to the greatest perfection possible. The second, ‘enlarged, varied and corrected’ edition of 1785 acquired a detailed critique of the decadence into which opera had fallen since that time. Much of his criticism centres on the failure of composers to set the words in a natural way that conveyed the meaning and moved the listener. He deplored accompaniments that obscured the words, distorted the meaning, and were too noisy and heavily orchestrated, especially with winds. On the other hand, he praised Gluck for his sensitive text settings and the unity he achieved by means of continuous string accompaniments for recitative, credited Piccinni with having substituted the rondò for the distortions of da capo form, and cited other composers (Traetta, Paisiello, Sacchini and Sarti) and performers (Ferrari, Jarnović, Lolli, Somis and Chiabrano, among others) whose work he believed had merit. Calzabigi countered with a sarcastic Risposta (Venice, 1790).

== Works ==
- Le rivoluzioni del teatro musicale italiano dalla sua origine fino al presente (Bologna, 1783–8; Ger. trans., 1789; Fr. trans., 1802).
- Investigaciones filosoficas sobre la belleza ideal, considerada como objeto de todas las artes de imitacion (Madrid, 1789), ed. A. Izquierdo (Madrid, 1993)
- Della influenza degli arabi sull’origine della poesia moderna in Europa (Rome, 1791)
- Del ritmo sonoro e del ritmo muto nella musica degli antichi (MS, c 1796, E-Mah ) [ed. in Batllori]
- Lettere musico-filologiche (MS, c 1796, Mah) [ed. in Batllori]

== Bibliography ==
- M. Batllori: Introduction to Esteban de Arteaga: Lettere musico-filologiche: II. Del ritmo sonoro (Madrid, 1944).
- Allorto, R. (1950). "Stefano Arteaga e Le rivoluzioni del teatro musicale italiano". Rivista Musicale Italiana. 52: 124–7.
- Borsellino, Nino (1962). "Arteaga, Stefano". Dizionario Biografico degli Italiani (in Italian). Vol. 4: Arconati–Bacaredda. Rome: Istituto dell'Enciclopedia Italiana. OCLC 883370.
