= Gustavo Henrique =

Gustavo Henrique may refer to:

== Footballers ==
- Gustavo (footballer, born 1994), full name Gustavo Henrique da Silva Sousa, Brazilian forward
- Gustavo (footballer, born 1997), full name Gustavo Henrique Correia Pereira, Brazilian defender
- Gustavo (footballer, born 1999), full name Gustavo Henrique Cabral de Souza, Brazilian forward
- Gustavo Henrique (footballer, born 1993), full name Gustavo Henrique Vernes, Brazilian defender
- Gustavo Henrique (footballer, born 1995), full name Gustavo Henrique Rodrigues, Brazilian forward
- Gustavo Henrique (footballer, born May 1999), full name Gustavo Henrique Alves Rodrigues, Brazilian forward
- Gustavo Henrique (footballer, born October 1999), full name Gustavo Henrique Santos, Brazilian defender
- Gustavo Henrique Ferrareis (born 1996), Brazilian midfielder
- Gustavo Tocantins (born 1996), full name Gustavo Henrique Barbosa Freire, Brazilian forward
- Gustavo Nescau (born 2000), full name Gustavo Henrique Alves Silva, Brazilian forward

== Other ==
- Gustavo Henrique Araújo (born 1992), Brazilian Paralympic track and field athletic
- Gustavo Henrique Silva (born 1979), Brazilian handballer
