= Renan Ferreira =

Renan Ferreira may refer to:

- Renan Ferreira (fighter) (born 1989), Brazilian mixed martial artist
- Renan Ferreira (footballer) (born 1995), Brazilian footballer

== See also ==
- Ferreira (surname)
