= Roberto Ferrari =

Roberto Ferrari may refer to:

- Roberto Ferrari (athlete) (born 1967), retired Italian high jumper
- Roberto Ferrari (cardiologist) (born 1950), Italian cardiologist
- Roberto Ferrari (cyclist) (born 1983), Italian cyclist
- Roberto Ferrari (fencer) (1923–1996), Italian Olympic fencer
- Roberto Ferrari (gymnast) (1890–1954), Italian gymnast
