= Ferraro =

Ferraro is an occupational surname of Italian origin meaning blacksmith in Italian (from "ferro", the Italian word for iron). Notable people with this surname include:

- Carlos Ferraro (1953–2025), Argentine politician
- Carmelo Ferraro (born 1932), Italian Roman Catholic archbishop
- Chris Ferraro (born 1973), NHL hockey player, brother of Peter Ferraro
- Emanuele Ferraro (born 1978), Italian footballer
- F. Richard Ferraro, Dutch-born American psychologist
- Geraldine Ferraro (1935–2011), U.S. politician and 1984 vice presidential candidate
- Guillermo Ferraro (1955–2024), Argentine accountant, businessperson, and politician
- Gustavo Ferraro, Argentine banker
- Hernán Ferraro (born 1968), Argentine volleyball coach
- James Ferraro (born 1986), American experimental musician
- John Ferraro (1924–2001), Los Angeles city council man
- Joshua Ferraro, American entrepreneur and computer scientist
- Juan José Ferraro (1923–1973), Argentine footballer
- Landon Ferraro (born 1991), ice hockey player
- Margaret Hart Ferraro also known as Margie Hart (1913–2000), striptease dancer and wife of John Ferraro
- Mario Ferraro (born 1998), Canadian ice hockey player
- Maximiliano Ferraro (born 1975), Argentine politician
- Mike Ferraro (born 1944), former major league baseball player
- Nathan Ferraro, Canadian musician with rock band The Midway State
- Nicholas Ferraro (1928–1984), New York politician and judge
- Peter Ferraro (born 1973), NHL hockey player, brother of Chris Ferraro
- Pier Miranda Ferraro (1924–2008), Italian operatic tenor
- Ray Ferraro (born 1964), hockey player
- Rick Ferraro (born 1950), Canadian politician in Ontario
- Salvatore Ferraro (born 1983), Italian football player
- Vince Ferraro, Fortune 100 business and marketing executive

== See also ==
- Ferrara (surname)
- Ferrera (surname)
- Ferrero (surname)
- Ferrari (surname), the plural form
