= Franco Ferrari =

Franco Ferrari may refer to:

- Franco Ferrari (footballer, born 1987), Peruvian midfielder
- Franco Ferrari (footballer, born 1992), Argentine defender
- Franco Ferrari (footballer, born 1995), Argentine forward

== See also ==
- Ferrari (surname)
- Franco (name) § Given name
