= University of Ferrara =

University in Ferrara, Italy

- Università degli Studi di Ferrara
- Seal of the university
- Motto: Ex labore fructus (Latin)
- Motto in English: The Fruits of Labor
- Type: State-supported
- Established: 1391; 635 years ago
- Rector: Laura Ramaciotti
- Administrative staff: 600
- Students: 25,245 (2021)
- Location: Ferrara, Italy; 44.83335°N 11.62649°E
- Campus: Both Urban/University town and Suburban
- Sports teams: CUS Ferrara
- Website: www.unife.it

The University of Ferrara (Italian: Università degli Studi di Ferrara) is the main university of the city of Ferrara in the Emilia-Romagna region of northern Italy. In the years prior to the First World War the University of Ferrara, with more than 500 students, was the best attended of the free universities in Italy. Today there are approximately 16,000 students enrolled at the University of Ferrara with nearly 400 degrees granted each year. The teaching staff number 600, including 288 researchers. It is organized into 12 Departments.

== History ==
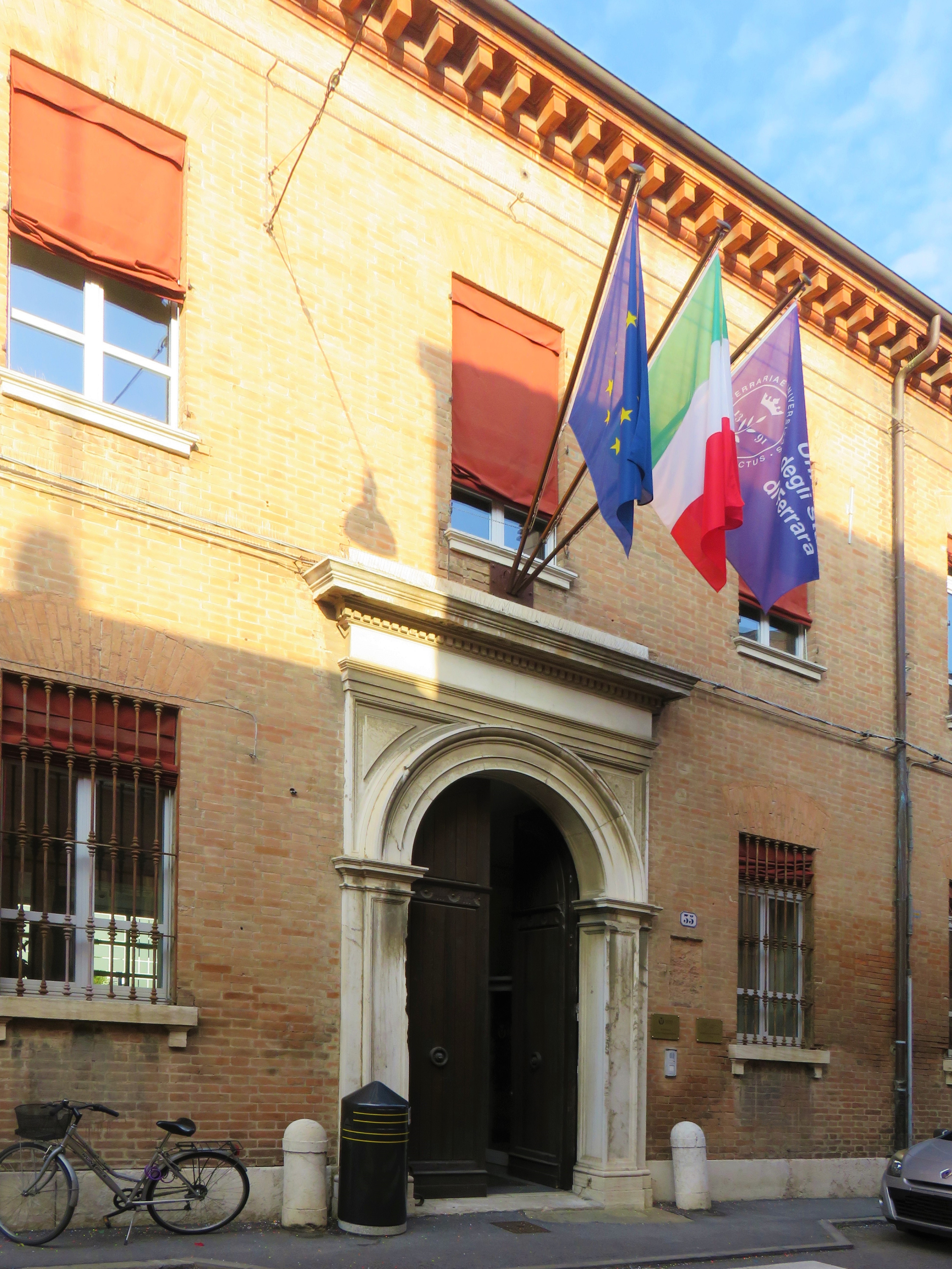
University of Ferrara

The University of Ferrara was founded on March 4, 1391 by Marquis Alberto V D'Este with the permission of Pope Boniface IX. The Studium Generale was inaugurated on St. Luke's Day (October 18) of that year with courses in law, arts and theology.

After the unification of Italy, Ferrara University became a free university with faculties of Law and Mathematics, a three-year course in Medicine (reduced to two years in 1863-64), as well as Schools of Veterinary Medicine (abolished in 1876), Pharmacy, and for public Notaries.

University rankings

Global – Overall
- QS World: 951-1000 (2026)

After World War II, it started to be state-supported and this allowed the opening of many faculties and research departments. The most remarkable growth took place between the '70s and the '80s, when Prof. Antonio Rossi was in charge of it as Rector.

Some notable instructors include:

- Giovanni Bianchini, professor of astronomy
- Cesare Cremonini, professor of natural philosophy between 1573 and 1590

== Research ==
The CIVR (Comitato di Indirizzo per la Valutazione della Ricerca, or Directory Committee for the Evaluation of Research), according to a public report of 2007, has rated the University of Ferrara as the best Italian university for the applied exploitation of research. In order to produce these results, the CIVR has taken into consideration numerous data such as patents registered in Italy and abroad, the research collaborations between the university business and academic spin-offs.

Starting in 2000, the University of Ferrara has collaborated across the faculties of economics, architecture, medicine, jurisprudence and engineering in the main industrial areas of China, that is, Guangdong, in research and experimentation with the Chinese universities and important local businesses. Collaborations have begun between the Faculty of Economics of Ferrara and the South China University of Technology, an agreement that has permitted the faculty in Ferrara to undertake a research project about the industry of Guangdong and has allowed the Faculty of Medicine to open in 2006 a permanent office near the Capital University of Medical Sciences of Beijing. This has allowed the implementation of a master's degree of the second level in clinical Neurophysiology, with consent to the young Chinese neurologists, to expand the applied techniques and their studies of neuroscience. Institutions participating in the master's program include the department of neurophysiology of the University of Ferrara, the Neurological institute of Milan and to Beijing.

Another active master's program with its seat in Ferrara is that of the aesthetics and cosmetology signed to Canton through the Ferrara Center of Cosmetology and the Chinese academy Ginzza International Beauty and Hair Academy.

== Organization ==
These are the 8 faculties which the university is divided into:

- Faculty of Architecture
- Faculty of Economics
- Faculty of Engineering
- Faculty of Humanities
- Faculty of Law
- Faculty of Mathematical, Physical and Natural Sciences
- Faculty of Medicine and Surgery
- Faculty of Pharmacy

As of 2014, there are 12 PhD courses, organized around a special Institute for Advanced Studies, IUSS-Ferrara 1391.

Generally speaking, research departments do not coincide with faculties (as is usual in Italy). Specifically, literature, history, philosophy are independent of one another. Furthermore, biologists, physicists, and geologists work in different institutions. Medical research is carried out in cooperation with the city hospital, which offers some of its buildings for use as a teaching hospital.

== Notable alumni and faculty ==
- Ludovico Ariosto
- Patrizio Bianchi
- Nicolaus Copernicus Doctor of Canon Law (Nicolaus Copernich de Prusia, Jure Canonico ... et doctoratus)
- Gabriele Falloppio
- Michele Ferrari
- Roberto Ferrari
- Theodorus Gaza
- Marcella Hazan
- William Latimer
- Paracelsus
- Massimo Pigliucci
- Girolamo Savonarola

== Points of interest ==
- Biblioteca Comunale Ariostea
- Orto Botanico dell'Università di Ferrara

== See also ==
- ESDP-Network
- List of Italian universities
- List of medieval universities

== Sources ==
- Saletti, Beatrice (2020). "Loyalty to the church, loyalty to the duke: conflicts of power in late medieval Ferrara". In Fuller, Amy; McCallum, John; Hodgson, Natasha; Morton, Nicholas (eds.). Religion and Conflict in Medieval and Early Modern Worlds: Identities, Communities and Authorities. Taylor & Francis. pp. 223–238. ISBN 9780429836008.
