= Ferreri =

Ferreri is an Italian occupational surname, the plural form of Ferraro, meaning blacksmith.

- Emilio Ferreri (1894 – 1981), Italian admiral during World War II
- Giusy Ferreri (born 1979), Italian singer-songwriter
- Jean-Marc Ferreri (born 1962), French footballer of Italian origin
- Juan Ferreri (born 1970), Uruguayan footballer
- Marco Ferreri (1928–1997), Italian film director, screenwriter and actor
- Walter Ferreri, Italian astronomer

== See also ==
- Ferrari
- Ferrero
- 3308 Ferreri, main-belt asteroid
