= Ferrari (disambiguation) =

Ferrari is an Italian sports car manufacturer.

Ferrari may also refer to:

== People ==
- Ferrari (surname)
  - Enzo Ferrari (1898–1988), founder of Italian automaker Ferrari S.p.A.
  - Ettore Ferrari (1845–1929), Italian sculptor, politician and Grand Master of the Grande Oriente d'Italia
  - Piero Ferrari (born 1945), vice chairman of Italian automaker Ferrari S.p.A.
  - Philipp von Ferrary (1850–1917), sometimes spelt Ferrari, philatelist who assembled one of the most complete stamp collections ever
- Ferraris (surname)
- Muhammad Ferarri (born 2003), Indonesian footballer
- Ferrari Fairtex, (born 1997), Muay Thai fighter

== Arts, entertainment and media ==
- Ferrari (2003 film), an Italian biopic about Enzo Ferrari starring Sergio Castellitto
- Ferrari (2023 film), an American biographical drama film about Enzo Ferrari starring Adam Driver
  - Ferrari (2023 soundtrack), the soundtrack of the film
- "Ferrari" (James Hype and Miggy Dela Rosa song), 2022
- "Ferrari" (Los Gemelos de Sinaloa, Clave Especial and Fuerza Regida song), 2026
- "Ferrari", a song by Yemi Alade from the album Mama Africa
- "Ferrari", a song by jayvive ramma
- "Ferrari", a song by Bebe Rexha from the album Expectations
- "Ferrari", a 2019 song by Cheat Codes
- "Ferrari", a song by German-Kurdish rapper Eno featuring German-Turkish rapper Mero from Eno's 2019 album Fuchs
- Ferrari Grand Prix Challenge, also known as F-1 Hero MD, a 1992 Formula One racing video game for multiple console systems

== Museums ==
- Museo Casa Enzo Ferrari (Italian: Casa Enzo Ferrari Museum), Modena, Italy
- Museo Ferrari, museum of the automobile manufacturer

== Other uses ==
- Autodromo Enzo e Dino Ferrari, auto racing circuit
- Ferrari Trento, Italian sparkling wine producers
- Ferrari World, amusement park
- LaFerrari, a Ferrari supercar
- Scuderia Ferrari, racing division of Ferrari S.p.A.

== See also ==
- Ferreira (disambiguation)
- Ferretti (disambiguation)
