= Latinitas Sinica =

Center at Beijing Foreign Studies University in China

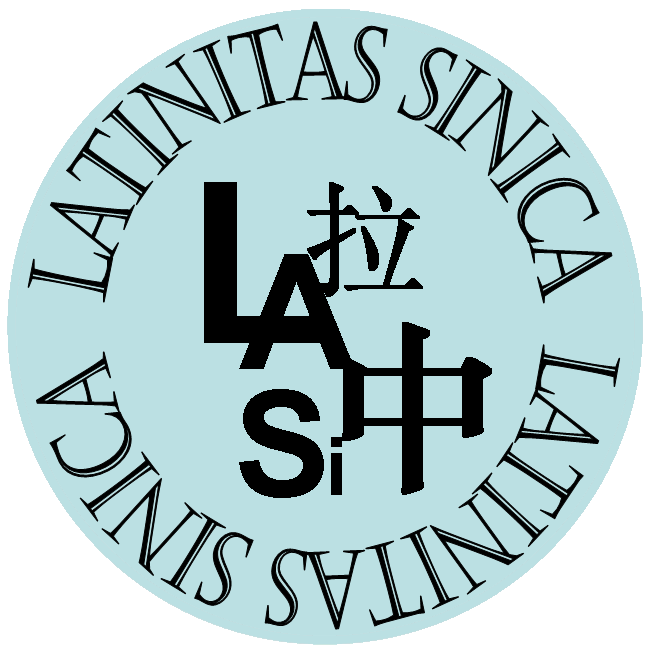
The official logo of Latinitas Sinica, Centre for Latin Language and Culture of Beijing Foreign Studies University

Latinitas Sinica (Latin for Chinese Latinity) began its existence in Beijing Foreign Studies University. It is a specialized institution dedicated to the study and promotion of Latin in China by supporting the learning and teaching of Latin Language in China; Promoting research in China in the field of Latin Language and Culture; Researching the area of Latin Sinology; Researching the area of Early Latin to Chinese Translations; Offering to Chinese society various services related to Latin Language and Culture, being a reference for institutions around the world interested in Latin Language in China. Every year issues an online periodical about Latin Studies in China. It was established in 2012. The current director is Michele Ferrero. Latinitas Sinica organizes every year a Latin Summer Course. Latinitas Sinica has established connections with various other centers for the studies of Classics around the world, in particular with the Pontificium Institutum Altioris Latinitatis in Rome and the European Centre for Humanistic Studies "Erasmus". Latinitas Sinica every year holds a performance of Latin songs, such as "Gaudeamus", "Panis angelicus" and the Latin version of the Anthem of Europe. During the Summer 2014 Latinitas Sinica and the Pontificium Institutum Altioris Latinitatis in Rome organized the first "Summer Latin Intensive Course for Chinese Students". One of the advisers of Latinitas Sinica is Latinist Leopold Leeb.
