= Lower East Side History Project =

New York City history organization

- Formation: 2003
- Headquarters: New York, NY
- Website: www.leshp.org

The Lower East Side History Project (LESHP) is a non-profit organization dedicated to researching, documenting and preserving the history of the greater Lower East Side of New York City.

== History ==
Founded in 2003 by Eric Ferrara, LESHP provides educational programming to K-12 and university level students, public & private walking tours, media consultation, research services, special events, lectures, and presentations.

Research concentrates on the several distinct neighborhoods that make up the traditional Lower East Side, including: East Village, Alphabet City, the Bowery, Chinatown, Two Bridges, Nolita and Little Italy.

In June 2009 LESHP received a prestigious award and grant from the Citizen's Committee for New York City, an organization founded in the 1970s by Jacob Javitz. In June 2012, LESHP was honored with a Greenwich Village Society for Historic Preservation award.
