= Daniela Ferrero =

Mathematician

Daniela Ferrero is a mathematician specializing in graph theory, including the degree diameter problem and propagation processes on graphs. Originally from Uruguay, and educated in Uruguay and Spain, she has lived in Taiwan, France, and the US, where she works as a professor of mathematics at Texas State University.

== Research ==
Ferrero's early research concerned asymptotic constructions for the degree diameter problem, the problem of constructing graphs in which all vertices have both low degree and low distance to all other vertices. Her research in this period also concerned fault tolerance in network design.

More recently, her interests have shifted to power domination and zero forcing, topics related to propagation processes in networks. Here, a zero forcing set is a subset of the vertices in a network, with the property that if the set is repeatedly expanded by adding vertices that are the only outside neighbors of vertices already in the set, then the growing set eventually covers all vertices. A goal of research in this area is to find small zero forcing sets; this is closely related to low-rank approximation and to applications in recommender systems. A power dominating set is a variation of a dominating set, defined as a set of vertices whose closed neighborhood forms a zero forcing set.

== Education and career ==
Ferrero grew up in Uruguay, and earned a bachelor's degree in the faculty of engineering at the University of the Republic. Lacking alternatives for continued study in Uruguay, she traveled to the Polytechnic University of Catalonia in Spain for doctoral study in mathematics, completing her Ph.D. in 1999. Her dissertation, Graphs and Hypergraphs as Interconnection Network Models, was supervised by Carles Padró Laimón.

She was a postdoctoral researcher at the Institute of Information Science of Academia Sinica in Taiwan, before joining Texas State University as an assistant professor in 2000. She was promoted to associate professor in 2006 and full professor in 2020.

== Recognition ==
Ferrero was named as a Fellow of the Association for Women in Mathematics, in the 2022 class of fellows, "for sustained and impactful mentoring of young women and underrepresented minorities in mathematics; for leadership in creating research opportunities for women in graph theory through the Women in Graph Theory and Applications Research Network; and for promoting the inclusion and visibility of women through organizing conferences and other professional service".
