= José Ornella Ferreira =

Venezuelan military officer

José Adelino Ornelas Ferreira, alternatively known as José Adelino Ornella Ferreira, is a Venezuelan military officer and head of the operational command of the National Bolivarian Armed Forces of Venezuela. A longtime supporter of Venezuelan President Nicolás Maduro, Ornella was targeted with sanctions by the Canadian government in April 2019.

During the 2019 Venezuela uprising, Ornella's Twitter account denied his involvement with forces loyal to Juan Guaidó and reaffirmed his support for the Maduro presidency.
