= Roberto Ferrari (cardiologist) =

Italian Cardiologist

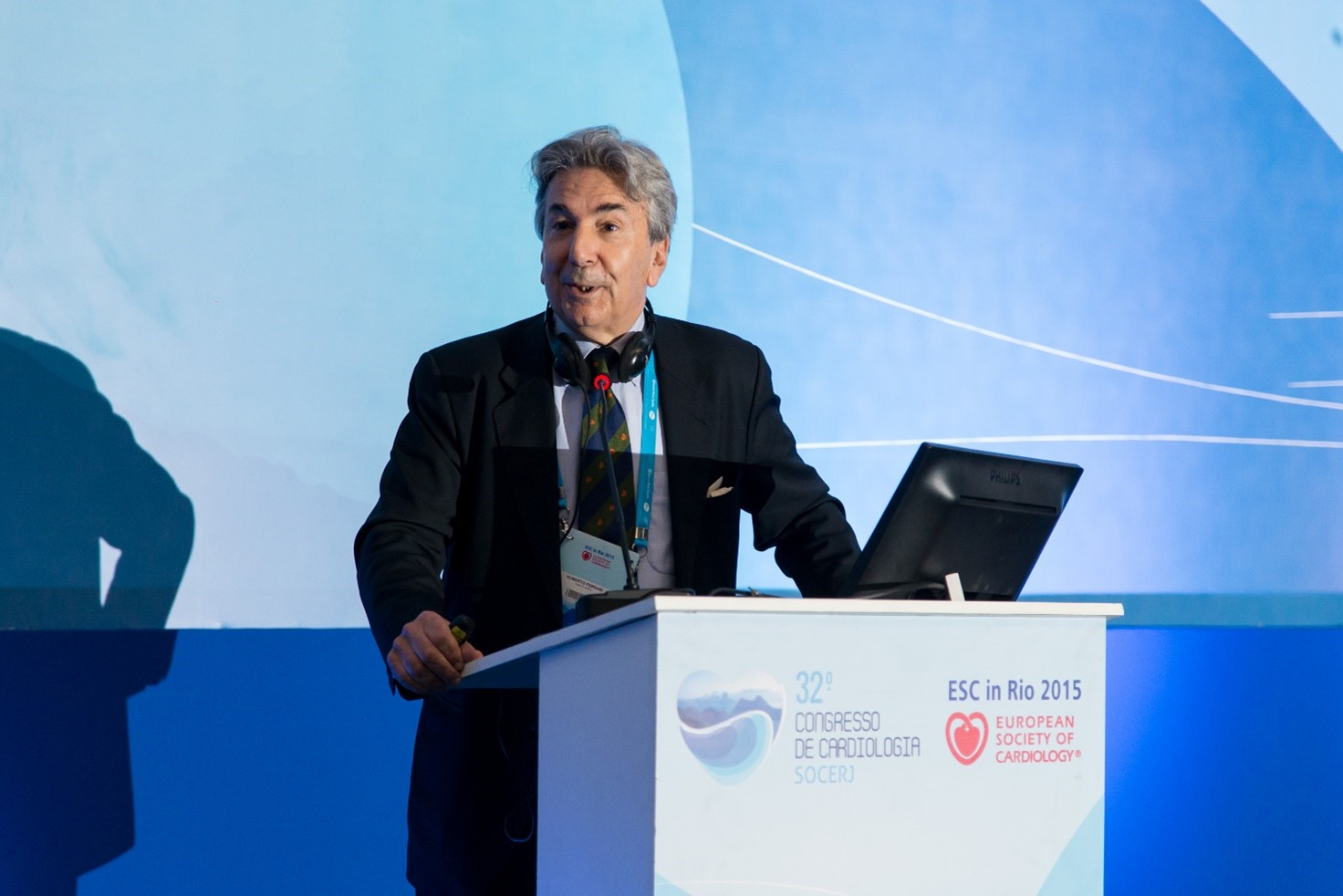
- Born: 10 June 1950 (age 76)
- Occupation: Cardiologist

Roberto Ferrari (born 10 June 1950) is an Italian cardiologist who holds the position of Emeritus Professor at the University of Ferrara, where he was the chair of Cardiology in the School of Medicine until the 2019–2020 academic year.

Ferrari has served as the Director of the Cardiovascular Centre of the University of Ferrara, the Director of Cardiology at the St. Anna University Hospital of Ferrara, and the Director of the Centre of Cardiovascular Research "S. Maugeri". Ferrari is past president of the European Society of Cardiology (ESC).

== Life ==
Ferrari was born in La Spezia, Italy. He is the only son of a textile merchant. He was encouraged by his cousin, a biochemist, Anna Maria Sechi, to study medicine.

== Education ==
Ferrari graduated with distinction from the Bologna School of Medicine in 1974. Upon graduation, Professor Ferrari went on to complete specialized postgraduate studies at both the School of Cardiology through the University of Parma (1974-1976), and the School of Radiology through the University of Bologna (1977-1980). Driven by a keen interest in research, Professor Ferrari proceeded to complete his PhD degree in the field of cardiac metabolism at the Cardiothoracic Institute of the National Heart Hospital through the University of London (1980-1982). He served as an Honorary Assistant Research Fellow at the National Heart Hospital in London from 1978 to 1989, and as a Senior Research Fellow at the Rayne Institute of St. Thomas' Hospital in London (1989-1996).

== Career ==
Ferrari has contributed scientific findings targeted at characterizing the molecular mechanisms of the ischemic and failing myocardium, dedicating himself to improving the clinical treatment of myocardial ischemia and heart failure, while placing a particular emphasis on interdisciplinary and collaborative studies throughout his career.

Ferrari holds the position of Emeritus Professor at the University of Ferrara. His academic career path development follows his initial appointment to the position of associate professor in Cardiology at the University of Brescia in 1987 and then at the University of Ferrara in 1998. In 2000, Professor Ferrari was appointed to the position of Full Professor in Cardiology as well as the Director of the Cardiovascular Centre of the University of Ferrara and Director of Cardiology at the St. Anna University Hospital of Ferrara. In addition to his current position as Emeritus Professor, Ferrari is presently the Scientific Director of Medical Trial Analysis, an academic Clinical Research Organization (CRO). He founded the European Heart for Children (EHC), established during his presidency of the European Society of Cardiology (ESC). As a non-profit organization, the EHC aims to cure children born with congenital heart diseases in underdeveloped countries. Since its formation, the EHC has effectively conducted nearly 30 missions, examined, diagnosed, and treated over 2200 children, with 349 being successfully operated on, and trained numerous cardiologists and cardiac surgeons around the world. Moreover, the EHC has built a pediatric cardiovascular surgeon training centre in Nigeria and successfully constructed a Pediatric Unit in Syria, with the third facility in Morocco currently in progress.

Ferrari has held positions held in several cardiological organizations: Founder and President of the European Heart for Children (EHC) from 2010 to 2018; Member of the European Society of Cardiology (ESC) Committee for Practice Guidelines from 2012 to 2014; President of the European Society of Cardiology (ESC) from 2008 to 2010; Vice President & Chairman of the ESC Associations, Councils & Working Groups 2004–2006; Executive Board Member and Chairman of the ESC Education Committee 2002–2004; President of the World Section of the International Society for Heart Research (ISHR) from 2004 to 2007 and Treasurer from 1994 to 2002. He was Chairman of the ESC Working Group on Cellular Biology 1994–1996, Chairman of the EURObservational Research Program (EORP) of the European Society of Cardiology, Director of the School for Clinical and Epidemiologic Researchers, Board member of the World Heart Federation as a representative of Italy and founder and president of the scientific foundation Fondazione Anna Maria Sechi per il Cuore (FASC) in honor of his cousin.

=== Editorial boards ===
He is Editor-in-Chief of the European Heart Journal Supplements: the Heart of the Matter and Editor of Dialogues in Cardiovascular Medicine.

His contributions to the field of cardiology include several books, over 800 published peer-reviewed papers, citation numbers nearing 50 000, and an H-index that is close to 90.

== Honors and awards ==
- Kobe City Award (1992)
- Gold Medal of International Society for Heart Research World Section (1999)
- Gold Medal of the European Society of Cardiology (2010)
- Andreas Gruntzig Award of the Swiss Society of Cardiology (2013)
- Professor Emeritus of the University of Ferrara (2022)
- Lifetime Achievement Award of the Heart Failure Association of the European Society of Cardiology (2022)

== Scientific contributions ==
Ferrari's scientific contributions are recognized in both the field of basic and translational medicine, as well as clinical research. Ferrari's extensive research contributions have led to significant changes in cardiology practice guidelines and resulted in the successful registration of related pharmaceutical products.

=== Translational medicine ===
Ferrari's contributions in basic and Medicina traslazionale encompass 4 distinct areas:

- Illustrating the dangers pertaining to the neuroendocrine activation in untreated patients suffering from severe heart failure and providing an evidenced scientific basis for anti-neuroendocrine therapy using ACEi, beta blockers, and mineral corticoid antagonists. Studies conducted in India, at the PGI Institute, Chandigarh, Punjab in collaboration with Prof I. Anand, Prof P. Harris, P. Poole Wilson.
- Understanding the mechanisms and clinical relevance of the hibernating myocardium, provided the suggestion of using echocardiography with dobutamine as a test for cardiac surgery in patients with severe reduction of ejection fraction. Studies conducted in collaboration with Prof S. Rahimtoola.
- Elucidating the role of coronary arteries as well as endothelial apoptosis and regeneration clarified the superiority of ACEi vs angiotensin antagonists to protect the heart against progression of atherosclerosis.
- Comprehending the functional roles of the life and death cycle, and that failing myocytes lead to the pathophysiological understanding of remodeling. Presented future investigative opportunities related to the Herceptin drug mechanism of action of, marking the start of the Cardio-oncology era.

=== Clinical medicine ===
Ferrari's contributions in clinical medicine have led to changes in cardiology practice guidelines and facilitated the registration of pharmaceutical products in 5 distinct areas:

- EUROPA (The European trial on reduction of cardiac events with Perindopril in stable coronary Artery disease) trial has demonstrated the usefulness of perindopril in reducing the progression of coronary atherosclerosis. The use thereof has been endorsed by the European Medicines Agency (EMA) and by extension, the therapeutic use of perindopril in the treatment of hypertension to ischemic heart disease is both recognized and recommended in American and European guidelines alike.
- BEAUTIFUL (Morbidity-mortality Evaluation of the If inhibitor ivabradine in patients with coronary disease and left-ventricular dysfunction) trial demonstrates the effects of ivabradine in patients with ischemic heart disease and left ventricular dysfunction. The outcomes of this trial facilitated the successful registration of ivabradine through EMA for treatment of ischemic heart disease in patients intolerant to beta blocker therapy with a heart rate of > 70 b/min.
- SHIFT (Systolic Heart failure treatment with the IF inhibitor ivabradine Trial) showed the benefits of ivabradine in heart failure patients and allowed the registration at EMA and FDA of perindopril in heart failure patients with heart rate > 70 b/min and its indication in the American and European guidelines.
- SIGNIFY (Study assessing the morbidity-mortality benefits of the If inhibitor ivabradine in patients with coronary artery disease) contributed to the understanding of ivabradine according to the left ventricular function. This has led in increased indication precision for the treatment of ischemic heart diseases.
- ATPCI (efficacy and safety of Trimetazidine in patients with angina pectoris having been treated by percutaneous coronary intervention) trial demonstrated that trimetazidine does not improve either the symptoms or outcomes of post-angioplasty patients with ischemic heart disease. Trimetazidine indications observed in this pathology are currently under EMA directed revision.

== Steering committees ==
Ferrari has been on the steering committees of several multicenter trials as chairman of the following trials: PREAMI, EUROPA, STRATEGY, MULTI-STRATEGY, 3T2R, Beautiful, Shift, Signify, Modify, START-IF, ATPCI. And as the Executive Committee Member of the following trials: SENIORS, PACMAN, Clarify, COMPOSE, RELAX-AHF 2.

== Bibliography ==
- Ferrari, R.; Katz, A.; Shug, A.; Visioli, O. (1984). Myocardial Ischemia and Lipid Metabolism. New York: Plenum Press. ISBN 978-1-4684-4865-8.
- Ferrari, R.; Di Mauro, S.; Sherwood, G. (1992). L-carnitine and Its Role in Medicine: From Function to Therapy. London: Academic Press. ISBN 978-0-12-253940-4.
- Ferrari, R.; Opie, L. H. (1992). Atlas of the Myocardium. New York: Raven Press. ISBN 978-0-88167-870-3.
- Fox, K.; Ferrari, R. (2005). Heart Rate Management in Stable Angina. Taylor & Francis. ISBN 978-1-84184-594-4.
- Ferrari, R.; Mugelli, A.; Tavazzi, L.; Zaza, A. (2007). Il ritmo della vita: Cuore e frequenza cardiaca fra arte, cultura e scienza (in Italian). Roma: Viviani Editore. ASIN B00U3REW0O.
- Ferrari, R.; Florio, C. (2010). The European Cook Book: Healthy diets, healthy hearts. European Society of Cardiology. ISBN 978-2-9537898-0-5.
- Ferrari, R.; Ponikowski, P. (2012). Moving Forward in Management of Ischemic Cardiomyopathy. Paris: Springer. ISBN 978-2-8178-0277-0.
