= Katherine Ferrara =

American engineer

Katherine Whittaker Ferrara
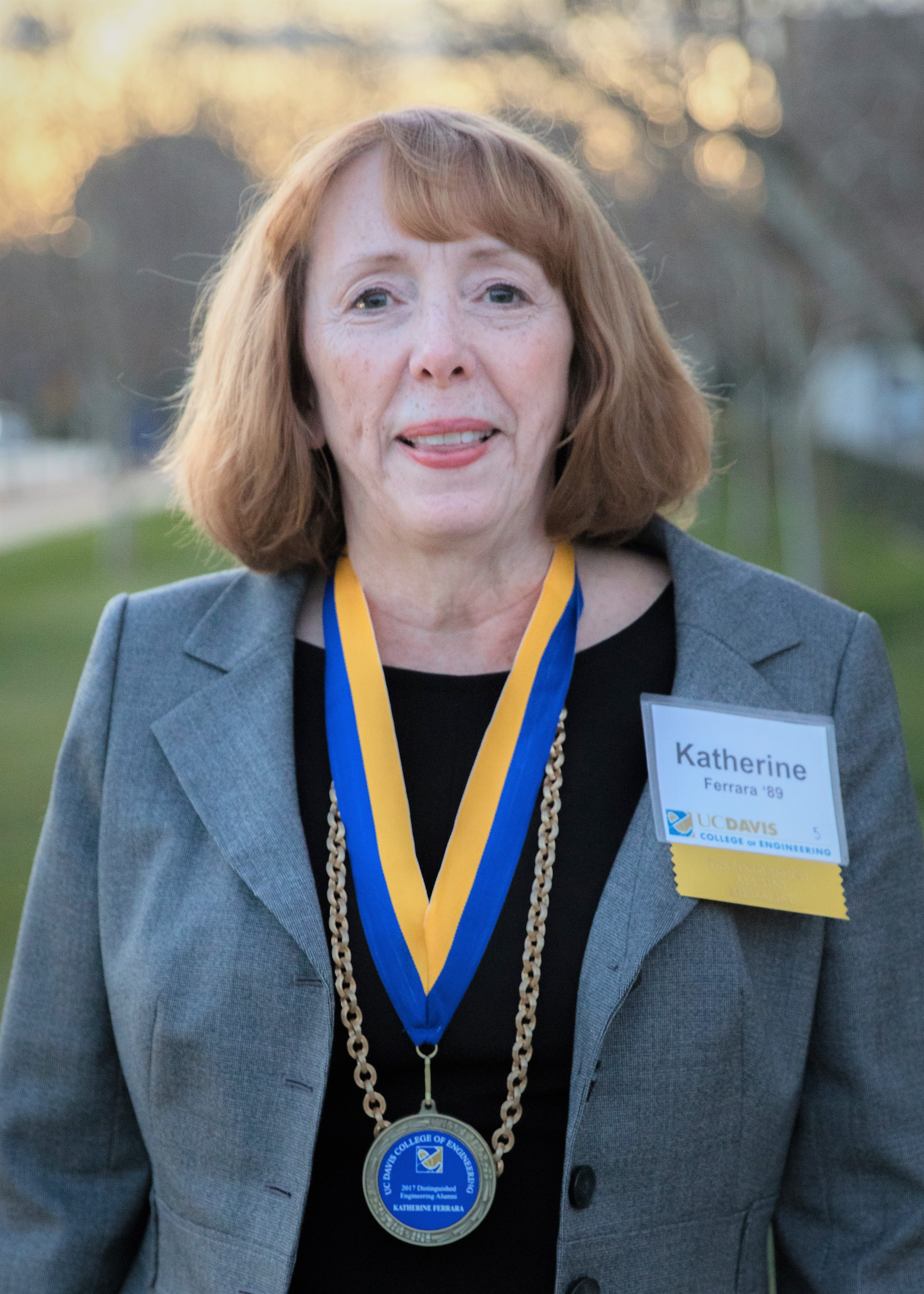
- Ferrara with UC Davis Distinguished Engineering Alumni Medal in 2018
- Education: University of California, Davis; California State University; University of Pittsburgh
- Scientific career
- Workplaces: University of Virginia; University of California, Davis; Stanford University
- Thesis: Wideband strategies for blood velocity estimation using ultrasound (1989)

Katherine Whittaker Ferrara is an American engineer who is a professor of radiology at Stanford University. Ferrara has been elected a Fellow of the American Association for the Advancement of Science, Institute of Electrical and Electronics Engineers and American Institute for Medical and Biological Engineering.

She has pioneered the use of ultrasound to image cardiovascular disease and cancer.

Ferrara was elected a member of the National Academy of Engineering in 2014 for contributions to theory and applications of biomedical ultrasonics.

== Early life and education ==
Ferrara grew up in Pennsylvania. She originally thought she wanted to become a physical therapist. She earned her bachelor's degree at the University of Pittsburgh. After earning her doctoral degree she joined General Electric, where she worked on early magnetic resonance imaging and ultrasound technologies. When General Electric moved from California to Milwaukee, Ferrara returned to academia. She was a master's student at California State University, Sacramento, where she used microprocessors to synthesize speech. Ferrara moved to the University of California, Davis for her graduate research, where she developed ultrasound methods to measure blood velocity. After graduating she worked as an associate professor at the California State University, Sacramento.

== Research and career ==
Ferrara was appointed to the faculty at the University of Virginia in 1989. In 1998 Ferrara returned to the University of California, Davis. In 2000 Ferrara founded the University of California, Davis Department of Biomedical Engineering, supported by a $12 million award from the Whitaker Foundation. When she stepped down as Head of Department in 2005, the new department had risen to the 23rd in the United States. At University of California, Davis, her research considered cancer diagnosis and image-guided drug delivery. Image-guided drug delivery makes use of medical imaging methods (including positron emission tomography and magnetic resonance imaging) to target drug delivery.

Her research crosses several themes, including immunotherapy, molecular imaging, ultrasound thermometry and image guided therapies. In particular, Ferrara has focussed on ultrasound therapy guided with magnetic resonance imaging, nanoparticle based cardiovascular imaging and image-guided drug delivery. A challenge in cancer therapeutics is that the treatments are often toxic, and getting high enough doses to diseased tissue can result in significant damage. To focus ultrasound for chemotherapy and immunotherapy Ferrara combines an annular array and Bruker MRI.

Ferrara makes use of nanoparticle encapsulation and ultrasound to achieve high target-to-background imaging. Alongside their work on cancer, the nanoparticles developed by Ferrara and co-workers can be used to image and deliver microRNA treatments for the treatment of damaged heart tissues.

In 2018 Ferrar joined Stanford University as a professor of radiology. She has extensively investigated the physics of microbubbles, which led her to believe that these may offer some therapeutics for ultrasound. At Stanford Ferrara has explored the use of microbubbles injected with a therapeutic agent as a treatment for breast cancer, using ultrasound to selectively destroy the microbubbles (through resonance) when they reach the appropriate location.

== Awards and honors ==
- 1995 American Institute of Ultrasound in Medicine Terrence Matzuk award
- 1999 Whitaker Foundation George Thorn award for Biomedical Engineering research
- 2004 Elected Fellow of the Acoustical Society of America
- 2005 Elected Fellow of the American Institute for Medical and Biological Engineering
- 2009 Elected Fellow of the American Association for the Advancement of Science
- 2010 Elected Fellow of the Institute of Electrical and Electronics Engineers
- 2012 IEEE Achievement Award
- 2013 University of California, Davis Distinguished Professor
- 2014 Election to National Academy of Engineering
- 2017 IEEE Distinguished Lecturer in Ultrasonics
- 2017 University of California, Davis Distinguished Engineering Alumni Medal
- 2019 Association of Women in Science Judith Poole Award
- 2019 World Molecular Imaging Society Gold Medal
- 2021 IEEE Biomedical Engineering Award

== Selected publications ==
- Ferrara, Katherine; Pollard, Rachel; Borden, Mark (2007-08-15). "Ultrasound Microbubble Contrast Agents: Fundamentals and Application to Gene and Drug Delivery". Annual Review of Biomedical Engineering. 9 (1): 415–447. doi:10.1146/annurev.bioeng.8.061505.095852. ISSN 1523-9829. PMID 17651012.
- Chomas, J.E.; Dayton, P.; Allen, J.; Morgan, K.; Ferrara, K.W. (2001). "Mechanisms of contrast agent destruction". IEEE Transactions on Ultrasonics, Ferroelectrics, and Frequency Control. 48 (1): 232–248. doi:10.1109/58.896136. ISSN 1525-8955. PMID 11367791. S2CID 10013402.
- Qin, Shengping; Caskey, Charles F; Ferrara, Katherine W (2009-07-06). "Ultrasound contrast microbubbles in imaging and therapy: physical principles and engineering". Physics in Medicine and Biology. 54 (14): R27-57. doi:10.1088/0031-9155/54/14/c01. ISSN 0031-9155. PMC 2818980. PMID 19229096.
