= Gustavo Petta =

Brazilian politician (born 1980)

Federal Deputy for São Paulo
- Incumbent
- Assumed office February 1, 2011

Personal details
- Born: December 26, 1980 (age 45) Campinas, São Paulo, Brazil
- Party: Communist Party of Brazil (PCdoB) (1997–present)
- Spouse: Silvia Petta
- Children: Guilherme Petta
- Occupation: Student
- Profession: Politician

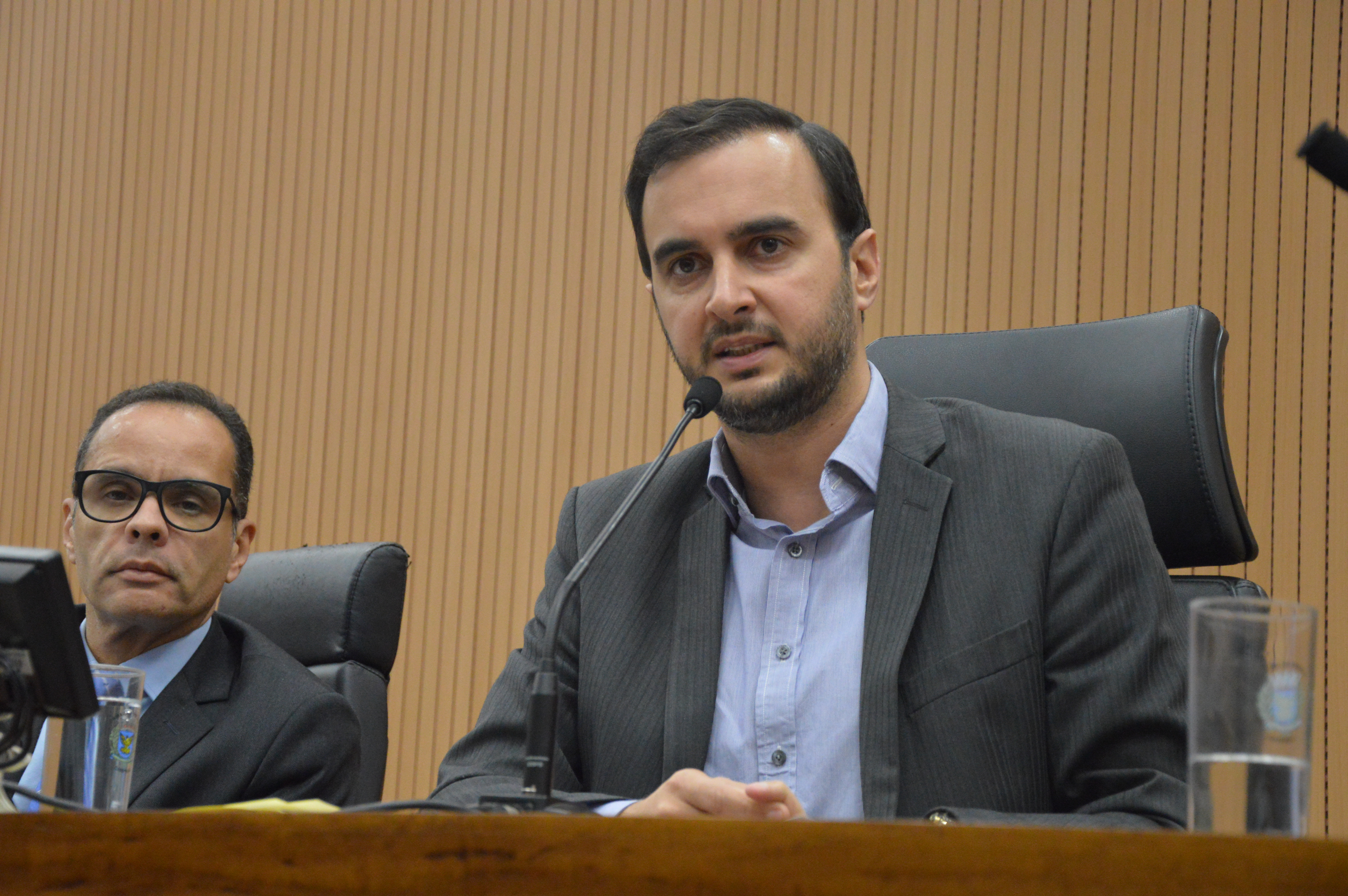
Petta c. 2019

Gustavo Lemos Petta (born December 26, 1980, in Campinas) is a Brazilian politician and former president of Brazil's National Union of Students (União Nacional dos Estudantes) from 2003 to 2007.
