= Lorenzo Fabbri =

- Inspector Rex character
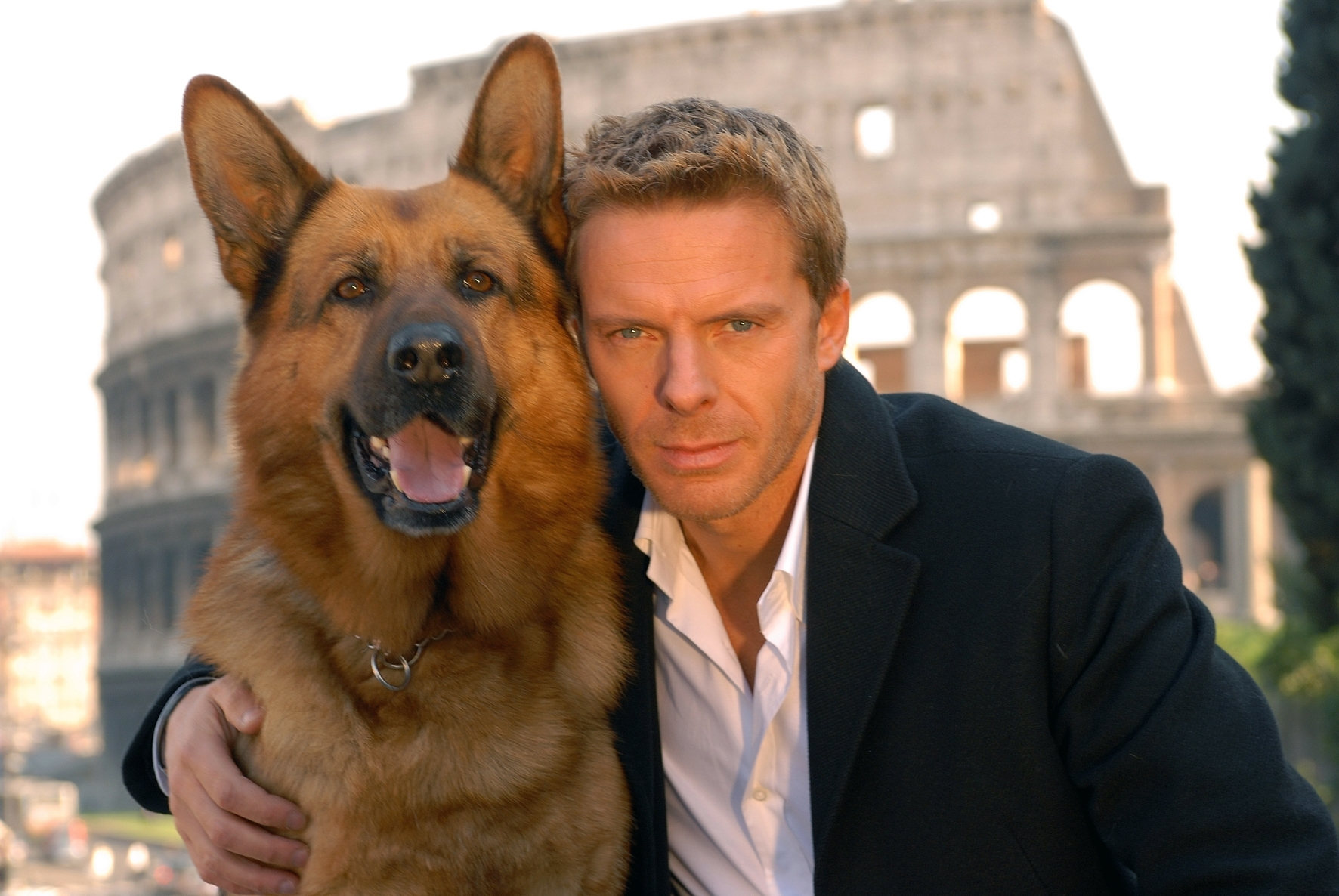
- Created by: Peter Hajek; Peter Moser
- Portrayed by: Kaspar Capparoni

In-universe information
- Nickname: Lorenzo
- Title: Inspector
- Spouse: Rex
- Significant others: List of Inspector Rex characters

Lorenzo Fabbri is a fictional character from the police drama television series Inspector Rex, which airs on RAI in the Italy. The character was created by series' producer Peter Hajek and Peter Moser, and is portrayed by Actor Kaspar Capparoni. In series 11, Rex moves to Rome. His new partner is Italian homicide detective, Chief Inspector Lorenzo Fabbri. He seems to understand the Italian language quite easily. In the second episode of season 14 (entitled "Amidst the Wolves") Fabbri dies in the explosion of a car during a trap prepared by a Mafia boss.
