= Vince Ferraro =

American business executive

- Born: Vincent Louis Ferraro; Glendale, California
- Education: San Diego State University, Arizona State University
- Occupation: Business executive
- Website: http://vincentferraro.com/

Vince Ferraro is an American business executive. He holds the position of global marketing vice president positions at Hewlett-Packard, working with the company since 1983 until 2008, and vice president of marketing at Eastman Kodak.

== Education ==
Vince Ferraro graduated from San Diego State University with a Bachelor of Science degree in business administration and an MBA from Arizona State University.

== Career with Hewlett-Packard ==
Ferraro started working for Hewlett-Packard in 1983 as a senior financial analyst. Over the years, he was promoted to several management and executive positions, including North American channel marketing director for commercial national accounts and vice president of marketing for several divisions of the company. In addition to marketing, he used his blog to help mitigate compatibility problems between HP products and Microsoft Vista. In 2007 and 2008 Ferraro was a speaker at the Chief Marketing Officer Council summit. Ferraro spent over twenty-five years with the company and eventually retired from HP as VP of Worldwide Marketing for the LaserJet business in 2008.

== Later career ==
In 2011 Ferraro made national news when he attempted to trademark Occupy Wall Street. In the comment for Wall Street Journal, he said this claim "has nothing to with their cause. I have no comment about their political grievances or organization. I’m not in any way affiliated with them ... I just see alternative uses for the trademark."

After leaving HP Ferraro worked for several smaller companies as interim marketing executive and consultant, until taking the position of Vice President of Marketing for the digital printing solutions business of Eastman Kodak. In this position, Ferraro has served as a spokesman for new Kodak products. Under his direction, in 2011 the company won nineteen awards from the International Association of Printing House Craftsmen. He was eventually promoted to Vice President of Corporate and Consumer Marketing at Kodak. He is a long-time member of the Chief Marketing Officer Council Advisory Board. He is also a Springboard Business Advisor for the Connection Foundation.

== Authored books ==
Ferraro has authored or co-authored two non-fiction books.

- In It To Win It (co-author). CelebrityPress, May 2012 ISBN 0-9853643-3-5
- Brand to Sell Masterplan. Abundant Press, November 2015 ISBN 0-692-61366-8
