= Ferreyra =

Ferreyra is a surname meaning 'smith'. Notable people with the surname include:

- Alejandro Garnacho Ferreyra (born 2004), Argentine footballer
- Beatriz Ferreyra (born 1937), Argentine composer
- Bernabé Ferreyra (1909–1972), Argentine footballer
- Daniel Ferreyra (born 1982), Argentine football goalkeeper
- Darío Ferreyra (born 1997), Argentine footballer
- David Ferreyra Martínez (born 1973), Mexican politician
- Diego Ferreyra (born 1997), Chilean cyclist
- Facundo Ferreyra (born 1991), Argentine footballer
- Felipe Souza Ferreyra (born 1998), Brazilian footballer
- Fernando Ferreyra Olivares (born 1963), Mexican politician
- Germán Ferreyra (born 1996), Argentine footballer
- Gustavo Ferreyra (born 1972), Uruguayan retired footballer and manager
- José A. Ferreyra (1889–1943), Argentine film director, screenwriter and film producer
- Juan Antonio Ferreyra (born 1958), Argentine musician better known as JAF
- Juan Carlos Giménez Ferreyra (born 1960), Paraguayan boxer
- Julio Ferreyra (born 1942), Argentine politician
- Leonardo Ferreyra (born 1991), Argentine footballer
- Luciano Ferreyra (born 2002), Argentine footballer
- Luis Emilio de Souza Ferreira Huby (1908–2008), Peruvian footballer
- Luis Eduardo Barreto Ferreyra (1954–2011), Uruguayan comic book artist
- Malevo Ferreyra (Mario Oscar Ferreyra) (1945–2008), Argentine police chief
- Mariano Ferreyra (1987–2010), Argentine student who was murdered
- Martín Ferreyra (born 1996), Argentine footballer
- Nicolás Ferreyra (born 1993), Argentine footballer
- Osmar Ferreyra (born 1983), Argentine former footballer
- Ramón Alejandro Ferreyra (1910–2005), Peruvian botanist
- Roque Ferreyra (1810–1885), Argentine politician
- Sergio Ferreyra (born 1977), Argentine former swimmer
- Victor Ferreyra (born 1964), Argentine former footballer
