= Cora Fabbri =

American poet

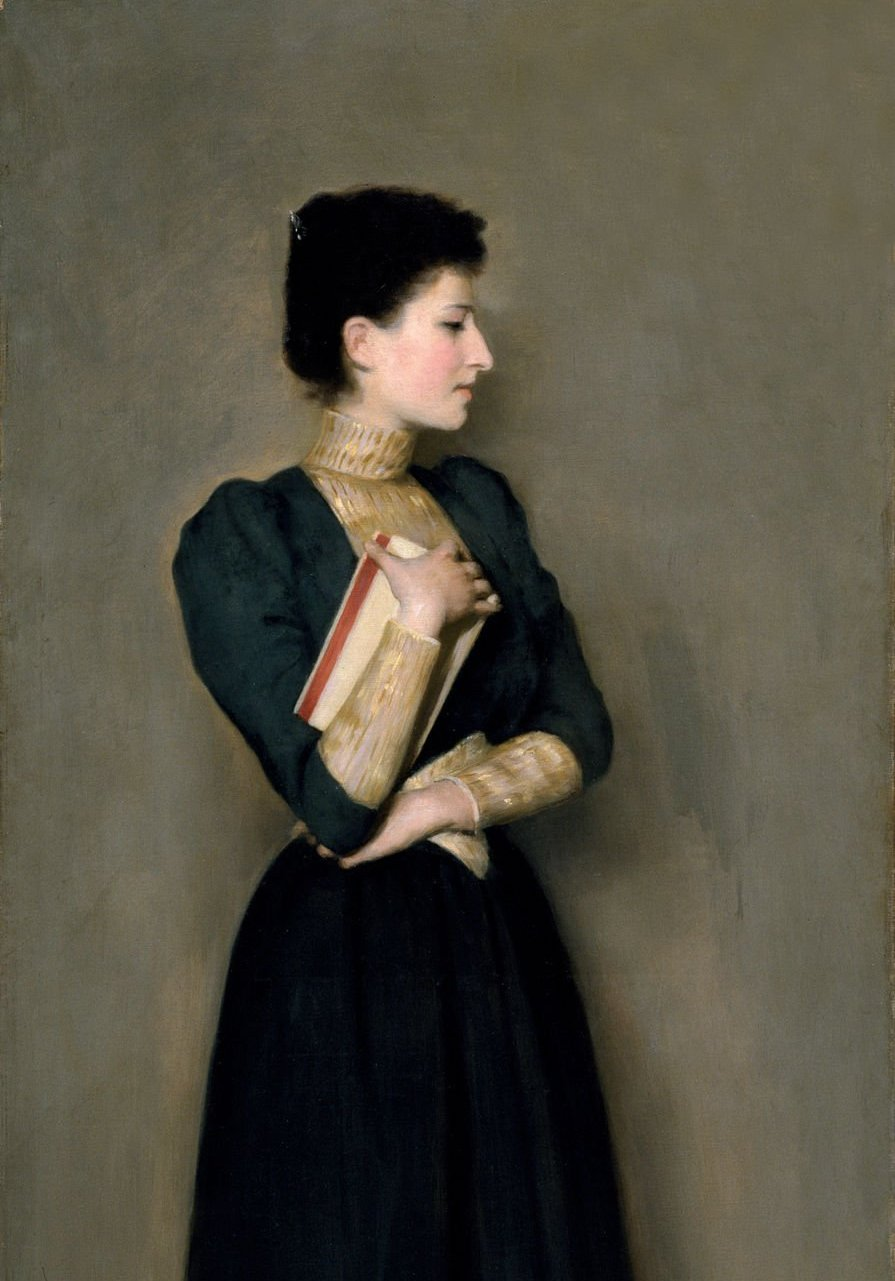
- portrait of Cora Fabbri by her brother Egisto Paolo Fabbri
- Born: November 27, 1871; New York City
- Died: January 12, 1892 (aged 20); Sanremo
- Occupation: Poet, writer

Cora Randall Fabbri (November 27, 1871 – January 12, 1892) was an American poet. She died at the age of twenty, shortly before her only book of poetry, Lyrics (1892), was published.

Cora Fabbri was born on November 27, 1871 in New York City. She was one of eight children of a wealthy Italian-American businessman, Ernesto Giuseppe Fabbri, and an American woman, Sara Randall, daughter of his business partner. Ernesto Fabbri died in 1883, and the family moved to Florence under the care of Ernesto's brother, Egisto Paolo Fabbri, another wealthy businessman and early partner of J. P. Morgan.

Fabbri began writing and publishing poetry in magazines in her teenage years. A collection of her work, Lyrics, was published by Harper & Brothers in 1892. A number of poems by Fabbri were set to music by Amy Beach and Liza Lehmann.

Cora Fabbri died on 12 January 1892 in Sanremo. According to her brother, she died of a pulmonary illness ten days before the publication of Lyrics.
