= Jon V. Ferrara =

American entrepreneur

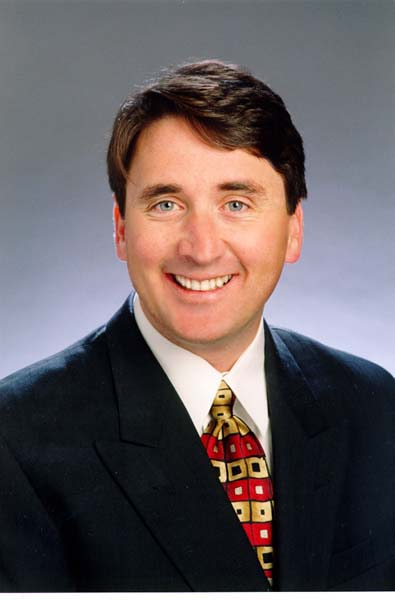
Jon Ferrara

Jon V. Ferrara (born January 22, 1960) is an American entrepreneur and the founder of Nimble LLC, his most recent venture. Ferrara is best known as the co-founder of GoldMine Software Corp, one of the early pioneers in the Sales Force Automation (SFA) and Customer Relationship Management (CRM) software categories for Small to Medium-sized Businesses (SMBs).

== Influence and honors ==
Ferrara has been recognized for pioneering innovation with honors such as the 1997 Ernst & Young Entrepreneur of the Year. His company GoldMine Software, ranked #154 on the 1997 Inc. 500, a national "Fast 500" company, swept the computer industry awards. Highlights include being awarded back-to-back-to-back-to-back PC Magazine's "Editor's Choice" (August 1993, August 1995, April 1996 and August 1997). He is a graduate of California State University, Northridge.

== Career ==
Prior to founding GoldMine Software, Ferrara was one of the early employees at Banyan Vines.
