= Johann Angelo Ferrari =

Austrian entomologist (1806–1876)

Johann Angelo Ferrari (1806 – 18 May 1876) was an Austrian entomologist born in Italy who specialised in Coleoptera especially Scolytidae He is not to be confused with Pietro Mansueto Ferrari, also an entomologist. He wrote Die Forst- und Baumzuchtschädlichen Borkenkäfer (Tomicides Lac.) aus der Familie der Holzverderber (Scolytides Lac.), mit besonderer Berücksichtigung vorzüglich der europäischen Formen, und der Sammlung der k. k. zoologischen Kabinettes in Wien. Gerolds Sohn, Wien
