= Ferrera (surname) =

Ferrera is a surname. Notable people with the surname include:

- America Ferrera (born 1984), American actress
- Benigno Ferrera (1893–1988), Italian cross-country skier
- Dennis Ferrera (born 1980), Honduran footballer
- Emilio Ferrera (born 1967), Belgian footballer and manager
- Francisco Ferrera (1794–1851), president of Honduras
- Giuseppe Ferrera (fl. 1928), Italian long-distance runner
- Manu Ferrera (born 1958), Spanish-born football coach
- Mario Ferrera (born 1987), Spanish male volleyball player
- Miguel Ferrera (born 1981), Honduran taekwondo practitioner
- Yannick Ferrera (born 1980), Belgian footballer and manager
- Yesenia Ferrera (born 1998), Cuban artistic gymnast

== See also ==
- Ferrari (surname)
- Ferreri (disambiguation)
- Ferrero (surname)
