= Michele Ferrero (priest) =

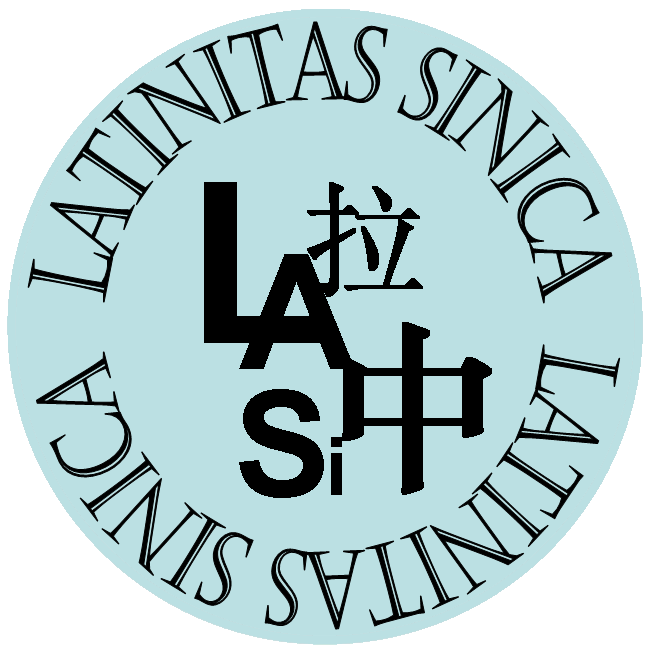
Logo Latinitas Sinica

Michele Ferrero (born 1967) is an Italian Catholic priest, teacher and writer; in 2025 he is living and working in China.

He was born in Cuneo, Italy, Salesian of Don Bosco, Professor of Moral Theology and Classics, graduated from Taipei Fu Jen Catholic University. Faculty of Theology.

He holds a doctoral degree in theology and a degree in Classics ("Laurea in Lettere Classiche") from the State University of Torino (Italy). He has served in Taiwan, Hong Kong, Shanghai, Turin, Italy and Jerusalem.

In late 2025, he is teaching Latin and Western Classics at Beijing Foreign Studies University. He works as Foreign Expert in Latin at the International Institute of Chinese Studies (formerly known as National Research Centre of Overseas Sinology) of Beijing Foreign Studies University.

== Career ==
In June 2011, he promoted the first conference on “The teaching of Latin language in Chinese universities” at the Beijing Foreign Studies University. In 2012, he founded "Latinitas Sinica", Centre for Latin Language and Culture.

He is also chief editor of the "Journal of Latin Language and Culture".

== Writing career ==
He is the author of books and articles about Taiwan, China and moral theology.

He is the author of "The cultivation of virtue in Matteo Ricci's The true meaning of the Lord of Heaven" (Fu Jen Catholic University Press, Taipei, 2004), an important study on moral issues common to the Christian and the Confucian traditions.

He wrote "Il Cardinale Zen. Rosso Speranza" (Torino, Elledici, 2007). He also wrote "Tuo padre ed io ti cercavamo" (with R. Spataro, Jerusalem, Latin Patriarchate Printing Press, 2007); “Saint Paul educator to faith and love” (with R. Spataro, Latin Patriarchate Printing Press, Jerusalem, 2008), “Sinologia Spirituale”, LAS, Roma, 2011.

Among his other publications are “Il prato dell’arcobaleno” (Torino: LDC, 1991);“Dalla Selecta ex Christianis Latinis Scriptoribus di don Bosco alla “Corona Patrum” della SEI”, in: G. Proverbio (ed.), “Dum Docent Discunt. Per una Didattica delle Lingue Classiche”, Patron, Bologna, 2000; “Grano e riso”(Cuneo: Primalpe, 2002); “Ira e sacrificio nel Confucianesimo”, in: M. Marin - M. Mantovani, Ira e sacrificio: negazione del divino e dell'umano? LAS, Rome, 2004; "Education in Confucianism", in: C. Desbouts - M. Mantovani, "Didattica delle scienze", Libreria Editrice Vaticana, Roma, 2010. “Matteo Ricci, Cicerone e il concetto di «rito» nel confucianesimo”, in: Rivista liturgica 97, no. 2 (mar/apr 2010) “The extraordinary experience of priesthood of Father Matteo Ricci (1552-1610)”, in: Caputa G. - Fox J., “Priests of Christ in the Church for the World”, Studium Theologicum Salesianum, Jerusalem, 2010. “Chinese Classics in Matteo Ricci’s 天主实义 and its reception in Korea”, in: Korea University, “Chinese Classics and the culture of East Asia” (中国古代文化和东Asia, the book is in Korean, Chinese and English), Korea University Press, 2010. - “The Latin translations of Confucius' Dialogues (Lun Yu). A comparison of key concepts”, in: Confucius and Cicero Old Ideas for a New World, New Ideas for an Old World, Ed. by Balbo, Andrea / Ahn, Jaewon. Series: Roma Sinica 1 De Gruyter, Berlin/Boston, 2019. “L’evoluzione storica della parola latina per “Cina””, in Salesianum 4/2011.The Latin Translations of Confucian Terminology on Government and Rule in a 16th Century Manuscript of Michele Ruggieri, S.J.，in: Empire and Politics in the Eastern and Western Civilizations: Searching for a 'Respublica Romanosinica' (Roma Sinica, 2) edited by Balbo, Andrea, Ahn, Jaewon, Kim, De Gruyter; Edition (22. August 2022).

His articles have appeared on periodicals of the following institutions: Salesian University, Rome; Fudan University (“Religion, Ethics, Moral Concern”, 2003), Shanghai, Holy Spirit Seminary, Hong Kong (“Ching Feng”); Seminary of Torino (“Archivio Teologico Torinese).

In 2014 the Commercial Press published his Latin grammar for Chinese students: "拉丁语基础教程 Lingua Latina ad Sinenses Discipulos Accomodata" and in 2016 the Commercial Press published "1234 Sententiae, Proverbia et Sigla Latina".

In 2019 published a transcription and translation in Italian of a manuscript containing the first Latin translation of the Confucian Classics: "Il Primo Confucio Latino", LAS, Rome, 2019. He also published in 2025 FERRERO, M.: "Mencio - trascrizione e traduzione del manoscritto di Ruggieri', LAS, Rome, 2025

=== Publications ===
Ferrero’s books include;

- "The Cultivation of Virtue in Matteo Ricci's 'The True Meaning of the Lord of Heaven': Issues For Moral Theology" (2004)
- "Your Father and I Were Seeking You" (2007)
- "Il Cardinale Zen. Rosso Speranza": La Vita e la China del Vescovo di Hong Kong (2007)
- "Saint Paul: Education to faith and love" (with Roberto Spataro) (2008)
- "Spiritual Sinology: (Imaginary) Letters From the Middle Ages to Our Times by 50 Missionaries Who Loved China" (2011)
- "China and Chinese Culture for Beginners" (2015)
- "1234 Latin Sentences You Should Remember" (2016)

== External references ==
- Latinitas sinica (Centre for Latin Language and Culture)
