= Hendrik C. Ferreira =

South African academic

- Education: University of Pretoria
- Occupation: Academic
- Organization: University of Johannesburg

Hendrik Christoffel Ferreira (1954 – November 20, 2018, in Johannesburg) was a professor in Digital Communications and Information Theory at the University of Johannesburg, Johannesburg, South Africa.

== Biography ==
He studied electrical engineering at the University of Pretoria, South Africa, where he obtained his Ph.D. in 1980. He worked as a visiting researcher at Linkabit in San Diego. He joined the Rand Afrikaans University in 1983, where, in 1989, he was appointed full professor. In recognition of his excellence in research and educating post-graduate students, he has been appointed as a research professor at the University of Johannesburg in 2007. He is a Fellow of the SAIEE, the South African Institute of Electrical Engineers.

Ferreira published close to 250 research papers on topics such as digital communications, power line communications, vehicular communication systems. With his work he introduced and developed a new theme in Information Theory, namely coding techniques for constructing combined channel codes, where error correction and channel properties are considered jointly.

Ferreira was a pioneering initiator and stimulator of the research fields of Information Theory and Power Line Communications in South Africa. He also was an organizer of the IEEE Information Theory Society and Power Line Communications within South Africa and Africa. He was a member of the Technical Committee for Power Line Communications of the IEEE Communications Society, and he served on the Technical Program Committee of several IEEE conferences, including the IEEE (ISIT) International Symposium on Information Theory, the IEEE (ISPLC) International Symposium on Power Line Communications, and the IEEE Africon and Chinacom conferences.

An obituary by his colleague Han Vinck was presented during a workshop in 2019.
