= Eric Ferrara =

American author & historian

Eric Ferrara is an American author, historian, educator, and entrepreneur; a fourth generation native New Yorker, and well known for discovering and uncovering parts of unknown or little known NYC history.

== Overview ==
Ferrara is founder and director of the Lower East Side History Project, an award-winning non-profit organization dedicated to researching, documenting and preserving the history of the greater Lower East Side of New York City.

Ferrara is also founder of the former "Museum of the American Gangster" and "East Village Visitor Center" in New York City.

== Bibliography ==
=== Books ===
- REVOLT: East Village Activism Literature, 1960s-1990s (Lower East Side History Project Press, Jan 2018, ISBN 978-1984123695)
- Lower East Side: Then & Now (Arcadia, Nov 2012, ISBN 978-0738597713)
- Lower East Side: Oral Histories (History Press, Nov 2012, ISBN 978-1609497941)
- Manhattan Mafia Guide (History Press, Jul 2011, ISBN 978-1609493066)
- The Bowery: A History of Grit, Graft and Grandeur (History Press, Feb 2011, ISBN 978-1609491789)
- A Guide to Gangsters, Murderers and Weirdos of NYC's Lower East Side (History Press, Jul 2009, ISBN 978-1596296770)

=== Articles ===
- "Ahoy? The St. Mark’s Place Navy," The Villager, March 1, 2012
- "Village’s ‘Little Hall of Fame’ had a memorable run," The Villager, February 23, 2012
- "Prison to Pad Thai, Bleecker building has seen it all," The Villager, February 16, 2012
- "A tale of two Manhattan Islands," The Villager, February 9, 2012

== Movie/TV Consultant & Appearances ==
- Metrofocus, discussing The Godfather, PBS (October 3, 2018)
- The Irishman Martin Scorsese/Netflix (2018)
- Ravenite: An Antisocial Social Club, Public Pictures (2015)
- “The Iceman” Richard Kuklinski, Discovery Channel (2015)
- Hunt For History, "The Mafia," H2/History Channel (2014)
- Copper, BBC America (2012)
- The Great Gatsby, Warner Brothers Pictures (2011)
- Secrets of New York, NYC-TV (2011)
- "Jack the Ripper: The German Suspect," National Geographic Channel (2011)
- Boardwalk Empire, HBO (2010)
- Ghost Hunters International, SyFy Network (2009)
- 50th anniversary re-release of the Lionel Rogosin classic, On The Bowery (2009)
