= Antonella Ferrara =

Italian control theorist and engineer

Antonella Ferrara (born 1963) is an Italian control theorist and engineer, known for her work on sliding mode control.

== Education and career ==
Ferrara is originally from Genoa, and studied electrical engineering at the University of Genoa, earning a laurea in 1987 and completing a Ph.D. in 1992. She became an assistant professor at the University of Genoa in 1992, and moved to the University of Pavia in 1998 as an associate professor. She was named professor of automatic control in 2005. At Pavia, she was originally affiliated with the department of computer engineering and systems science, and in 2011 became one of the founding members of a new department of electrical, computer, and biomedical engineering.

Ferrara chaired the Women in Control Committee of the IEEE Control Systems Society from 2013 to 2016.

== Recognition ==
Ferrara was named an IEEE Fellow in 2020 "for contributions to sliding mode control theory". She is also a Fellow of the International Federation of Automatic Control.

== Books ==
Ferrara is the coauthor of books including:

- Freeway Traffic Modelling and Control (with Simona Sacone and Silvia Siri, Springer, 2018)
- Advanced and Optimization Based Sliding Mode Control: Theory and Applications (with Gian Paolo Incremona and Michele Cucuzella, SIAM, 2019)
