= Belinda Ferrari =

Australian microbiologist

- Education: Macquarie University
- Scientific career
- Fields: Microbiology
- Workplaces: University of New South Wales

Belinda Carlene Ferrari is an Australian microbiologist who specialises in the genetics and ecology of soil bacteria and fungi, particularly in polar regions. She is an associate professor at the University of New South Wales (UNSW) in the School of Biotechnology and Biomolecular Sciences, where she heads a microbiology laboratory.

== Education ==
Ferrari gained a Bachelor of Science (Hons) from the University of New England in 1994 and a PhD in microbiology from Macquarie University in 2000.

She worked as a research fellow for several years, first at Sydney Water, then at the University of Copenhagen, and then at Macquarie University. In 2008 she was hired as a senior lecturer at University of Sydney, New South Wales, and in 2018 she was appointed an associate professor by UNSW and a Future Fellow of the Australian Research Council.

== Research ==
Ferrari's research has focused on the diversity of bacteria in the soil. Her studies include both Australia and Antarctica, as well as the Sub-Antarctic Macquarie Island, in collaboration with the Australian Antarctic Division. She and her co-workers have discovered new methods to cultivate soil bacteria in the laboratory, to reveal the breadth of organisms present and to isolate novel and rare bacterial species. Some of her work has studied the effects of diesel pollution on the ecology of Antarctic/Sub-Antarctic soils, including the bacteria and fungi that metabolise pollutants. She is a member of the National Committee for Antarctic Research of the Australian Academy of Science.

In 2017, a team of scientists led by Ferrari showed that bacteria could thrive in Antarctica, living only from the hydrogen, carbon dioxide, and carbon monoxide in the atmosphere. Because the conditions needed for the existence of these microorganisms are so minimal, the study has also cast light on the question of what would be needed for life to exist elsewhere in the universe besides Earth.

== Selected publications ==
- Mukan Ji, Chris Greening, Inka Vanwonterghem, Carlo R. Carere, Sean K. Bay, Jason A. Steen, Kate Montgomery, Thomas Lines, John Beardall, Josie van Dorst, Ian Snape, Matthew B. Stott, Philip Hugenholtz, Belinda C. Ferrari (2017). Atmospheric trace gases support primary production in Antarctic desert surface soil. Nature 552: 400–03 doi:10.1038/nature25014
- Belinda C Ferrari, Tristrom Winsley, Michael Gillings, Svend Binnerup (2008). Cultivating previously uncultured soil bacteria using a soil substrate membrane system. Nature Protocols 3: 1261–69
- Anne Mai-Prochnow, Jeremy S. Webb, Belinda C. Ferrari, Staffan Kjelleberg (2006). Ecological Advantages of Autolysis during the Development and Dispersal of Pseudoalteromonas tunicata Biofilms. Applied and Environmental Microbiology 72: 5414–20
- Belinda C. Ferrari, Svend J. Binnerup, Michael Gillings (2005). Microcolony cultivation on a soil substrate membrane system selects for previously uncultured soil bacteria. Applied and Environmental Microbiology 71: 8714–20
- Lars Hestbjerg Hansen, Belinda Ferrari, Anders Hay Sørensen, Duncan Veal, Søren Johannes Sørensen (2001). Detection of Oxytetracycline Production by Streptomyces rimosus in Soil Microcosms by Combining Whole-Cell Biosensors and Flow Cytometry. Applied and Environmental Microbiology 67: 239–44
- DA Veal, D Deere, B Ferrari, J Piper, PV Attfield (2000). Fluorescence staining and flow cytometry for monitoring microbial cells. Journal of Immunological Methods 243: 191–210
