= Pietro Mansueto Ferrari =

Italian entomologist (1823-1893)

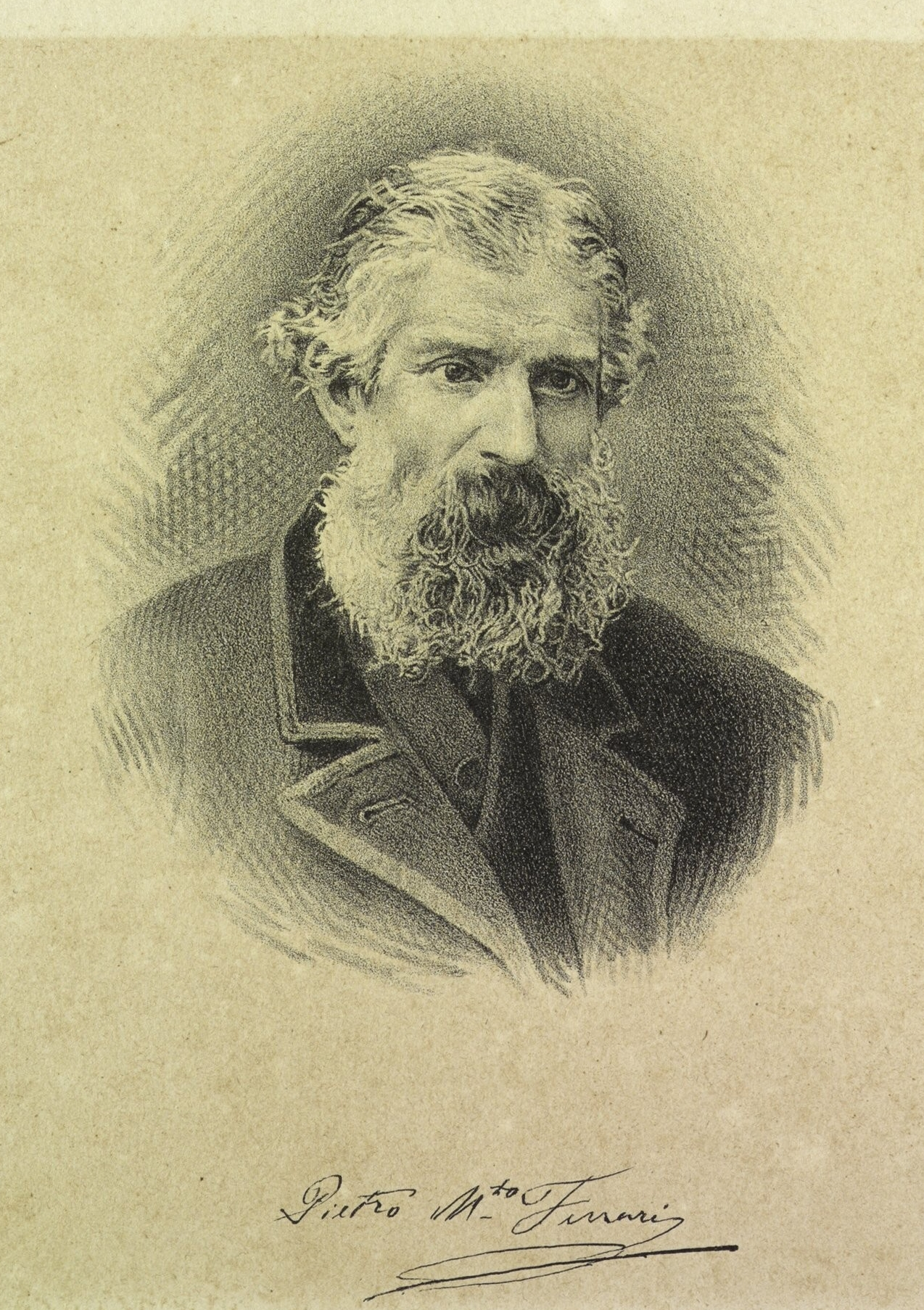
Pietro Mansueto Ferrari

Pietro Mansueto Ferrari (28 July 1823, Novi Ligure – 15 June 1893, Crosio, Alessandria) was an Italian physician and entomologist who specialised in Hemiptera, particularly Auchenorrhyncha. He is not to be confused with the entomologist Johann Angelo Ferrari.

Ferrari was born in Novi Ligure and studied medicine at the University of Genoa. He qualified in 1850 but did not practice much except during the cholera epidemic of 1855, when he offered his services in the village of Molini di Fiacconi. He moved to Genoa in 1856 and spent time studying botany and insects. He had studied under Giuseppe De Notaris, and he began to make a herbarium at his Tasssarolo castle. He collaborated with Giacomo Doria and Massimiliano Spinola and his wife Adelaide Pernigotti, sons Nino, Alfredo, Giuseppe, and daughter Clotilde Erizzo hosted musical evening parties at their home in Crosio. He later became especially interested in the hemiptera. Ferrari collected psyllids and aphids in Liguria, particularly near Genoa and Stazzano. In 1860, he taught natural science at a school in Genoa. He was offered a position at the University of Genoa but he refused to take it out of modesty. He studied German entomology works and also knew Latin. He also illustrated several species descriptions, including those based on specimens collected by Doria in Tunisia in 1881-82. He edited the annals of the Genoa museum. He also maintained birds in an aviary and attempted to breed warblers in captivity. His collections are held in the Genoa natural history museum where he worked.

His publications include:

- Cicadaria agri ligustici. Annali del Museo Civico di Storia Naturales di Genova 18: 75-165 (1882)
- Materiali per lo studio della fauna Tunisina raccoltida G. e L. Doria. Annali del Museo Civico di Storia Naturales di Genova. 1: 439-522 (1884)
- Rincoti omotteri raccolti nell'Italia centrale e meridionale dal Prof. G. Cavanna. Bullettino della Societá Entomologica Italiana. Firenze. 17: 269-92 (1885)
- Elenco dei rincoti Sardi che si trovano nella collezione del Museo Civico di Genova. Annali del Museo Civico di Storia Naturales di Genova. 6: 545-70 (1888)
- Res ligusticae XIX. Elenco dei rincoti ligustici (Emitteri e Cicadarii) fin'ora osservati. Annali del Museo Civico di Storia Naturales di Genova. 12: 549-576

and many other works describing new species. His collection including all his types is conserved in the Museo Civico di Storia Naturale di Genova
