= Ramona Ferreira =

Paraguayan journalist

Ramona Ferreira (1870 - ?), was a Paraguayan journalist and feminist.

Ferreira was trained to be a teacher, but she left teaching to work as a journalist, and she began writing for El Porvenir in 1901.

She became the first woman to publish a newspaper in Paraguay when she founded La voz del siglo (transl. The Voice of the Century) in 1902. She was critical of the institutions such as the church and colonial rule that she argued imposed gender roles on women and prevented them from exercising autonomy in society. Her ideas were controversial, prompting attacks on her facilities: the Salesians of Don Bosco attacked in 1902, and armed men attacked in 1904, with the latter attack destroying the facility.

Ferreira left Paraguay for Argentina, moving to Buenos Aires in 1905. Here she was briefly a teacher at the Lanús Secular School that incorporated progressivism into its curriculum. She took the position in August 1906, but the school's anarchist backers created an ideological rift among the school's faculty, and Ferreira left shortly after taking the position. She went on to write criticisms of the school, accusing the faculty of undermining authority within the school and allowing for corruption. Ferreira died in a fire at her home in Concepción, Paraguay. The feminist group "Las Ramonas" is named in her honor.
