= Lea Fabbri =

Croatian female basketball player

Personal information
- Born: January 14, 1985 (age 41) Zagreb, SFR Yugoslavia
- Listed height: 1.70 m (5 ft 7 in)

Career information
- WNBA draft: 2007: undrafted
- Position: Power forward / small forward

Career history
- 2007–2008: Šibenik Jolly
- 2011–2013: Trešnjevka 2009

Lea Fabbri (born 14 January 1985 in Zagreb, SFR Yugoslavia) is a Croatian female basketball player.
