= F. Richard Ferraro =

Dutch-born American psychologist

- Born: Francis Richard Ferraro; Amsterdam, Netherlands
- Education: State University of New York; University of Kansas
- Occupation: Psychologist

Francis Richard Ferraro is a Dutch-born American psychologist. He is the Chester Fritz Distinguished Professor in the department of psychology at the University of North Dakota.

In 2024, Ferraro was named Top Scholar by ScholarGPS, placing him among the top 0.05% of global scholars in social sciences.
