= Ferreira =

== People ==
- Ferreira (surname)
- Ferreira (footballer, born 1933), Antenor Ferreira de Carvalho Filho, Brazilian football forward
- Ferreira (footballer, born 1979), Josiesley Ferreira Rosa, Brazilian football striker
- Ferreira (footballer, born 1984), Antonio Ferreira de Oliveira Junior, Brazilian football centre-back
- Ferreira (footballer, born 1985), Severino Ferreira de Barros, Brazilian football goalkeeper
- Ferreira (footballer, born 1986), Leandro Ferreira Pessoa, Brazilian football midfielder
- Ferreira (footballer, born 1996), João Gabriel Ferreira Gomes, Brazilian football midfielder
- Ferreira (footballer, born 1997), Aldemir dos Santos Ferreira, Brazilian football forward

== Places ==
=== Argentina ===
- Ferreyra, in Córdoba Province, Argentina

=== Brazil ===
- Leandro Ferreira, municipality in Minas Gerais, Brazil
- Porto Ferreira, in the state of São Paulo, Brazil
- Estádio Aluízio Ferreira, a soccer stadium located in Porto Velho, Brazil

=== Portugal ===
- Ferreira do Alentejo, a municipality in the district of Beja
- Ferreira do Zêzere, a municipality in the district of Santarém District
- Ferreira (Macedo de Cavaleiros), a parish in the municipality of Macedo de Cavaleiros
- Ferreira (Paços de Ferreira), a parish in the municipality of Paços de Ferreira
- Ferreira (Paredes de Coura), a parish in the municipality of Paredes de Coura
- Caves Ferreira (Vila Nova De Gaia), one of the most popular Port wine cellars

=== South Africa ===
- Ferreirasdorp, a town in the greater Johannesburg Metro area

=== Spain ===
- Ferreira, Spain, a municipality of Granada Province, Spain (old Galician settlement)
- Ferreira, Coristanco, a parish in the municipality of Coristanco, Galicia
- Ferreira, San Sadurniño, a parish in the municipality of San Sadurniño, Galicia
- Ferreira, O Valadouro, a parish in the municipality of O Valadouro, Galicia
- Ferreira de Negral, a parish in the municipality of Palas de Rei, Galicia
- Ferreira de Pallares, a parish in the municipality of Guntín, Galicia
- Ferreira de Pantón, a parish in the municipality of Pantón, Galicia

== Other ==
- Ferreira, the name from 1895 to 1916 of the clipper ship originally named Cutty Sark
