= Gustavo (footballer, born 1997) =

Brazilian footballer

Personal information
- Full name: Gustavo Henrique Correia Pereira
- Date of birth: 11 January 1997 (age 29)
- Place of birth: Recife, Brazil
- Height: 1.80 m (5 ft 11 in)
- Position: Defender

Team information
- Current team: Vera Cruz-PE (on loan from Retrô)

Youth career
- –2018: Belo Jardim

Senior career*
Years	Team	Apps	(Gls)
2018	Belo Jardim	8	(1)
2018	Vera Cruz-PE	8	(0)
2019	Afogados da Ingazeira	11	(0)
2019–	Retrô	14	(0)
2020–	→ Vera Cruz-PE (loan)	7	(0)
- * Club domestic league appearances and goals as of 16:14, 17 November 2020 (UTC)

Gustavo Henrique Correia Pereira (born 11 January 1997), commonly known as Gustavo, is a Brazilian footballer who plays as a defender for Vera Cruz-PE, on loan from Retrô.

== Career statistics ==
As of 6 August 2020.

Club	Season	League			State League		Cup		Other		Total	
Club	Season	Division	Apps	Goals	Apps	Goals	Apps	Goals	Apps	Goals	Apps	Goals
Belo Jardim	2018	Série D	2	1	6 (Note: Appearances in the Campeonato Pernambucano)	0	0	0	0	0	8	1
Vera Cruz-PE	2018	–			8 (Note: Appearances in the Campeonato Pernambucano Série A2)	0	0	0	0	0	8	0
Afogados da Ingazeira	2019	–			11	0	0	0	0	0	11	0
Retrô	2019	–			13	0	0	0	0	0	13	0
Retrô	2020	–			1	0	0	0	0	0	1	0
Retrô	Total		0	0	14	0	0	0	0	0	14	0
Vera Cruz-PE (loan)	2020	–			7	0	0	0	0	0	7	0
Career total			2	1	36	0	0	0	0	0	48	1
