= Domenico Ferrari =

Italian violinist and composer (1722–1780)

Domenico Ferrari (1722 – 1780) was an Italian violinist and composer.

He was born in Piacenza in 1722, and was a pupil of Giuseppe Tartini. For a period, he lived in Cremona. He began to travel in 1749, finding great success in Vienna. In 1753, he became a member of the court orchestra at Stuttgart, where Pietro Nardini was leader. He twice visited Paris, performing successfully. He died – murdered, according to the report – in Paris in 1780.

Although he had great technical ability, contemporary critics thought that his playing style did not retain that of his teacher Tartini.

== Compositions ==
He wrote for the violin: he left a concerto, six trio sonatas and 36 sonatas for solo violin.
