= Gustavo Ferraro =

- Education: Universidad Católica Argentina, Claremont Graduate University
- Occupation: investment banker

Gustavo Ferraro is an Argentine investment banker who has worked for many years for major U.S. banks and investment firms, specializing in Latin America-focused investment banking and capital markets. He played the leading role in negotiating the terms of the 2010 restructuring of Argentina's sovereign debt.

== Early life and education ==
Ferraro attended the Universidad Católica Argentina from 1979 to 1983, receiving a degree in economics. He attended Claremont Graduate University from 1984 to 1986, receiving a master's degree in Business Administration.

== Career ==
From 1987 through 1994, Ferraro worked at Citibank in Sao Paulo, Brazil, where he was responsible for asset trading and for the coverage of Brazilian and multinational clients. From 1994 through 2000, as head of the Lehman Brothers office in Buenos Aires, he was in charge of that firm's business in Argentina and Chile. From 2000 through 2003, he worked at Salomon Smith Barney's Investment Bank, where he was head of TMT (Technology, Media & Telecom) for Latin America.

From 2003 to 2012, he worked at Barclays Investment Bank, where he served as a Managing Director of Barclays Capital, leading a team that covered the firm's largest Latin American corporate and sovereign clients, focusing on debt capital markets and liability management. While at Barclays, he played a key role in Argentina's 2005 and 2010 debt restructurings.

Since 2012, he has been Managing Director of Gramercy Funds Management LLC., where he serves as Head of Latin American Markets. He is responsible for implementing debt restructurings in Latin America and for sourcing, originating and executing transactions in the region. While at Gramercy, he has continued to play a central role in Argentina's debt arrangements.

== Argentine debt restructuring ==
On behalf of Barclays, Ferraro signed the 2008 Work Letter Agreement setting the terms of Argentina's debt restructuring, which was also signed by Juan Bruchou of Citibank, Marcelo Blanco of Deutsche Bank, and Argentine President Cristina Fernández de Kirchner. Ferraro, along with colleagues from Deutsche Bank and Citibank, had prepared the latest debt swap proposal 2009 “without compensation”, but with the understanding that they would eventually receive the customary commissions.

A November 2013 article noted that it was Ferraro who had had the “extravagant idea of getting the bondholders who entered the two exchanges to finance part of the payment to the holdouts, with the idea of avoiding a new default that would liquefy their holdings.” La Nación noted in November 2013 that Gramercy was one of five favored companies that were being paid as a result of ICSID (International Center for the Settlement of Investment Disputes) arbitration.
