= Ferrero (surname) =

Ferrero (Italian: [ferˈrɛːro], Spanish: [feˈreɾo]) is a surname of Italian (from Piedmont) and Spanish origin that means 'smith', a person who works with iron, in parallel with surnames like Ferraro, Ferrari and Smith.

Notable people with the surname Ferrero include:

- Alexis Ferrero (born 1979), Argentine footballer;
- Alfonso Ferrero La Marmora (1804–1878), Italian general and statesman;
- Benita Ferrero-Waldner (born 1948), Austrian diplomat and politician;
- Carlos Ferrero (1941–2025), Peruvian politician;
- Daniela Ferrero, Uruguayan and American mathematician;
- Edward Ferrero (1831–1899), Union general famous for his role in the Battle of the Crater;
- Enzo Ferrero (born 1953), Argentine footballer;
- Facundo Ferrero (born 1995), Argentine footballer;
- Francis Ferrero (born 1972), Argentine footballer;
- Giovanni Ferrero (born 1964), managing director of Ferrero SpA, son of Michele Ferrero;
- Guglielmo Ferrero (1871–1942), Italian historian, journalist, and novelist;
- Juan Ferrero (1918–1958), Spanish bodybuilder;
- Juan Carlos Ferrero (born 1980), Spanish tennis player;
- Lorenzo Ferrero (born 1951), Italian composer;
- Martin Ferrero (born 1947), American actor;
- Michele Ferrero (1925–2015), Italian chocolate magnate;
- Michele Ferrero (priest) (born 1967), Italian Roman Catholic priest and author;
- Pietro Ferrero (1898–1949), founder of Ferrero SpA, father of Michele Ferrero;
- Pietro Ferrero Jr. (1963–2011), managing director of Ferrero SpA until his death, son of Michele Ferrero;
- Ricardo Ferrero (1955–2015), Argentine footballer.

== See also ==
- Ferrara (surname)
- Ferraro
- Ferrera
