= List of most common surnames in South American countries =

This article contains lists of the most common surnames in most of the countries of South America, including two transcontinental countries. Countries are arranged in alphabetical order.

== Argentina ==
Most surnames are of Spanish and Italian origin.

Rank	Surname	Pop.	Pop. %
1	González	568,240	1.472%
2	Rodríguez	483,212	1.252%
3	Fernández	426,253	1.104%
4	García	411,462	1.066%
5	López	393,704	1.030%
6	Martínez	346,271	0.897%
7	Pérez	336,094	0.870%
8	Álvarez	294,527	0.763%
9	Gómez	290,821	0.753%
10	Sánchez	271,351	0.703%
11	Díaz	256,397	0.664%
12	Vásquez	187,974	0.487%
13	Castro	173,055	0.448%
14	Romero	166,497	0.431%
15	Suárez	160,483	0.415%
16	Blanco	154,248	0.399%
17	Ruiz	140,829	0.364%
18	Alonso	135,893	0.352%
19	Torres	133,599	0.346%
20	Domínguez	132,625	0.343%
21	Gutiérrez	130,607	0.338%
22	Sosa	129,372	0.335%
23	Iglesias	126,822	0.328%
24	Giménez	125,009	0.323%
25	Ramírez	124,550	0.322%
26	Martín	123,938	0.321%
27	Varela	119,674	0.310%
28	Ramos	118,825	0.307%
29	Núñez	118,106	0.306%
30	Rossi	116,775	0.302%
31	Silva	107,835	0.279%
32	Méndez	104,668	0.271%
33	Hernández	104,581	0.270%
34	Flores	100,092	0.261%
35	Pereyra	99,884	0.258%
36	Ferrari	98,761	0.255%
37	Ortiz	96,761	0.250%
38	Medina	96,228	0.249%
39	Benítez	95,628	0.247%
40	Herrera	94,781	0.245%
41	Arias	94,537	0.245%
42	Acosta	92,707	0.240%
43	Moreno	92,127	0.238%
44	Aguirre	91,365	0.236%
45	Otero	89,583	0.232%
46	Cabrera	88,398	0.229%
47	Rey	88,394	0.229%
48	Rojas	81,343	0.210%
49	Vidal	80,233	0.207%
50	Molina	80,050	0.207%
51	Russo	79,882	0.206%
52	Paz	75,365	0.195%
53	Vega	74,107	0.192%
54	Costa	73,932	0.191%
55	Bruno	73,907	0.191%
56	Romano	73,458	0.190%
57	Morales	71,587	0.185%
58	Ríos	71,534	0.185%
59	Miranda	70,713	0.183%
60	Muñoz	70,092	0.181%
61	Franco	70,055	0.181%
62	Castillo	69,720	0.180%
63	Campos	69,447	0.179%
64	Bianchi	68,510	0.177%
65	Luna	66,763	0.172%
66	Correa	66,535	0.172%
67	Ferreyra	66,461	0.172%
68	Navarro	66,457	0.172%
69	Quiroga	66,138	0.171%
70	Colombo	65,375	0.169%
71	Cohen	63,575	0.164%
72	Pereyra	63,367	0.163%
73	Vera	63,226	0.163%
74	Lorenzo	63,157	0.163%
75	Gil	62,727	0.162%
76	Santos	60,580	0.156%
77	Delgado	59,333	0.154%
78	Godoy	58,956	0.152%
79	Rivas	58,811	0.151%
80	Rivero	58,604	0.151%
81	Gallo	57,990	0.149%
82	Peralta	57,192	0.148%
83	Soto	55,633	0.144%
84	Figueroa	55,515	0.143%
85	Juárez	55,310	0.143%
86	Marino	54,806	0.142%
87	Ponce	54,009	0.139%
88	Calvo	52,282	0.135%
89	Ibáñez	51,972	0.134%
90	Cáceres	51,493	0.133%
91	Carrizo	50,657	0.131%
92	Vargas	50,613	0.131%
93	Mendoza	50,588	0.131%
94	Aguilar	49,717	0.128%
95	Ledesma	49,645	0.128%
96	Guzmán	49,543	0.128%
97	Soria	49,291	0.127%
98	Villalba	48,602	0.125%
99	Prieto	48,355	0.125%
100	Maldonado	47,344	0.122%
Top 100		11,632,320	30.093%
Total pop. (2005 est.)		38,592.150	100.000%

== Brazil ==
Most of the surnames of the Brazilian population have a Portuguese origin, due to Portuguese colonization in the country (it is estimated that 80% of the Brazilian population has at least one Portuguese ancestor), while other South American countries were largely colonized by the Spanish. However, due to historical immigration, there are also surnames of African, Arabic, German, Italian and Japanese origin. 2022 data:

Rank	Surname	Share of Brazilian population	Pop.	Origin
1	Silva	16.76%	34,030,104	Portuguese
2	Santos	10.52%	21,367,475	Portuguese
3	Oliveira	5.77%	11,708,947	Portuguese
4	Souza	4.53%	9,197,158	Portuguese
5	Pereira	3.39%	6,888,212	Portuguese
6	Ferreira	3.07%	6,226,228	Portuguese
7	Lima	3.00%	6,094,630	Portuguese
8	Alves	2.83%	5,756,825	Portuguese
9	Rodrigues	2.67%	5,428,540	Portuguese
10	Costa	2.39%	4,861,083	Portuguese
11	Sousa	2.36%	4,797,390	Portuguese
12	Gomes	1.99%	4,046,634	Portuguese
13	Nascimento	1.78%	3,609,232	Portuguese
14	Araujo	1.70%	3,460,940	Portuguese
15	Ribeiro	1.54%	3,127,425	Portuguese
16	Almeida	1.51%	3,069,183	Portuguese
17	Jesus	1.41%	2,859,490	Portuguese
18	Barbosa	1.35%	2,738,119	Portuguese
19	Soares	1.29%	2,615,284	Portuguese
20	Carvalho	1.28%	2,599,978	Portuguese
21	Martins	1.27%	2,576,764	Portuguese
22	Lopes	1.15%	2,337,914	Portuguese
23	Vieira	1.04%	2,102,389	Portuguese
24	Rocha	1.01%	2,044,495	Portuguese
25	Dias	1.00%	2,035,387	Portuguese
26	Gonçalves	1.00%	2,028,298	Portuguese
27	Fernandes	0.90%	1,835,974	Portuguese
28	Santana	0.89%	1,815,982	Portuguese
29	Andrade	0.84%	1,707,452	Portuguese
30	Batista	0.84%	1,703,130	Portuguese
Top 30		81,08%	164,670,662	—

== Chile ==
All surnames are Spanish in origin, with quite a few of them being Basque (e.g. Araya or Zúñiga).

#	Either 1st or 2nd surname	Persons
1	González	741,388
2	Muñoz	578,673
3	Rojas	413,897
4	Díaz	410,802
5	Pérez	326,867
6	Soto	298,062
7	Contreras	276,887
8	Silva	259,950
9	Martínez	252,966
10	Sepúlveda	251,078
11	Morales	248,448
12	Rodríguez	243,695
13	López	240,181
14	Fuentes	228,609
15	Hernández	226,848
16	Torres	226,480
17	Araya	224,232
18	Flores	221,231
19	Espinoza	219,375
20	Valenzuela	215,025
21	Castillo	213,321
22	Ramírez	211,191
23	Reyes	208,752
24	Gutiérrez	201,734
25	Castro	199,508
26	Vargas	198,471
27	Álvarez	193,002
28	Vásquez	189,946
29	Tapia	179,905
30	Fernández	179,246
31	Sánchez	178,615
32	Carrasco	172,877
33	Gómez	172,758
34	Cortés	171,370
35	Herrera	170,309
36	Núñez	165,806
37	Jara	161,085
38	Vergara	155,118
39	Rivera	147,835
40	Figueroa	145,460
41	Riquelme	143,590
42	García	142,002
43	Miranda	138,939
44	Bravo	138,392
45	Vera	137,646
46	Molina	131,094
47	Vega	128,132
48	Campos	126,260
49	Sandoval	125,640
50	Orellana	123,619
51	Zúñiga	120,757
52	Olivares	120,074
53	Alarcón	118,019
54	Gallardo	117,752
55	Ortiz	117,228
56	Garrido	115,109
57	Salazar	113,881
58	Guzmán	109,922
59	Henríquez	109,364
60	Saavedra	108,702
61	Navarro	107,897
62	Aguilera	107,864
63	Parra	106,100
64	Romero	105,597
65	Aravena	105,441
66	Pizarro	105,352
67	Godoy	103,887
68	Peña	103,377
69	Cáceres	102,830
70	Leiva	99,890
71	Escobar	97,979
72	Yáñez	96,589
73	Valdés	96,528
74	Vidal	96,037
75	Salinas	94,110
76	Cárdenas	93,925
77	Jiménez	92,032
78	Ruiz	91,539
79	Lagos	91,024
80	Maldonado	89,091
81	Bustos	88,445
82	Medina	87,578
83	Pino	86,295
84	Palma	82,735
85	Moreno	82,548
86	Sanhueza	82,383
87	Carvajal	81,785
88	Navarrete	81,729
89	Sáez	80,938
90	Alvarado	79,985
91	Donoso	79,855
92	Poblete	79,248
93	Bustamante	78,732
94	Toro	78,659
95	Ortega	78,086
96	Venegas	76,900
97	Guerrero	76,823
98	Paredes	75,825
99	Farías	75,242
100	San Martín	74,575
Top 100		15,802,580

#	1st surname	% of population
1	González	4.7
2	Muñoz	3.7
3	Rojas	2.6
4	Díaz	2.6
5	Pérez	2.1
6	Soto	1.9
7	Contreras	1.8
8	Silva	1.6
9	Martínez	1.6
10	Sepúlveda	1.6
Top 10		24.2

Note: The source (Civil Registry and Identification Service) does not mention the reference year (it was published in 2008) or whether the count includes only the first surname or both surnames (Chile uses two surnames, but the second one is rarely mentioned). It is assumed the first table refers to both surnames (it is unknown if people having the same first and second surname are counted once or twice) and the second table to the first surname only. It is also unclear whether Chileans living abroad were counted, although it is probable that those that were born in Chile were included, as they were registered at birth.

== Colombia ==
All names in the list are of Spanish origin (2010 data).

#	Surname	People
1	Rodríguez	707,789
2	Gómez	537,843
3	González	531,484
4	Martínez	530,721
5	García	524,835
6	López	509,880
7	Hernández	454,471
8	Sánchez	449,750
9	Ramírez	427,404
10	Pérez	418,660
11	Díaz	388,419
12	Muñoz	293,759
13	Rojas	286,038
14	Moreno	265,374
15	Jiménez	261,391

Source: National Civil Registry (2010)

== Guyana ==
All surnames are of Indian (of both the Hindu and Muslim faiths) or English origin.

Rank	Surname
1	Persaud
2	Singh
3	Williams
4	Khan
5	Thomas
6	Joseph
7	Henry
8	James
9	Mohamed
10	Smith

== Paraguay ==
The list of most common surnames in Paraguay, reflected in the national voters register, shows the influence of Castilian Spanish in the Paraguayan society.

Eight of the top 11 surnames end with "ez", the distinctive suffix of Castilian family names. The suffix "ez" means "son of"; thus, González means "son of Gonzalo", Benítez is "son of Benito" and Martínez means "son of Martín". This is similar to the suffix "son" in English (Johnson, "son of John", Jackson, "son of Jack") and to "ic" or "ich" of Slavic names such as Ivanovich ("son of Ivan").

Rank	%	Surname	Origin
1	6.62	González	Spanish
2	4.84	Benítez	Spanish
3	4.18	Martínez	Spanish
4	3.13	López	Spanish
5	2.61	Giménez	Spanish
6	2.54	Vera	Spanish
7	2.08	Duarte	Spanish
8	2.05	Ramírez	Spanish
9	2.01	Villalba	Spanish
10	1.94	Fernández	Spanish
11	1.81	Gómez	Spanish
12	1.78	Acosta	Spanish
13	1.76	Rojas	Spanish
14	1.69	Ortiz	Spanish
15	1.68	Cáceres	Spanish
16	1.58	Rodríguez	Spanish
17	1.57	Ruiz	Spanish
18	1.54	Núñez	Spanish
19	1.48	Ayala	Spanish
20	1.46	Báez	Spanish
21	1.39	Galeano	Spanish
22	1.34	Herrera	Spanish
23	1.27	Franco	Spanish
24	1.25	Torres	Spanish
25	1.25	Cardozo	Spanish

All surnames are of Spanish origin, except when noted.

== Peru ==
All surnames are of Spanish origin, except when noted.

Rank	% (of the sample)	Surname
1	2.175	Quispe (Quechuan surname)
2	2.144	Flores
3	2.031	Sánchez
4	1.987	Rodríguez
5	1.948	García
6	1.66	Rojas
7	1.456	González
8	1.434	Díaz
9	1.412	Chávez
10	1.403	Torres
11	1.395	Ramírez
12	1.373	Mendoza
13	1.364	Ramos
14	1.351	López
15	1.26	Castillo
16	1.26	Espinoza
17	1.172	Vásquez
18	1.076	Huamán (Quechuan surname)
19	1.072	Pérez
20	1.068	Vargas
21	1.042	Gutiérrez
22	0.985	Fernández
23	0.981	Castro
24	0.928	Mamani (Aymara surname)
25	0.928	Ruíz
26	0.854	Romero
27	0.846	Martínez
28	0.832	Morales
29	0.824	Reyes
30	0.802	Salazar

== Suriname ==
Rank	Surname
1	Lin
2	Pinas
3	Wong
4	Chin
5	Mohan
6	Kalloe
7	Singh
8	Lie
9	van Dijk
10	Tjin
11	Kluivert
12	Semil
13	Sabajo

== See also ==
- List of family name affixes
- List of most popular given names
- Lists of most common surnames, for other continents
