= Maldonado (surname) =

- Place of origin: Spain

Maldonado is a Spanish and Portuguese surname. Notable people with the surname include:

- Abel Maldonado (born 1967), American politician, 47th Lieutenant Governor of California
- Alana Maldonado (born 1995), Brazilian Paralympic judoka
- Alejandro Maldonado (athlete) (born 1977), Argentine Paralympic athlete
- Alejandro Maldonado (born 1936), 49th President of Guatemala
- Alexis Maldonado (born 2000), Mexican Youtuber also known as Quackity
- Alexis Maldonado (born 1997), Argentine professional footballer
- Alonso del Castillo Maldonado, Spanish explorer of the 16th century
- Ángel Maldonado (footballer) (born 1973), Mexican football (soccer) goalkeeper
- Candy Maldonado (Cándido Maldonado Guadarrama) (born 1960), Puerto Rican baseball player
- Carlos Maldonado (footballer) (born 1963), Venezuelan football (soccer) player
- Claudio Maldonado (born 1980), Chilean football (soccer) player
- Claudio Maldonado (musician) (born 1980), Argentine composer-performer
- Cristóbal Maldonado (1950–2019), Paraguayan footballer
- Diana Maldonado (born 1963), American politician, member of the Texas House of Representatives
- Eduardo Maldonado (born 1968), Bolivian politician
- Estuardo Maldonado (born 1928), Ecuadorian sculptor and painter
- Fabio Maldonado (born 1980), Brazilian boxer and mixed martial arts fighter
- Francisco Maldonado (1480–1521), leader of the rebel Comuneros in the Revolt of the Comuneros, who was captured and beheaded at the Battle of Villalar, Spain
- Francisco José Maldonado (born 1981), Spanish football (soccer) player
- Francisco Maldonado da Silva (1592–1639), Argentine physician and religious scholar executed by the Inquisition
- Giancarlo Maldonado (born 1982), Venezuelan football (soccer) player
- Gonzalo Maldonado (disambiguation), several people
- Guillermo Maldonado (pastor), the co-founder of El Rey Jesus
- Guillermo Maldonado (racing driver) (born 1952), Argentine retired racing driver
- Gunner Maldonado, American football player
- Javier Torres Maldonado (born 1968), Mexican / Italian composer
- Jesús E. Maldonado, American geneticist
- Joseph Maldonado-Passage (born 1963), American former zoo operator and convicted felon
- Juan Maldonado
  - Juan Maldonado (humanist) (1485–1554), Spanish humanist and writer of a.o. Somnium
  - Juan de Maldonado y Ordóñez de Villaquirán (1525–1572), Spanish conquistador in Venezuela and Colombia, founder of San Cristóbal, Venezuela
  - Juan de Maldonado (16th century), governor of Cartagena (1554–1555)
  - Juan (de) Maldonado (1533–1583), Spanish Jesuit
  - Juan Villanueva Maldonado (16th century), Spanish conquistador and founder of Macas, Ecuador
  - Juan Álvarez Maldonado (16th century), Spanish conquistador of Peru, who wrote about Paititi
  - Juan Pacheco Maldonado (16th century), Spanish explorer of Morong, Rizal and Maynila, Philippines
  - Juan Maldonado de Villasante (17th century), governor of Costa Rica
  - Juan Manuel Maldonado (19th century), Mexican colonel involved in the foundation of Piedras Negras, Coahuila
  - Juan Maldonado Waswechia Beltran (1857–1901), Mexican indigenous leader of the Yaqui resistance
  - Felix Juan ("Felo") Maldonado (1938–2010), Puerto Rican baseball manager
  - Juan L. Maldonado (1948–2018), administrator of Laredo Community College, Texas
  - Juan Mayr Maldonado (b. 1952), photographer and ambassador of Colombia to Germany
  - Juan Maldonado Jaimez (b. 1982), Brazilian football player
  - Juan Carlos Maldonado (b. 1986), Argentine football player
  - Juan Gabriel Maldonado (b. 1990), Paraguayan football player
- Kirstin Maldonado (born 1992), an American solo singer, also a vocalist of the American a cappella group Pentatonix
- Lourdes Maldonado (born 1973), Spanish journalist
- Lourdes Maldonado López (1954–2022), Mexican journalist
- Luis Albeiro Maldonado Monsalve (born 1958), Colombian Roman Catholic bishop
- María José Maldonado (born 1985), Paraguayan beauty queen and singer
- Maria Maldonado (born 1982), American beauty queen
- Marisol Maldonado (born 1970?), American fashion model, wife of musician Rob Thomas
- Martín Maldonado (born 1986), Puerto Rican professional baseball player
- Miguel Mateo Maldonado y Cabrera (1695–1768), indigenous Zapotec painter in New Spain (now Mexico)
- Mildred Maldonado (born 2001), Mexican rhythmic gymnast
- Nancy L. Maldonado (born 1975), American lawyer
- Norman Maldonado (born 1985), Puerto Rican hematologist, former president of the University of Puerto Rico
- Pastor Maldonado (born 1985), Venezuelan racing driver
- Patricia Maldonado (writer) (born 1956), Argentine-Brazilian writer
- Pedro Vicente Maldonado (1704–1748), Ecuadorian scientist
- Pedro de Jesús Maldonado Lucero (1892-1937), Mexican priest, saint and martyr
- Raul Maldonado (born 1975), Argentine retired football player
- Santiago Maldonado (1989–2017), his death became a political scandal in Argentina
- Theresa A. Maldonado, American electrical engineer and academic administrator
- Tomás Maldonado (1922–2018), Argentine painter, designer, and thinker, Scientific Design movement theorist
- Tomás Maldonado Cera (born 1971), Colombian serial killer
- Víctor Maldonado (born 1939), Venezuelan hurdler
