= Ruiz =

The Spanish and Portuguese surname Ruiz is a patronymic from the personal name Ruy, a short form of Rodrigo, meaning "son of Roderick". Roderick's roots can be traced back to the Visigoths, the Germanic tribe which ruled in the Iberian Peninsula between the 5th and 8th centuries; it originates from the Germanic personal name "Hrodric" which is composed of the elements "Hrōd", meaning "renown", and "rīc", meaning "power(ful)", thus "famous ruler".

== People ==
- Adolfo Ruiz Cortines (1890–1973), President of Mexico 1952–1958
- Alejandro R. Ruiz (1923–2009), U.S. Army recipient of the Medal of Honor in World War II
- Alexandre Ruiz (born 1987), French rugby union referee
- Andrés Ponce 'Andy' Ruiz Jr. (born 1989), American professional boxer of Mexican descent
- Antoñito Ruiz (born 1951), Spanish child actor and stuntman
- Ashley Ruiz (born 1976), American singer, prior member of the group Menudo
- Bartolomé Ruiz (1482–1532), Spanish conquistador
- Bernardo Ruiz (1925–2025), Spanish road bicycle racer
- Bernardo Ruiz (filmmaker), Mexican–American documentary filmmaker
- Blas Ruiz, Spanish explorer
- Brunilda Ruiz (1936–2019), American ballet dancer
- Bryan Ruiz (born 1985), Costa Rican football player
- Carlos Ruiz (disambiguation), several people
- Cesar Ruiz (disambiguation), several people
- Chela Ruiz (1921–1999), Argentine actress
- Chris Ruiz, German electronic DJ and producer, member of band And One
- David Resendez Ruíz (unk) Mexican-American prison activist known for Ruiz v. Estelle
- Edgar Humberto Ruiz (born 1971), Colombian road cyclist
- Emilio Ruiz Muñoz (1874–1936), Spanish priest and press pundit
- Enrique Ruíz-Williams, Cuban exile
- Enzo Ruiz (disambiguation), several people
- Estanislau Ruiz Ponsetti (1889–1967), Spanish engineer and socialist politician
- Estela Ruiz (born 1936), Mexican-American Marian visionary
- Esteury Ruiz (born 1999), Dominican baseball player
- Félix Ruiz (1940–1993), Spanish footballer
- Frankie Ruiz (1958–1998), Puerto Rican salsa singer
- Gabriel Ruiz (disambiguation), several people
- Gabrielle Ruiz (born 1983), American actress
- Gonzalo Ruiz de Toledo, Spanish aristocrat
- Héctor Ruiz (born 1945), Mexican-American businessman, CEO of AMD
- Hipólito Ruiz López (1754–1816), Spanish botanist whose standard author abbreviation is Ruiz
- Iñaki Ruiz de Pinedo (born 1954), Spanish politician
- Israel Ruiz Jr. (born 1943), New York politician
- Iván Ruiz (born 1977), Cuban volleyball player
- Jaime Ruiz (disambiguation), several people
- Jesús Zueco Ruiz (1946–2025), Spanish politician
- John Ruiz a.k.a. "The Quiet Man" (born 1972), Puerto Rican boxing champion
- José Francisco Ruiz (1795–1840), Texas revolutionary and politician
- José Martínez Ruiz, pseudonym Azorin (1873–1967), Spanish poet and writer
- José Javier Pomés Ruiz (born 1952), Spanish politician and Member of the European Parliament
- José Ruiz (baseball) (born 1994), Venezuelan baseball player
- Juan Ruiz (1283–1350), Spanish priest and poet
- Juan Ruiz de Alarcón (1581–1639), dramatist from New Spain
- Katie Ruiz (born 1984), American artist
- Keibert Ruiz (born 1998), Venezuelan baseball player
- Lorenzo Ruiz (c. 1600–1637), Filipino saint
- Marcel Ruiz (footballer) (born 2000), Mexican professional footballer
- Marcel Ruiz (actor) (born 2003), American actor
- Mari-Jo P. Ruiz, Filipina mathematician
- María Lourdes Ruiz (1965–2025), Nicaraguan discus thrower and shot putter
- Maria Luisa Alanis Ruiz (born 1948), American academic and activist
- Martha Cecilia Ruiz (born 1972), Nicaraguan poet, writer, journalist, and activist
- Matías Alonso Ruiz (born 1952), Spanish politician
- Don Miguel Ruiz (born 1952), Mexican author, shaman, and teacher of the Toltec tradition
- Norge Ruiz (born 1994), Cuban baseball player
- Óscar Ruiz (referee) (born 1969), Colombian football referee
- Pablo Ruiz y Picasso (1881–1973), Spanish artist
- Raúl Ruiz (disambiguation), several people
- Renata Ruiz (born 1984), Chilean model, 2005 Miss Universe contestant
- Renato Ruiz (born 1977), Mexican professional wrestler
- Richard Ruiz, Mexican football player
- Rio Ruiz (born 1994), American professional baseball player
- Rocío Ruiz (born 1990), Spanish footballer
- Rodrigo Ruiz (born 1972), Chilean football player
- Rosie Ruiz (1953–2019), woman who cheated at the 1980 Boston Marathon
- Samuel Ruiz (1924–2011), Mexican bishop from the state of Chiapas
- Tracie Ruiz (born 1963), American synchronized swimmer
- Vincenzo Arangio-Ruiz (1884–1964), Italian politician

== Places ==
- Nevado del Ruiz, volcano in Colombia
- Ruiz, Nayarit, in Mexico
