= Benitez =

Benítez (Spanish: [beˈniteθ], in Latin America: [beˈnites]; meaning "son of Benito") is a surname of Spanish origin. It is thought to have originated in Asturias, in the north of Spain.

== Geographical distribution ==
As of 2014, 23.6% of all known bearers of the surname Benítez were residents of Paraguay (1:37), 19.2% of Argentina (1:266), 16.3% of Mexico (1:910), 7.2% of Colombia (1:793), 6.4% of Spain (1:864), 4.5% of the United States (1:9,485), 3.6% of Venezuela (1:1,009), 3.4% of Honduras (1:306), 3.4% of the Philippines (1:3,520), 3.3% of Cuba (1:422), 2.4% of El Salvador (1:312) and 1.3% of Ecuador (1:1,424).

In Spain, the frequency of the surname was higher than national average (1:864) in the following autonomous communities:

1. Ceuta (1:305)
2. Andalusia (1:322)
3. Canary Islands (1:350)
4. Extremadura (1:378)

In Paraguay, the frequency of the surname was higher than national average (1:37) in the following departments:

1. Caazapá (1:22)
2. Guairá (1:25)
3. Itapúa (1:28)
4. Caaguazú (1:33)
5. Canindeyú (1:33)
6. Misiones (1:34)
7. San Pedro (1:35)
8. Alto Paraguay (1:35)
9. Amambay (1:35)
10. Alto Paraná (1:36)

== Argentina ==
- Andrea Benítez (tennis) (born 1986), Argentine professional tennis player.
- Jorge José Benítez (born 1950), Argentine professional football player and coach.
- Leandro Benítez (born 1981), Argentine professional football player.
- Jonathan Benítez (born 1991), Argentine football player.
- Javier Benítez (born 1976), Argentine former athlete.
- Oliver Benítez (born 1991), Argentine professional football player.
- Walter Benítez (born 1993), Argentine professional football player.

== Colombia ==
- Helena Benítez de Zapata (1915–2009), songwriter, politician, teacher, and journalist.
- Hernando Urriago Benítez (born 1974), poet and essayist.

== Cuba ==
- Antonio Benítez-Rojo (1931–2005), Cuban-American professor.

== Dominican Republic ==
- Armando Benítez (1972–), Dominican professional baseball player.

== Ecuador ==
- Christian Benítez (also known as Chucho Benítez) (1986–2013), Ecuadorian professional football player.

== Mexico ==
- Elsa Benítez (born 1977), Mexican supermodel.
- Erika Benítez, Mexican astronomer

== Paraguay ==
- Alcides Benítez (born 2002), Paraguayan footballer
- Arsenio Benítez (born 1971), Paraguayan professional football player
- Mario Abdo Benítez (born 1971), Paraguayan politician and served of president of Paraguay
- Delfín Benítez Cáceres (1910–2004), Paraguayan professional football player
- Gustavo Benítez (born 1953), Paraguayan professional football player
- José de La Cruz Benítez (born 1952), Paraguayan professional football player
- Justo Pastor Benítez (1897–1963), Paraguayan historian and politician
- Miguel Ángel Benítez Pavón (born 1970), Paraguayan professional football player
- Pedro Benítez (footballer, born 1901), Paraguayan professional football player
- Pedro Benítez (footballer, born 1981), Paraguayan professional football player
- Silvio Benítez (born 1935), former Paraguayan soccer and basketball player and coach
- Pedro Benítez Bernal (born 1957), Paraguayanlaw, ex magistrado

== Philippines ==
- Albee Benitez, Filipino businessman and politician
- Daniel Zildjian Benitez, Filipino musician
- Paz Márquez-Benítez (1894–1983), Filipina short-story writer.

== Puerto Rico ==
- Alejandrina Benítez de Gautier (1819–1879), Puerto Rican poet.
- Eddie Benitez (born 1962), Puerto Rican jazz musician.
- Félix Benítez (1886–1975), Puerto Rican architect of the Normandie Hotel in San Juan, Puerto Rico.
- Jaime Benítez (1908–2001), Puerto Rican author, academic, and politician.
- José Benítez (1848–1880), Puerto Rican poet of the Romanticism Era.
- Lucecita Benítez (Luz Esther Benítez) (born 1942), Puerto Rican singer.
- María Benítez (1783–1873), Puerto Rican poet and playwright.

== Spain ==
- Andrea Benítez (born 1994), Spanish skateboarder
- Antonio Benítez (1951–2014), Spanish footballer
- Dani Benítez (born 1987), Spanish footballer
- Juan Manuel Benitez (born 1974), reporter and host of NY1 Noticias, a 24-hour local news Spanish-language station in New York City
- El Cordobés (Manuel Benítez Pérez) (born 1936), Spanish matador
- Rafael Benítez (born 1960), Spanish football player and manager

== United States ==
- Gio Benitez, journalist.
- Jazmin Benitez, American professional wrestler known by her ring names Mercedes Martinez and Retaliation
- Joe Benitez (born 1971), American comic book artist.
- John Benitez (better known as Jellybean Benitez) (born 1957), American musician, DJ, and music producer.
- Roger Benitez (born 1950), American federal judge.
- Wilfred Benítez (born 1958), American world champion professional boxer.

== Uruguay ==
- Ademar Benítez (born 1956), Uruguayan former football striker.
- Otto Benítez, Uruguayan chess master

== Venezuela ==
- Héctor Benítez (1918–2011), Venezuelan professional baseball player.

== See also ==
- Hector Benitez (disambiguation)
- Casas de Benítez, municipality in Cuenca, Castile-La Mancha, Spain.
- Arturo Merino Benítez International Airport serving Santiago, Chile.
- United States v. Dominguez Benitez, 2004 US Supreme Court decision on the Federal Rules of Criminal Procedure.
