= Juan Maldonado =

Juan (de) Maldonado may refer to:

- Juan Maldonado (humanist) (1485–1554), Spanish humanist and writer of a.o. Somnium
- Juan Maldonado (fl. 1536–1572, captain in the army of Gonzalo Jiménez de Quesada involved in the Spanish conquest of the Muisca, co-founder of Simití, Bolívar; see List of conquistadors in Colombia
- Juan de Maldonado (governor of Cartagena), Spanish governor of Cartagena, 1554–1555; see List of governors of the Province of Cartagena
- Juan Maldonado (conquistador, born 1525) (1525–1572), Spanish conquistador in Venezuela and Colombia, founder of San Cristóbal, Venezuela
- Juan Maldonado (Jesuit) (1533–1583), Spanish Jesuit
- Juan Villanueva Maldonado, 16th-century Spanish conquistador and founder of Macas, Ecuador
- Juan Álvarez Maldonado, 16th-century Spanish conquistador of Peru, who wrote about Paititi
- Juan Pacheco Maldonado, 16th-century Spanish explorer of Morong, Rizal and Maynila, Philippines
- Juan Maldonado de Villasante, 17th-century Spanish governor of Costa Rica
- Juan Manuel Maldonado, 19th-century Mexican colonel involved in the foundation of Piedras Negras, Coahuila
- Tetabiate (Juan Maldonado Waswechia Beltran, 1857–1901), Mexican indigenous leader of the Yaqui resistance
- Félix Maldonado (Felix Juan Maldonado, 1938–2010), Puerto Rican baseball manager
- Juan L. Maldonado (born 1948), president of Laredo Community College, Texas
- Juan Mayr (Juan Mayr Maldonado, born 1952), photographer and ambassador of Colombia to Germany
- Juan Maldonado Jaimez (born 1982), Brazilian footballer
- Juan Maldonado (footballer, born 1986), Argentinian footballer
- Juan Maldonado (footballer, born 1990), Paraguayan footballer
- Estadio Juan Maldonado Gamarra, football stadium in Peru

== See also ==
- Juana de la Concepción (Juana de Maldonado y Paz, 1598–1566), Guatemalan nun and poet
