= Parow =

Parow can mean:

== Places ==
- Parow, Germany, a village in Mecklenburg-Vorpommern, Germany
- Parow, Cape Town, a northern suburb of Cape Town, Western Cape, South Africa
  - For Captain Johann Heinrich Ferdinand Parow, founder of Parow, Cape Town
- Parow Park, sports venue in Cape Town, South Africa

== People ==
- Jack Parow (born 1982), stage name of Zander Tyler, South African rapper

== See also ==
- Paro (disambiguation)
- Para (disambiguation)
- Parra (disambiguation)
