= List of most common surnames in Oceanian countries =

This article contains lists of the most common surnames in some of the countries of Oceania. Countries are arranged in alphabetical order.

== Australia ==
Statistics are drawn from Australian government records of 2007, however they may have changed.

No.	Name	Number of people	Origin
1	Smith	114,997	English
2	Jones	55,679	Welsh
3	Williams	55,555	Welsh
4	Brown	54,896	Scottish
5	Wilson	46,961	Scottish
6	Taylor	45,328	English
7	Johnson	33,435	English
8	White	31,099	English
9	Martin	31,058	English, French
10	Singh	30,911	Punjabi
11	Thompson	29,931	English, Scottish
12	Nguyen	29,798	Vietnamese
13	Turner	27,276	English
14	Walker	26,688	English
15	Harris	26,025	English
16	Lee	25,612	Chinese, English, Korean
17	Ryan	25,526	Irish
18	Robinson	25,168	English
19	Kelly	25,014	Irish
20	Murphy	24,993	Irish

== Fiji ==
Statistics are based on the genealogy resources and vital statistics in Fiji during 2014.

No.	Name	Origin
1	Kumar	Indian
2	Prasad	Indian
3	Chand	Indian
4	Singh	Indian
5	Lal	Indian
6	Sharma	Indian
7	Narayan	Indian
8	Khan	Indian
9	Ali	Indian
10	Devi	Indian
11	Ram	Indian
12	Naidu	Indian
13	Chandra	Indian
14	Nand	Indian
15	Lata	Indian
16	Deo	Indian
17	Reddy	Indian
18	Prakash	Indian
19	Raj	Indian
20	Maharaj	Indian
21	Waqa	Na vosa vaka-Viti
22	Goundar	Indian

== New Zealand ==
Statistics are based on births registered in New Zealand during 2021.

No.	Name	Origin
1	Singh	Punjabi
2	Smith	English
3	Kaur	Punjabi
4	Williams	Welsh
5	Patel	Gujarati
6	Wilson	Scottish
7	Brown	Scottish
8	Taylor	English
9	Jones	Welsh
10	Sharma	Indian

== See also ==
- List of family name affixes
- List of most popular given names
- Lists of most common surnames, for other continents
