= Ibáñez =

Ibáñez may refer to:

- Ibáñez (surname)
- Ibanez, a Japanese guitar brand

== Places ==
- Ibáñez River, Aisén region, Chile
- Río Ibáñez, Chile, a commune in the Aisén region named after the river
- Adolfo Ibáñez University, Chile
- Alonso de Ibáñez Province, Bolivia
- Andrés Ibáñez Province, Bolivia
- Casas-Ibáñez, a town in Albacete, Spain
- Villa Ibáñez, seat of Ullúm Department, Argentina
