= Saez =

Saez and its variants, the accented Sáez, Sàez and Saéz may refer to:

== People ==
=== Sportspeople ===
- Daniel Sáez (disambiguation), multiple people
- Esteban Sáez, Chilean football player
- Gabriel Saez, Panamanian horse racing jockey
- Iñaki Sáez, Spanish footballer
- Iolanda García Sàez, Spanish ski mountaineer
- José Saez, French football player
- Marc Gasol Sáez, better known as Marc Gasol, Spanish professional NBA basketball player
- Osleidys Menéndez Sáez, Cuban athlete in the javelin throw
- Osvaldo Sáez, Chilean football player
- Pau Gasol Sáez, better known as Pau Gasol, Spanish professional NBA basketball player
- Sebastián Sáez, Argentine football player

=== Other people ===
- Carlos Federico Sáez, Uruguayan artist
- Damien Saez, known mononymously as Saez, French singer-songwriter
- Diana V. Sáez, Puerto Rican conductor, composer, and pianist
- Emmanuel Saez, French economist
- Francisco de Paula Martínez y Sáez (1835–1908), Spanish zoologist
- Irene Sáez, Venezuelan politician, former Miss Universe
- José Castillo (Spanish Civil War), full name José del Castillo Sáez de Tejada (1901–1936), police lieutenant during the Second Spanish Republic
- María Sáez de Vernet (1800–1858), Argentine writer
- Piru Sáez, Argentine actor and rock singer
- Raúl Sáez (1913-1992), Chilean engineer
- Sheldry Sáez, Panamanian model and beauty pageant competitor

== Other ==
- Ministro Pistarini International Airport, whose ICAO notation is SAEZ
