= Cárdenas =

Cárdenas or Cardenas may refer to:

== People ==
- Cárdenas (surname)

== Places ==
=== Cuba ===
- Cárdenas, Cuba
- Bay of Cárdenas

=== Mexico ===
- Cárdenas, San Luis Potosí
- Cárdenas, Tabasco
- Lázaro Cárdenas, Michoacán
- Lázaro Cárdenas, Quintana Roo

=== Nicaragua ===
- Cárdenas, Rivas

=== Panama ===
- Cárdenas, Panama

=== Spain ===
- Cárdenas, La Rioja

=== Venezuela ===
- Cárdenas Municipality, Táchira, a municipality in Táchira, Venezuela

== Companies ==
- Cardenas (supermarket), a supermarket chain in the United States
