= Panama City Panama Temple =

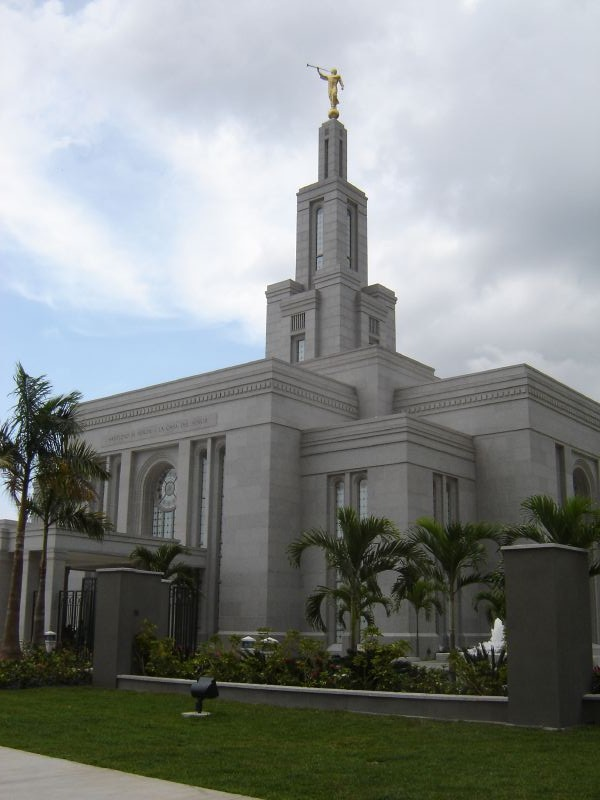
- Interactive map of Panama City Panama Temple
- Number: 127
- Dedication: 10 August 2008, by Thomas S. Monson
- Site: 6.96 acres (2.82 ha)
- Floor area: 18,943 ft^{2} (1,759.9 m^{2})
- Height: 111 ft (34 m)
- Official website • News & images

Church chronology
← Curitiba Brazil Temple	Panama City Panama Temple	→ Twin Falls Idaho Temple

Additional information
- Announced: 23 August 2002, by Gordon B. Hinckley
- Groundbreaking: 30 October 2005, by Spencer V. Jones
- Open house: 11-26 July 2008
- Current president: Roberto Muñoz
- Designed by: Mallol & Mallol and Naylor W. Lund
- Location: Ancón, Panama
- Coordinates: 8°59′28.18319″N 79°34′12.41400″W
- Exterior finish: China stone
- Design: Classic modern, single spire design
- Baptistries: 1
- Ordinance rooms: 2 (two-stage progressive)
- Sealing rooms: 2
- Notes: Temple dedicated on 10 August 2008 following an open house from 11 July to 26 July 2008. First temple dedicated in Panama.

The Panama City Panama Temple is a temple of the Church of Jesus Christ of Latter-day Saints in Cárdenas, a suburb of Panama City, Panama. The intent to build the temple was announced by the First Presidency on August 23, 2002, in a letter to local church leaders. It is the first in Panama, the third in Central America, and the church's 127th operating temple worldwide. The temple has a single central spire with a statue of the angel Moroni on its top, and the exterior is China stone with art-glass windows. It was designed by the architectural firm Mallol & Mallol of Panama City and Naylor Wentworth Lund of Salt Lake City. A groundbreaking ceremony, to signify the beginning of construction, was held on October 20, 2005, conducted by Spencer V. Jones, a general authority and president of the church's Central America Area. The temple is on 6.96 acres lot on a hillside overlooking the Panama Canal. After construction was completed, Nearly 33,000 people visited the temple during its public open house, which received front-page coverage in Panama's largest newspaper. The temple was dedicated on August 10, 2008, by church president Thomas S. Monson.

== History ==
The church's first congregation in Panama was organized in 1941. The Panama City Panama Temple was announced on August 23, 2002, by the church's First Presidency, in a letter to local church. It was announced simultaneously with a temple in Curitiba, Brazil. The announcement was made approximately one and a half years after church president Gordon B. Hinckley visited Panama City in December 2000, where he spoke to a congregation of 5,000 members at a convention center, and he told members that the church would find a way to build a temple in Panama if they faithfully paid their tithing and kept the commandments. He noted that the temple's cost would far exceed their tithing contributions.

On October 20, 2005, a groundbreaking ceremony was held for the temple, with Spencer V. Jones, president of the Central America Area, presiding. Hurricane Beta was over the coasts of Panama and Costa Rica the day before the groundbreaking, but the storm moved north, providing clear skies for the ceremony.

Construction proceeded on a 6.96-acre site in Cárdenas, a suburb of Panama City, on a tree-covered hillside overlooking the Panama Canal and the North Pacific Ocean. The temple was built adjacent to the Cárdenas Ward meetinghouse, which was extensively remodeled during the temple's construction. On May 4, 2007, a statue of the angel Moroni was placed on top of the temple's spire.

After construction was completed, a public open house was held from July 11 to July 26, 2008, excluding Sundays. Nearly 33,000 people toured the temple during this period, with approximately 5,000 visiting during the first two days and roughly 10,000 during the final two days. The open house received media attention, including a front-page story in Panama's largest newspaper, La Prensa. A radio commentator told his audience that visiting the temple would be a once-in-a-lifetime experience. Among the distinguished visitors was Panama's First Lady, Vivian Fernández de Torrijos, who toured the temple with Don R. Clarke, then serving as president of the Central America Area.

On August 9, 2008, a cultural celebration was held at the Figali Convention Center in Amador. Approximately 1,000 youth performed folk and cultural dances, including cumbias, salsas, and the conga. One group of youth from the remote San Blas Islands traveled three days to participate in the event. Church president Thomas S. Monson attended the celebration and told attendees it was his first visit to Panama.

The Panama City Panama Temple was dedicated on August 10, 2008, by Monson in four sessions The dedicatory sessions were broadcast to all stake centers in Panama. The dedication began with a ceremony where children from the congregation joining Monson in sealing the cornerstone. Richard G. Scott, of the Quorum of the Twelve Apostles and members of the area presidency also participated in the dedication. Prior to the temple's completion, members in Panama traveled to Costa Rica to attend the temple in San José.

The day after the dedication, Monson and other church leaders met with Panamanian President Martín Torrijos and his wife, Vivian Fernández de Torrijos. President Torrijos expressed gratitude for humanitarian efforts by the church in Panama, including wheelchair distribution, vaccine initiatives, and literacy programs. Monson presented the Torrijos family with a sculpture depicting a child's first steps.

== Design and architecture ==
The temple is on a 6.96-acre plot on a tree-covered hillside overlooking the Panama Canal and the North Pacific Ocean. The landscaping, designed by SolMar, has palm trees, foliage, and a water feature. Adjacent to the temple is a meetinghouse, and a facility at the rear of the property provides housing for the temple's presidency, missionaries, and patrons. The temple's location makes it visible to travelers from the Panama Canal and across the surrounding area.

The temple was designed by the architectural firm Mallol & Mallol of Panama City and Naylor Wentworth Lund of Salt Lake City, with construction done by Diaz and Guardia Panama. It is 111 feet tall and is 18,943 square feet. The exterior walls are China stone with art-glass windows.

The temple has two ordinance rooms, two sealing rooms, and a baptistry. The interior includes original murals created for the temple by local artist Linda Christiansen. The wooden doors and decorations are made from Panama mahogany, while the floors and countertops throughout the temple are made with Spanish stone. A wood inlay design of the Peristeria elata flower, Panama's national flower, exists on a chair in the bride's room.

== Temple leadership and admittance ==
The church's temples are directed by a temple president and matron, each typically serving for a term of three years. The president and matron oversee the administration of temple operations and provide guidance and training for both temple patrons and staff. As of 2025, Roberto M. Ortega is the president, with Raquel V. Cárdenas de Muñoz serving as matron.

=== Admittance ===
Following completion of construction, a public open house was held from July 11 to July 26, 2008, excluding Sundays. Like all the church's temples, it is not used for Sunday worship services. To members of the church, temples are regarded as sacred houses of the Lord. Once dedicated, only church members with a current temple recommend can enter for worship.

== See also ==

Temples in Central America
= Operating
= Under construction
= Announced
= Temporarily Closed

- The Church of Jesus Christ of Latter-day Saints in Panama
- Comparison of temples of The Church of Jesus Christ of Latter-day Saints
- List of temples of The Church of Jesus Christ of Latter-day Saints
- List of temples of The Church of Jesus Christ of Latter-day Saints by geographic region
- Temple architecture (Latter-day Saints)
