= Jara =

Jara or JARA may refer to:

== Places ==
- Jara, Ethiopia, administrative center of Gololcha woreda
- Jara (Asunción), Paraguay, a barrio (neighborhood) of Asunción
- Jara, Kutch, Gujarat, India, a village
- Jara Lake, Bolivia
- Jara, a tributary of the Șușița in Romania
- Jara (Šventoji), a tributary of the Šventoji in Lithuania

== People ==
- Diarra, French spelling of the West African clan name, originally Jara
- Jara (surname), a list of people with the surname

== Other uses ==
- Jara (beehive)
- Jara language, a Nigerian language
- Jarāmaraṇa (Jarā) (Pali), often translated as "aging," a fundamental aspect of the Buddhist notion of suffering
- Japan Robot Association, a Japanese trade association made up of companies in the robotics industry
- Jara High School, West Bengal, India
- Jára Cimrman, a fictitious Czech polymath
- Jara, in Hindu literature, an asuri in the story of Jarasandha

== See also ==
- La Jara (disambiguation)
- Jara Saguier, a list of brothers with the surname
- Jarra (disambiguation)
- Jarah, a minor Biblical figure
