= Juan Gabriel (disambiguation) =

Juan Gabriel (1950–2016) was a Mexican singer and songwriter.

Juan Gabriel may also refer to:

- Juan Gabriel (album), the 29th studio album by Juan Gabriel

== People ==
- Juan Gabriel Concepción (b. 1972), Spanish pole vaulter
- Juan Gabriel Maldonado (b. 1990), Paraguayan footballer
- Juan Gabriel Patiño (b. 1989), Paraguayan footballer
- Juan Gabriel Rivas (b. 1992), Argentine footballer
- Juan Gabriel Uribe Vegalara, Colombian politician and journalist
- Juan Gabriel Valdés (b. 1947), Chilean political scientist
- Juan Gabriel Vásquez (b. 1973), Colombian writer
- Juan Gabriel of Teruel, 16th-century Spanish translator known for translating the Quran into Latin
