= Aravena =

Aravena is a surname that may refer to:

- Alejandro Aravena, (born 1967), Chilean architect
- Boris Aravena (born 1982), Chilean footballer
- Claudia Aravena (born 1968), Chilean artist, filmmaker, and professor
- Jorge Aravena (born 1969), Peruvian-Venezuelan actor
- Jorge Orlando Aravena Plaza (born 1958), Chilean footballer
- Manuel Aravena (born 1954), Chilean cyclist
- Mario Aravena (born 1985), Chilean footballer
- Orlando Aravena (born 1942), Chilean footballer and manager
- Víctor Aravena (born 1990), Chilean athlete
