= Vera (surname) =

Vera is an Italian and Spanish surname. Notable persons with that surname include:

- Alejo Vera (1834–1923), Spanish painter
- Alfredo Vera Vera (1910–1999), Ecuadorian politician
- Alfonso Vera (born 1974), Mexican radio and television host
- America Vera Zavala (born 1976), Romanian-born Swedish politician and political writer
- Anastacio Vera (born 1985), Paraguayan footballer
- Ángel Herrera Vera (born 1957), Cuban boxer
- Antonio Vera (born 1986), Spanish footballer
- Arturo Vera (born 1946), Argentine politician
- Augusto Vera (1813–1885), Italian philosopher
- Bernard Vera (born 1950), French politician
- Billy Vera (born 1944), American singer, actor, writer and music historian
- Brandon Vera (born 1977), Filipino-American professional mixed martial artist
- Brian Vera (born 1981), Mexican-American boxer
- Carlos Vera (born 1976), Ecuadorian football referee
- Carolina Vera (born 1962), Argentine meteorologist
- Cris de Vera (1924–1975), Filipino actor
- Cristobal de Vera (1577–1621), Spanish painter
- Dan Vera (first published 2004), Cuban-American poet and editor
- Daniel Bazán Vera (born 1973), Argentine footballer
- Danny Vera (singer) (born 1977), Dutch singer-songwriter
- Danny Vera (footballer) (born 1980), Ecuadorian footballer
- Diego Vera (born 1985), Uruguayan footballer
- Emmanuelle Vera (born 1994), Filipino-American singer-songwriter
- Enrique Vera (born 1979), Paraguayan footballer
- Enrique Vera Ibáñez, (born 1954), Mexican race walker
- Enzo Vera (born 1983), Chilean footballer
- Eusebio Guilarte Vera (1805–1849), Bolivian politician
- Francisco Vera Cabeza de Vaca (1637–1700), Spanish portrait painter
- Fredy Vera (born 1986), Paraguayan footballer
- Gerardo Vera (1947–2020), Spanish costume and set designer, actor and director
- Helio Vera (1946–2008), Paraguayan writer, lawyer and journalist
- Ignacio Loyola Vera (born 1954), Mexican politician
- Jacinto Vera (1813–1881), Uruguayan Roman Catholic bishop
- Jaime Vera (born 1963), Chilean footballer and manager
- JC de Vera (born 1986), Filipino actor and model
- Jenaro Gajardo Vera (1919–1998), Chilean lawyer, painter and poet
- Jesús Vera (born 1989), Argentine footballer
- Joey Vera (born 1963), American heavy metal bassist
- Jorge Gutiérrez Vera (first employed 1966), Mexican electrical engineer
- José de Azlor y Virto de Vera (c. 1677–1734), Spanish colonial governor
- José de Jesús Vera (born 1969), Venezuelan footballer
- José Raúl Vera López (born 1945), Mexican Roman Catholic bishop
- José Santos González Vera (1897–1970), Chilean writer
- Juan de Vera (1453–1507), Spanish Roman Catholic cardinal
- Lissa Vera (born 1982), Argentine singer-songwriter, composer and actress
- Luciano Vera (born 2002), Argentine footballer
- Luis Vera (Chilean footballer) (1929–2014), Chilean footballer
- Luis Vera (Venezuelan footballer) (born 1973), Venezuelan footballer
- Luis R. Vera (born 1952), Chilean film director, producer, writer and academic
- Luis Santana Vera (born 1991), Ecuadorian footballer
- María Teresa Vera (1895–1965), Cuban singer-songwriter
- Mariano Vera (1780–1840), Argentine politician
- Marlon Vera (born 1992), Ecuadorian mixed martial artist
- Norge Luis Vera (born 1971), Cuban baseball pitcher
- Oscar Luis Vera (born 1976), Argentine footballer
- Pedro Jorge Vera (1914–1999), Ecuadorian writer and politician
- Pedro González Vera (born 1967), Chilean footballer
- Pedro Vera (Paraguayan footballer) (born 1984), Paraguayan footballer
- Pedro Vera (Venezuelan footballer) (born 1958), Venezuelan football manager and former player
- Peter Vera (born 1982), Uruguayan footballer
- Ricardo Vera (born 1962), Uruguayan long-distance runner
- Roberto Martínez Vera-Tudela (born 1967), Peruvian football manager
- Rolando Vera (athlete), (born 1965), Ecuadorian long-distance runner
- Rolando Vera (wrestler) (1915–2001), Mexican professional wrestler
- Rosa Vera, Mexican 1992 Summer Paralympics athlete
- Santiago de Vera, Spanish colonial governor of the Philippines starting 1584
- Santiago Vera-Rivera (born 1950), Chilean composer, teacher and musical researcher
- Saro Vera (1922–2000), Paraguayan religious leader
- Susej Vera (born 1976), Venezuelan actress and model
- Urko Vera (born 1987), Spanish footballer
- Veronica Vera (photographed by Mapplethorpe in 1982), American sexuality writer and actress
- Yvonne Vera (1964–2005), Zimbabwean writer

== See also ==
- Vera (given name)
- Vera (disambiguation)
