= Carlos Ruiz =

Carlos Ruiz may refer to:

== Academics ==
- Carlos Ruiz Encina (b. 1964), Chilean sociologist and political activist
- Carlos Ruiz Fuller (1916–1997), Chilean geologist and mining engineer

== Authors and journalists ==
- Carlos Ruiz Chapellín (1865–1912), Venezuelan showman
- Carlos Ruiz Apezteguia (1930–1995), Paraguayan journalist and entrepreneur
- Carlos Ruiz-Tagle (1932–1991), Chilean writer
- Carlos Ruiz Zafón (1964–2020), Spanish novelist

== Government and politics ==
- Carlos Ruiz Bahamonde (1880–1940), Chilean politician

== Sports ==
- Carlos Ruiz (sailor) (born 1940), Salvadoran Olympic sailor
- Carlos Ruíz (volleyball) (born 1957), Cuban volleyball player
- Carlos Ruiz (Argentine footballer) (born 1971), Argentine footballer
- Carlos Ruiz (Guatemalan footballer) (born 1979), Guatemalan footballer
- Carlos Ruiz (baseball) (born 1979), Panamanian baseball player
- Carlos Ruiz (footballer, born 1983), Spanish footballer
- Carlos Ruiz (Peruvian footballer) (born 2002), Peruvian footballer

== Military ==
- Carlos A. Ruiz, Sergeant Major of the United States Marine Corps

== See also ==
- Carlos Ruiz peleando con un cochero (1897), Venezuelan film
- Carl Ruiz (1975–2019), judge on the American elimination cooking game show Guy's Grocery Games
