= Gabriel Ruiz =

Gabriel Ruiz may refer to:

- Gabriel Ruiz (songwriter) (1908–1999), Mexican songwriter
- Gabriel Ruiz (footballer) (born 1980), Argentine footballer
