= Soria (disambiguation) =

Soria is a city in north-central Spain.

Soria may also refer to:

- Soria (province), a province of central Spain
- 9th Infantry Regiment “Soria”, a Spanish regiment named after the city.
- Soria (grape), another name for the Italian wine grape Ansonica
- Cross Internacional de Soria, annual cross country running competition in Spain
- The Declaration of Soria Moria, 2005 Norwegian political accord
- Soria Moria Castle, Norwegian fairy tale

== People ==
- Alberto Soria (1906–1980), Peruvian footballer
- Alex Soria (1966–2004), Canadian rock and roll musician
- Arturo Soria y Mata (1844–1920), Spanish urbanist
- Carmelo Soria (1921–1976), Chilean diplomat
- Carlos Soria (born 1949), Argentine politician
- Carlos Soria Fontán (born 1939), Spanish mountaineer
- Cecilia Soria (born c. 1991), Argentinian politician
- David Soria Yoshinari (born 1977), Peruvian footballer
- Dorle Soria (1900–2002), publicist and record producer
- Eleazar Soria (1948–2021), Peruvian footballer
- Francisco Martínez Soria (1902–1982), Spanish actor
- Gabriel Soria (1908–1971), Mexican film director
- Giovanni Battista Soria (1581–1651), Italian architect
- Javi Soria (born 1984), Spanish footballer
- Javier Soria (born 1974), Peruvian footballer
- Joakim Soria (born 1984), Mexican professional baseball player
- Joaquín Soria Terrazas (1909–1990), Mexican President of CONCACAF
- José Manuel Soria (born 1958), Spanish academic and politician
- Karen Soria, Australian rabbi
- Lorenzo Soria (1951–2020), Argentine-born Italian studio executive
- Mauricio Soria (born 1966), Bolivian footballer
- Miguel-Angel Soria, Mexican-American activist
- Miguel Ángel Soria (born 1974), Spanish footballer
- Mireille Soria (born 1970), producer at FilmWorks
- Paulino Martínez Soria (born 1973), Spanish footballer
- Ramón Soria (born 1989), Spanish footballer
- Rodrigo Soria (born 1987), Argentine footballer
- Rubén Soria (1935–2020), Uruguayan footballer
- Sebastián Soria (born 1983), Uruguayan footballer
- Sixto Soria (born 1954), Cuban boxer
- Vladimir Soria (born 1964), Bolivian footballer
- Xavier Soria (born 1972), Andorran footballer
