= La Jara =

La Jara may refer to:

- La Jara, Colorado, United States, a statutory town
- La Jara, New Mexico, United States, a census-designated place
- La Jara (comarca), Spain
- La Jara Reservoir, in Conejos County, Colorado, United States
