= Donoso =

Donoso is a surname. Notable people with the surname include:

- Álex Anwandter Donoso (born 1983), Chilean singer-songwriter
- Catalina Parot Donoso (born 1956), Chilean lawyer
- Claudia Ulloa Donoso (born 1979), Peruvian writer
- Claudio Donoso (died 2021), Chilean forester
- Gabriel Donoso (1960–2006), Chilean polo player
- Guille Donoso (born 1995), Spanish footballer
- Humberto Donoso (1938–2000), Chilean footballer
- José Donoso (1924–1996), Chilean writer
- José Jiménez Donoso (c. 1632–1690), Spanish architect and painter
- Juan Donoso Cortés (1809–1853), Spanish author, conservative, Catholic political theorist and diplomat
- Juan de la Cruz Donoso (1805–1859), Chilean politician and journalist
- Lino Donoso (1922–1990), Cuban baseball player
- Luis Cruz Donoso
- Luz Donoso (1921–2008), Chilean graphic artist, muralist, political activist, and teacher
- Manuel Donoso (1936–2026), Chilean Roman Catholic archbishop
- Marcela Donoso (born 1961), Chilean painter
- Matías Donoso (born 1986), Chilean footballer
- Mauricio Donoso (born 1976), Chilean footballer
- Mauro Donoso (born 1971), Chilean footballer
- Miguel Donoso Pareja (1931–2015), Ecuadorian writer
- Pablo Donoso (born 1984), Chilean racing driver
- Pedro Donoso Velasco (1944–2001), Chilean chess master
- Roberto Donoso-Barros (1921–1975), Chilean herpetologist
- Ruperto Donoso (1914–2001), Chilean-born American jockey
