= Hector Benitez (disambiguation) =

Hector Benitez may refer to:

- Héctor Benítez (1918–2011), Venezuelan professional baseball player
- Héctor Darío Benítez (born 1980), Paraguayan professional footballer

== See also ==
- Benitez
