= The Church of Jesus Christ of Latter-day Saints in Panama =

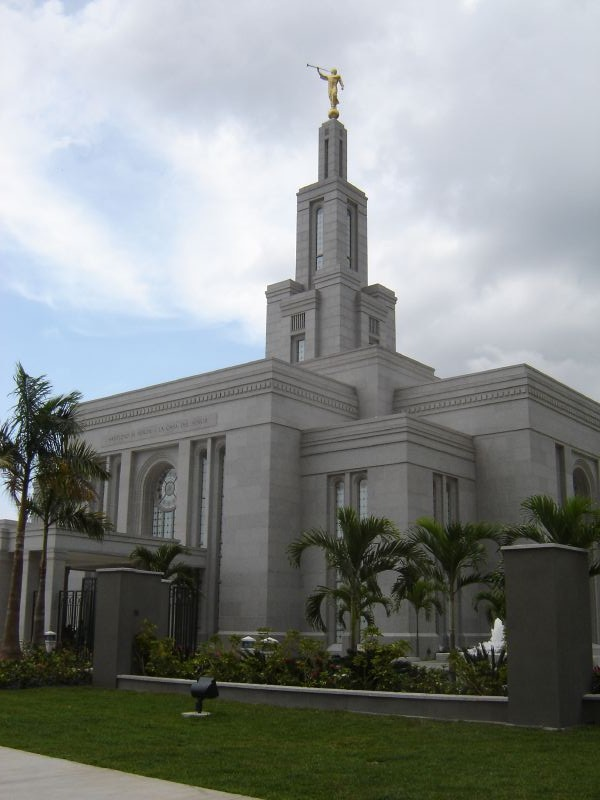
- The Panamá City Panamá Temple
- Area: Central America
- Members: 63,936 (2026)
- Stakes: 7
- Districts: 4
- Wards: 48
- Branches: 32
- Total Congregations: 80
- Missions: 1
- Temples: 1 operating
- FamilySearch Centers: 28

The Church of Jesus Christ of Latter-day Saints in Panama refers to the Church of Jesus Christ of Latter-day Saints (LDS Church) and its members in Panama. The first branch (small congregation) was formed in 1955. As of December 31, 2025, it had 63,936 members organized in 80 congregations, including 7 stakes, 1 mission, and 1 temple. The church traces its history to a Canal Zone Branch organized in 1941, with formal government recognition granted in 1965.

== History ==
Membership in Panama
Year	Membership
1941*	100
1975	953
1979	2,293
1989*	15,000
1999	35,257
2009	43,703
2019	59,526
2025	63,936
*Membership was published as an estimated number. Source: Wendall J. Ashton; Jim M. Wall, Deseret News, various years, Church Almanac Country Information: Panama

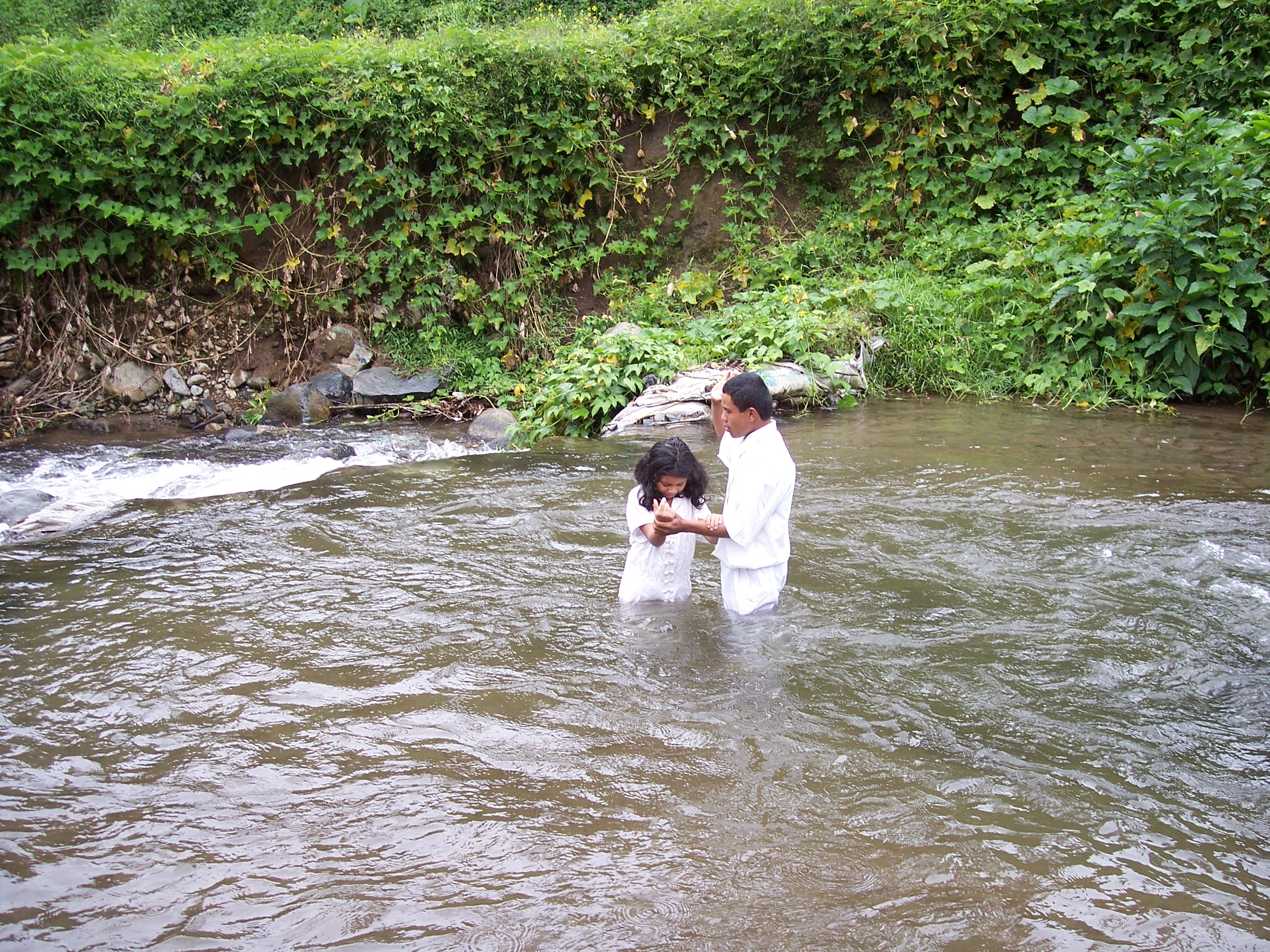
Baptism of an eight year old in Cerro Punta, Panama.

Early missionary efforts among the Guna people (formerly known as Cuna) of the San Blas Islands (now Guna Yala) began in the mid-1960s. On February 4, 1966, twelve young men were baptized on Carti Tupile.

A brief history can be found at LDS Newsroom (Panama) or Deseret News 2010 Church Almanac (Panama)

=== Authorization ===
In 1940, the first members of The Church of Jesus Christ of Latter-day Saints to come to Panama, included soldiers and families who came to settle in the military bases established by the United States. Following this, the small community created started holding Sunday meetings, giving rise to the need of a branch of an LDS church.

Otto Hunsaker was the person who wrote to the First Presidency in 1941 requesting them to authorize the creation of a branch. He put in the formal request twice. On May 18, 1941, Elder Antoine R. Ivins, a general authority of the Church, was authorized to organize the first branch.

== Stakes and Districts ==
As of July 2026, Panama had the following stakes and districts:

Stake/District	Organized
Arraiján Panamá Stake	12 Mar 2006
Changuinola Panamá District	23 Apr 1995
Chitré Panamá District	1 Oct 1980
Colón Panamá Stake	5 Nov 1995
Concepción Panamá District	7 Jun 1998
David Panamá Stake	19 Apr 1987
Guna Yala Panamá District	1 Jun 1979
La Chorrera Panamá Stake	23 Jul 1989
Panamá City Stake	11 Nov 1979
San Miguelito Panamá Stake	20 Apr 1986
Tocumen Panamá Stake	17 May 1998

== Missions ==
The Panamá Panamá City Mission was organized July 1, 1988 and is the only mission in Panama.

== Temples ==
The Panama City Panama temple was announced by the LDS Church on August 23, 2002. Ground was broken by Spencer V. Jones, a General Authority Seventy of the LDS Church, on October 30, 2005, three years after its announcement. The open house for the temple was held from July 11 to July 26, 2008, with the temple being dedicated in four sessions by church president Thomas S. Monson on August 10, 2008.

127. Panama City Panama Temple; Official website; News & images	
Location: Announced: Groundbreaking: Dedicated: Size: Style: Notes:	Ancón, Panama; 23 August 2002 by Gordon B. Hinckley; 30 October 2005 by Spencer V. Jones; 10 August 2008 by Thomas S. Monson; 18,943 sq ft (1,759.9 m^{2}) on a 6.96-acre (2.82 ha) site Classic modern, single spire design - designed by Mallol & Mallol and Naylor W. Lund; Temple dedicated on 10 August 2008 following an open house from 11 July to 26 July 2008. First temple dedicated in Panama.

== See also ==
- Religion in Panama
