= Lists of most common surnames =

Most populous family names by continent

Lists of the most common surnames by continent:

- List of most common surnames in African countries
- List of most common surnames in Asian countries
- List of most common surnames in European countries
- List of most common surnames in North American countries
- List of most common surnames in Oceanian countries
- List of most common surnames in South American countries

== See also ==
- List of family name affixes
- List of most popular given names
- List (surname)
