= Carlos Ruiz-Tagle =

Chilean writer

- Born: February 12, 1932; Santiago de Chile, Chile
- Died: 1991; Santiago de Chile
- Occupations: Writer, Novelist, Historical compilator, Antologator
- Writing career
- Period: Los libros Memorias de pantalón corto, 1954 – Los antifrívolos (postumal piece), 1992.
- Genre: Fictional story
- Notable work: La edad del pavo
- Literary movement: Real Academia Española

Carlos Ruiz-Tagle (born February 12, 1932 – died September 22, 1991, né Carlos Ruiz-Tagle Gandarillas) was a Chilean writer.

== Life ==
Ruiz-Tagle was born in Santiago, Chile, to father Carlos Ruiz-Tagle Vicuña and mother Elena Gandarillas Rooms. He attended primary and secondary education at Saint George's School in Santiago and later studied agronomical engineering at the Catholic University of Chile.
