= Raúl Ruiz =

Raúl Ruiz or Raul Ruiz may refer to:

- Raúl Ruiz (director) (1941–2011), Chilean filmmaker
- Raul Ruiz (journalist) (1940–2019), American journalist and Chicano activist
- Raul Ruiz (politician) (born 1972), United States congressman
- Raúl Ruiz (footballer) (born 1990), Spanish footballer
