= Luz Donoso =

Chilean graphic artist

- Born: Luz Donoso Puelma; 1921; Santiago, Chile
- Died: January 18, 2008 (aged 86–87)

Luz Donoso Puelma (born 1921 in Santiago, Chile, died January 18, 2008), also known as Luz Donoso, was a Chilean graphic artist, muralist, political activist, and teacher. Beginning in the mid 1960s, Donoso was one of the most prominent participants in the muralist movement that supported Salvador Allende’s presidential campaign. In the first months of the dictatorship she was dismissed from her teaching position at the University of Chile, like many of her colleagues, and shortly after co-founded an artist run work space and forum, Taller de Artes Visuales (TAV).

== Selected exhibitions ==
- 1976 – Instituto Chileno Frances, Santiago
- 1977 – Cuatro Grabadores Chilenos, Galleria Cromo, Santiago
- 1978 – Participated in the collective Exposition "Recreando a Goya" at the Goethe institute, Santiago Chile.
- 1983 – Chilenas en Berlin, Berlin
- 1987 – Mujer, Arte y Perferia, floating Curatorial Gallery, Women in Focus, Vancouver
- 2011 - Una Accion hecha por otro es una obra de la Luz Donoso, Centro de Arte Contemporaneo de Las Condes, Santiago
- 2012 – Her work was featured in a Collective exposition organized by The Red Conceptualismos de Sur "Perder la forma humana. Una imagen sismica de los anos ochenta en America Latina" at the Museo Nacional Centro de Arte Reina Sofía in Madrid.
- 2015 – Her work was featured in a collective exposition "Ausencia encarnada, Efimeralidad y collectividad en el art chileno en los anos setenta" curated by Liz Munsell at the Museo de la Solidaridad Salvador Allende, Santiago, Chile.
- 2016 – Her work was featured in a collective exposition "Poner el cuerpo. Llamamientos de arte y politica en los anos ochenta en America Latina" curated by Javier Manzi y Paulina Varas at the Museo de la Solidaridad Salvador Allende, Santiago, Chile.
- 2017 – Radical Women: Latin American Art, 1960–1985
