= Kluivert =

Kluivert may refer to:

- Kenneth Kluivert (born 1941), Surinamese former footballer, father of below-mentioned Patrick
  - Patrick Kluivert (born 1976), Dutch football coach and former footballer, father of below-mentioned Justin, Ruben and Shane
    - Justin Kluivert (born 1999), Dutch footballer, son of above-mentioned Patrick
    - Ruben Kluivert (born 2001), Dutch footballer, son of above-mentioned Patrick
    - Shane Kluivert (born 2007), Dutch footballer, son of above-mentioned Patrick
