= Carolina Vera =

Argentine meteorologist

Carolina Susana Vera
- Born: 14 July 1962 (age 64); San Nicolás de los Arroyos, Buenos Aires Province, Argentina
- Education: University of Buenos Aires
- Occupation: Meteorologist

Carolina Susana Vera (born 14 July 1962) is an Argentinian meteorologist. She is the principal investigator of the Argentinian research council National Scientific and Technical Research Council (CONICET), and a professor at the Faculty of Exact and Natural Sciences at the University of Buenos Aires (UBA). Her research focuses on climate variability and global warming in South America.

Since 10 December 2019, Vera is part of the Argentinian Ministry of Science, Technology and Innovation. She is vice president of the working group I of the UN's IPCC program, a member of the United Nations Environment Program (UNEP) and the World Meteorological Organization (WMO).

== Early life ==
Vera was born July 14, 1962, in San Nicolás de los Arroyos, Argentina. She began developing an interest in meteorology at a young age, fascinated with the stormy clouds in the sky. Her mother had an impact on her decision to pursue meteorology. Vera said, “Unlike other people, my mom was very observant. She observed plants, animals, and especially the sky. She always looked up when the clouds were approaching, [or] when some conditions changed. I kept that spinning around in my head until I sat down in high school to decide what I was going to study in college.” According to Vera, her mother used to predict the weather based on whether or not she could hear a distant train.

== Education ==
Vera graduated with a degree in Meteorological Sciences from the School of Natural and Applied Sciences of the University of Buenos Aires in 1986. Following this, she completed her doctorate in the department of Atmospheric Sciences at the same university under the direction of Dr. Eugenia Kalnay. She graduated in 1992 with a thesis entitled "A Data Assimilation System for the Extratropical Region of South America."

== Career ==
She began her teaching career as a teaching assistant in 1984. Following, she worked as a practical applications teacher from 1991 to 1994, as adjunct faculty between 1994 and 2011. From 2011 to 2012 she worked as an associate professor and became a professor at the beginning of 2012.

In 2014, Vera gave a TED Talk as part of TEDxRiodelaPlata in Buenos Aires, Argentina. Her presentation primarily focused on a research project conducted to confirm the existence of a jet stream that runs through eastern Argentina.

Vera considers it a duty to share her findings on social media. She frequently posts weather updates and research on climate change on X. Commenting on the value of social media, Vera said "I am concerned about the communication of scientific knowledge to reach people… Twitter gives us the possibility to do it directly. While the area of climate was always more exposed in the media by daily forecasts, other areas of science were less used to interacting with people. Today social media helps us. I consider communicating in them what I research as something more of my work. In fact, one researcher said that we should spend 20% of our time doing that. Why? Because today you can't do science if you don't explain to the world what you're doing it for. It is our responsibility."

== Advocacy for Women in STEM ==
Vera has been an advocate for women in STEM ever since her thesis advisor led her to become a feminist. Vera reveres her thesis supervisor, Dr. Kalnay, and said the following about her: “My thesis supervisor, Eugenia Kalnay, made me a feminist. Until I stopped interacting with her, she was not aware of gender differences. She was my mentor, it was to see the reference of where one could go, even being a woman.”

Vera had several poor experiences as a woman in STEM, citing many meetings in which she was the only woman. On one occasion, a male colleague even told her not to discuss scientific matters at such meetings in order to avoid contradicting him in public. Having endured such sexism, Vera has developed enough power and confidence as a woman in the STEM field and encourages other women to do the same. She has said, “I have been very fortunate to meet amazing women trying to make progress in science. It has been easy for me to encourage and empower them in their career, just by explicitly recognizing their excellent skills and aptitudes.”

== Awards ==
- Platinum Konex Award granted by Konex Fundation for her work in the last decade (2023).
- Recognition as "Outstanding Personality of the University of Buenos Aires" (2021), during their bicentennial celebration, 8 also receiving a personalized medal, a coin minted by the Casa de la Moneda and a postage stamp of the Argentine Mail (specially made for the occasion)
- Cleveland Abbe Award from the American Meteorological Society (August 2019)
- 2012 “Emilio Caimi” Award to Scientific Trajectory, Centro Argentino de Meteorólogos.

== Participation in International Panels and Committees ==
- 1997-2002 Member of "Variability of American Monsoon Systems" (VAMOS) Scientific Panel of World Climate Research Program (WCRP)
- 2002-2004 ViceChair of WCRP/VAMOS Scientific Panel
- 2004-2006 Co-Chair of WCRP/VAMOS Scientific Panel
- 2001-2005 Chair of the WCRP/CLIVAR/South American Low-Level Jet Scientific Working Group
- 2004-2006 Chair of the STAC Committee on Southern Hemisphere Meteorology and Oceanography of the American Meteorological Society (AMS).
- 2006 Co-Chair of the 8th AMS 8th International Conference on Southern Hemisphere Meteorology and Oceanography of the American Meteorological Society. Foz do Iguacú, 24–28 April 2006.
- 2007-2012 Officer Member of the Joint Scientific Committee of the World Climate Research Program (WCRP) sponsored by WMO, ICSU and IOC.
- 2007-2015 Member of the Scientific Advisory Committee (SAC) of the Inter-American Institute for Global Change Research (IAI).
- 2009-2011 Lead Author of the IPCC Special Report on "Managing the Risks of Extreme Events and Disasters to Advance Climate Change Adaptation" (SREX).
- 2011–Present Member of the International Advisory Board of the Center for Development Research (ZEF)/University of Bonn.
- 2011 Member of the Scientific Committee of WCRP Open Science Conference, Denver 24–28 October 2011. 18 December 2017 3
- 2013-2017 Member of Future Earth Science Committee.
- 2014-2016 Ex-Officio Member of Independent Science Panel of CGIAR International Program on Climate Change, Agriculture and Food Security (CCAFS)
- 2014-2016 Member of the Scientific Committee of the Transformations to Sustainability Program of the International Social Science Council (ISSC).
- 2014-2015 Member of the Scientific Committee of "Our Common Future under Climate Change " International Conference, 7–10 July 2015, Paris, France.
- 2015 Member of the Steering Scientific Committee of the "IPCC Workshop on Regional Climate Projections and their Use in Impacts and Risk Analysis Studies", São José dos Campos, Brazil, 15–18 September 2015.
- 2015–Present Vice-Chair of WG1 and member of the Bureau of the IPCC. 2017–Present Member of WMO/CAS Management Group
