= La Jara Reservoir =

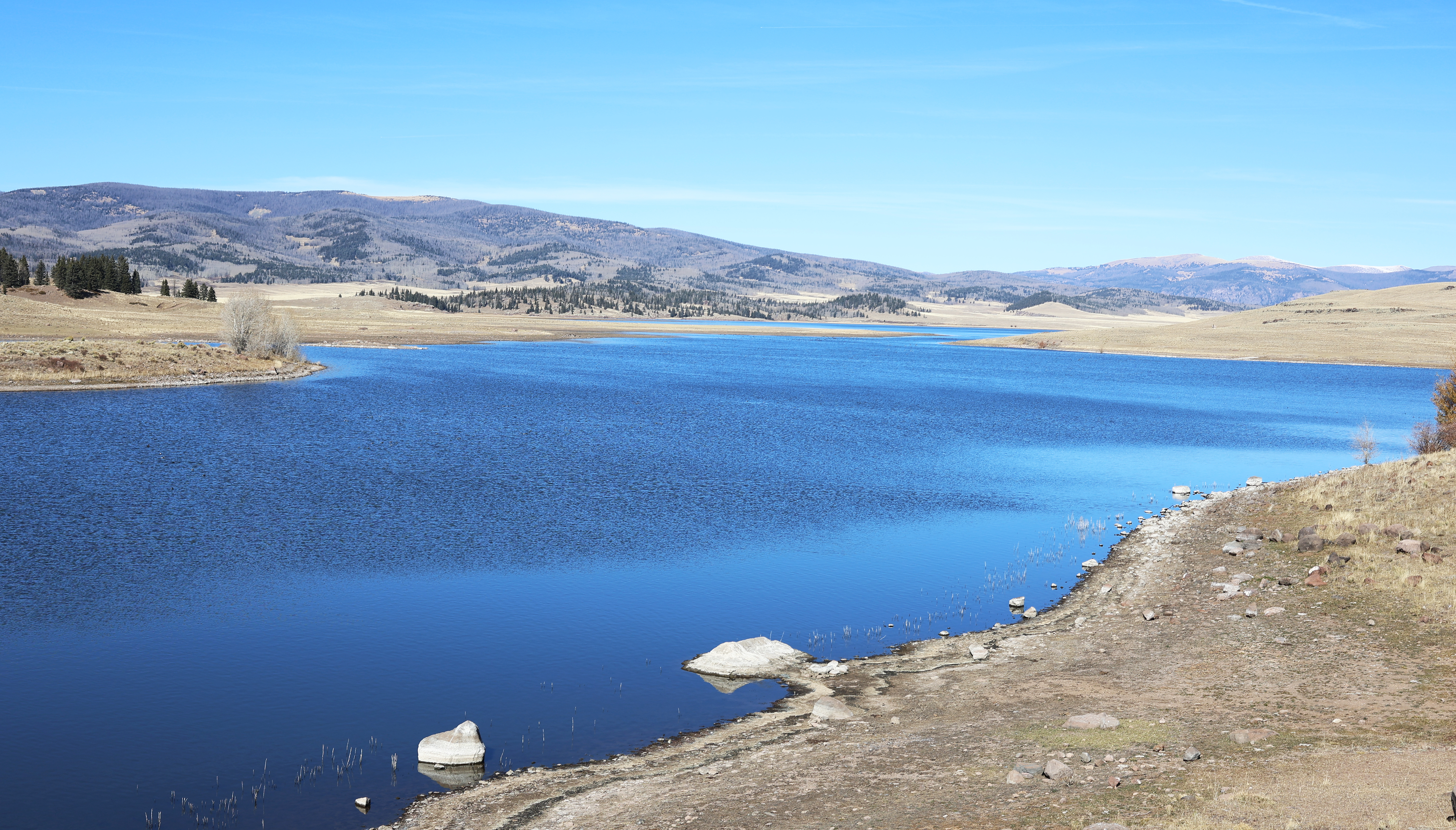
- The reservoir in 2023

- The reservoir's location in Colorado
- Location: Conejos County, Colorado
- Coordinates: 37°14′2.87″N 106°21′11.88″W
- Type: reservoir
- Primary inflows: Jim Creek, Torsido Creek, La Jara Creek
- Primary outflows: La Jara Creek
- Basin countries: United States
- Managing agency: Colorado Parks and Wildlife
- Built: 1906
- Surface area: 1,241 acres (502 ha)
- Water volume: 14,055 acre-feet (17,337,000 cubic meters)
- Surface elevation: 9,705 feet (2,958 m)
- Frozen: Freezes in winter

La Jara Reservoir is a reservoir in Conejos County, Colorado. Located 24 miles (39 kilometers) west of the town of La Jara, Colorado, the reservoir lies high in the San Juan Mountains. The rocky dirt road to the reservoir is difficult, and the reservoir lies about 15 miles (24 kilometers) from the nearest paved road. The fishing is poor, but the area surrounding the reservoir is popular with deer, elk, and waterfowl hunters.

== Dams ==
Water in the reservoir is impounded by two dams, with a natural hill separating the two. The dams, called La Jara Dam no. 1 and La Jara Dam no. 2, have NID IDs CO00814 and CO02873 and are earthen dams. They were built in 1906. The reservoir can store up to 14,055 acre-feet (17,337,000 cubic meters) of water. Dam no. 1 is 48 feet (15 meters) high and 510 feet (160 meters) wide. Dam no. 2 is 24 feet (7.3 meters) high and 730 feet (220 meters) wide.

== Land tenure ==
The two dams and the reservoir are managed by Colorado Parks and Wildlife. The reservoir and the land surrounding it are state trust land owned by the State of Colorado. Portions of the reservoir and the land surrounding it make up the La Jara Reservoir State Wildlife Area, managed by Colorado Parks and Wildlife.

The Colorado State Land Board, the agency that manages Colorado State Trust lands, is considering transferring the 45,650-acre (18,470-hectare) tract of land that makes up the La Jara State Trust Land to the Rio Grande National Forest, which is adjacent to the property. The tract includes the reservoir.

An appraisal completed in October 2023 by Chandler Consulting of Grand Junction, Colorado set the value of the tract at $43.5 million. The final sum will be paid by the federal government agencies acquiring the land (Forest Service, Bureau of Land Management) to the Colorado State Land Board. The price works out to about $1,000 per acre ($2,500/ha).

In June 2025, a news report indicated that the land transfer from the Colorado State Land Board would be divided among the United States Forest Service, the Bureau of Land Management, and Colorado Parks and Wildlife, with the western 21,821.28 acres (8,830.76 hectares) of the 45,000-acre (18,000-hectare) tract going to the Forest Service, the eastern 21,704.51 acres (8,783.50 hectares) going to the Bureau of Land Management, and the 2,124 acres (860 hectares) surrounding the reservoir going to Colorado Parks and Wildlife. The two federal agencies accrued funds in the years prior to the land transfer with monies from the federal Land and Water Conservation Fund, a fund Congress established in 1964.
