= Waqa =

Waqa may refer to:

- Barina Waqa, Nauruan lawyer and civil servant
- Baron Waqa (b. 1959), Nauruan politician
- Saula Waqa, Fijian footballer
- Sisa Waqa, Fijian rugby league footballer
- Stanley Waqa, Fijian rugby league footballer
- WAQA-LP, American radio station
