= Erika Benítez =

Mexican astronomer

Erika María Benítez Lizaola is a Mexican astronomer whose research involves blazars and active galactic nuclei. She is a professor in the Faculty of Sciences at the National Autonomous University of Mexico (UNAM) and a researcher in the UNAM Institute of Astronomy.

== Education and career ==
Benítez studied physics as an undergraduate at UNAM, and continued at UNAM for doctoral study in astronomy, completing her Ph.D. in 1997. Her dissertation, Estudios de Variabilidad de Núcleos Activos de Galaxias, reported the discovery of the host galaxy for blazar OJ 287.

She has worked as a researcher at the UNAM Institute of Astronomy since 1997.

== Recognition ==
Benítez is a member of the Mexican Academy of Sciences.
