= María Benítez =

American dancer, choreographer and director (1942–2024)

- Born: María Woesha Díaz; April 14, 1942; Cass Lake, Minnesota, U.S.
- Died: September 2, 2024 (aged 82); Santa Fe, New Mexico, U.S.
- Occupations: Dancer, choreographer
- Known for: Founder of Teatro Flamenco
- Spouse: Cecilio Benítez (died 2014)
- Children: 1

María Woesha Benítez (née Díaz; April 14, 1942 – September 3, 2024) was an American dancer, choreographer, and director in Spanish dance and flamenco. Benítez is best known for the work of the company she and her husband Cecilio founded and directed, Teatro Flamenco.

== Early career ==
Benítez was born in Cass Lake, Minnesota on April 14, 1942, to Geraldine Decoteau, of Chippewa, Algonquin, Oneida, and Iroquois parentage and a Puerto Rican father, Josue Díaz. After initial ballet training in the U.S., Benítez traveled to Spain to study and perform. Her basic training was with Mercedes and Albano and Victoria Eugenia in Madrid. During her tenure abroad she performed in Spain, North Africa, Portugal and South America. She also performed on Spanish television. After returning to the U.S., Maria and her husband Cecilio established homes in New York and Santa Fe. In 1972, she and Cecilio founded their own Flamenco group.

== Choreography for opera ==
Benítez regularly performed in and choreographed for opera. Her first opera experience was performing and choreographing The Santa Fe Opera production of La Vida Breve. With the Metropolitan Opera of New York, she choreographed their production of Carmen in 1987; La Forza del Destino (directed by Giancarlo del Monaco) in 1996; in 1996 the Met's new production of Carmen (directed by Franco Zeffirelli) and in 1998 the Met's new production of La Traviata also directed by Franco Zeffirelli. The Met's Carmen was televised by PBS's Great Performances in the spring of 1997 and Benítez performed in this production in 1997 and 1998 in New York. She has also choreographed and/or performed with other opera companies, such as the Boston Lyric, Virginia, St. Louis and Austin opera companies and in 1997 choreographed and performed in the Santa Fe Opera production of La Traviata. As a solo artist, Benítez has performed with the Orchestra of Santa Fe, the New Mexico and Milwaukee Symphony Orchestras.

== Additional appearances ==
Benítez was featured nationally in her choreography of El amor brujo on PBS's "Evening at POPS" with the Boston POPS, the Los Angeles Guitar Quartet and mezzo-soprano Denyce Graves. Benítez reunited with Graves at the Dallas Opera, choreographing and performing in El amor brujo and La vida breve by Spanish composer Manuel de Falla. Benitez has also performed at numerous dance festivals, such as the American Dance Festival and Jacob's Pillow.

== Institute for Spanish Arts ==
Maria Benítez was Director of the Institute for Spanish Arts which she founded in 1970 along with husband, Cecilio Benítez. The Institute, located in Santa Fe, New Mexico, is a not-for-profit, educational and cultural organization established to present programs of the artistic heritage of Spain. The institute's mission is to preserve, strengthen and disseminate the rich and artistic Spanish heritage as expressed through music, dance, visual arts and other art forms. Projects include adult and children's Spanish arts workshops and Flamenco's Next Generation Estampa Española performances.

== Death ==
Benítez died in Santa Fe on September 3, 2024, at the age of 82.

== Awards and recognitions ==
- New Mexico Governor's Award for Excellence in the Field of Dance
- The City of Santa Fe Mayor's Arts Award
- The Classical Spanish Dance Award from the Institute of Puerto Rico in New York City
- Nominated for the National Medal of Arts, supported by a joint resolution of the New Mexico House and Senate.
- El Real Orden de Isabel la Católico, 2006, conferred on behalf of Spain's King Juan Carlos by Spanish Consulate General Julio Montesinos. The award, named for Queen Isabella of Castille, is Spain's highest artistic honor.
- Santa Fe Living Treasure, 2014.
- 2020 New Mexico Book Awards, Best Biography, Fringe: María Benítez's Flamenco Enchantment, by Jaima Chevalier, Atomic City Lights Publishers, 2019.
