= Katie Ruiz =

American painter (born 1984)

Katie Ruiz (born 1984) is a Chicana painter, sculptor, and activist born in Los Angeles, California but now resides in San Diego, California. She uses her art to depict natural forces and symbolism found in blankets.

== Biography ==
Katie Ruiz was born in Los Angeles, California in 1984 and was raised both there and in Northern Arizona. Raised by her mother alongside her younger sister, Ruiz was also influenced by her grandmother and uncle. She has traveled through twenty two countries and this has influenced her work with Latin American textiles. Katie has also moved twenty times and twice during the pandemic. She moved to San Diego in 2017 and currently still resides there. Ruiz received her bachelor's degree from Northern Arizona University and also pursued a masters degree from the New York Studio school in 2015. After this, she pursued artwork in a variety of ways and now also teaches art at the New York Studio School and Athenaeum School. She also received the Mac Connor Scholarship from LCU in 2014 and the Hohenburg Travel Scholarship in 2015.

She is known for her "blanket series" in which she incorporates the symbolism of blankets and Latin American textiles into intimate moments. During the pandemic, Katie used the time inside to interact with her artwork differently. Blanketism is a term that was coined for an art movement that involves blanket symbols to signify specific themes and expression. Katie, specifically, uses them to tell stories, special moments as well as to show intimacy. Other than her work with blankets, Katie has completed forty sculptures and paintings. Several of these paintings are being showcased at a group show known as "Staff Picks Exhibition" located at the Oceanside Museum of Art. She also has just recently finished creating a children's book named Brian the Wildflower as well as has made masks for healthcare workers. Katie during the pandemic decided to create several "healing alters" and also used her time to work on the masks for the healthcare workers previously mentioned.

== Solo/Group Art ==
=== Solo ===
- Brian and the Bugs (2021) Mural and Installation, New Children's Museum, San Diego, CA
- Waves of Feminism (2021) Women's Museum of California, San Diego, CA
- San Diego International Airport Exhibit (2021), San Diego, CA
- The PomPom Project (2020) Oceanside Museum of Art, CA
- 1805 Gallery Xicana (2019) curated by Lauren Siry, San Diego, CA
- Mother Rose Cried Many Burdens (2018) Mesa College Art Gallery San Diego, CA
- Artistic Soireé (2017) curated by Brit Magnuson, Los Angeles CA
- Blankets (2015) Thesis Exhibition at New York Studio School of Drawing, Painting and Sculpture, New York, NY

=== Group ===
- Staff Picks (2021) Oceanside Museum of Art, San Diego, CA
- MCASD Museum Auction (2020), San Diego, CA
- Mercedes Matter Award Exhibition (2020) NYC, NY
- Sidewalk Activism (2020) curated by Jim Daichendt, Oceanside Museum of Art, San Diego, California
