= Venegas =

Venegas is a Spanish surname. Notable people with the surname include:

- Andrés Venegas García (1848–1939), Costa Rican politician
- Andrew Venegas Onionz (1970) Uncle,Son Of Victor Hall Of Fame.
- Andrés Venegas García (1848–1939), Costa Rican politician
- Charlie Venegas (born 1967), American speedway rider
- Erika Venegas (born 1988), Mexican footballer
- Francisco Venegas (1525–1595), Spanish painter
- Francisco Eduardo Venegas (born 1998), Mexican footballer
- Francisco Javier Venegas (1754–1838), Spanish military officer and viceroy
- Guillermo Venegas Lloveras (1915–1993), Puerto Rican songwriter
- Juan Evangelista Venegas (1929–1980s), Puerto Rican boxer
- Julieta Venegas (born 1970), Mexican musician and singer
- Karen Paulina Rojo Venegas, alcaldessa of Antofagasta
- Kevin Venegas (born 1989), American soccer player
- Luis Gerardo Venegas (born 1984), Mexican footballer
- Luis Venegas (born 1979), Spanish magazine publisher
- Luis Venegas de Henestrosa (c. 1510–1570), Spanish composer
- María Eugenia Venegas (born 1952), Costa Rican educator, politician, deputy of the Legislative Assembly
- Marco Venegas (born 1962), Swedish politician
- Martin Venegas, Filipino Actor and R&B singer
- Miguel Venegas (1680–1764), Mexican jesuit
- Pascual Venegas Filardo (1911–2003), Venezuelan poet, writer and journalist
- Rosa Venegas, Peruvian politician
- Socorro Venegas (born 1972), Mexican writer
