= Jara (beehive) =

Traditional beehive

A jara is a traditional beehive made from a hollowed log cut in two that has been used since ancient times for domesticating bees in Georgia. Bees build honeycomb in a Jara beehive completely by themselves. Nowadays, Jara beehives are mainly found in Adjara region of western Georgia.

== History and origin of Jara beehive ==
There is no evidence for when exactly Jara appeared in Georgia. However, several local folk tales note that ancient inhabitants found the bees in a tree hollow, and they called this place in the forest ‘the bee tree’. Later, locals realized that the ‘bee trees’ could be replicated. They collected swarms of wild bees and settled them into hollowed wooden logs and then placed them high up in trees to protect them from bears. Such wooden logs were called Jara.

== Jara beehive sites ==
In old times, when daily life of local population was closely tied to the forest, Jara beehives were placed in the middle of the forest high up in a Linden tree to protect the beehives from bears and other wild animals. Jara beehives were also placed on the rocks, on around 1200 meters above sea level since the rocks were the safest place for Jara but the most difficult for harvesting; With the development of agriculture and weakening links with the forest, the locals began placing the Jara beehives in the gardens near their homes. This has enabled them to collect swarms in an easier manner and increase the apiary and its productivity. It is where Jara beehives can be mostly found these days. Beekeepers, living in high Adjarian mountains, protect the Jara beehives from severe winter conditions through placing them in specially built wooden shelters.

== The structure of Jara beehive ==
A Jara is typically crafted from Linden wood (Tilia Caucascica), selected for its lightweight nature and lack of strong odor, which helps in not disturbing the bees. Creating a Jara beehive requires specialized knowledge and skill. The bottom cover is meticulously carved to precisely match the upper cover. The upper cover holds the honeycomb and protects the beehives from damage. Jara beehives are different in length and size ranging from 80 to 120 cm with an outer diameter reaching 40–60 cm while inner diameter is usually 25–35 cm. The Jara beehives are made of 100% wood without using a single nail. A 1 cm beehive entrance is arranged in the lower cover of the Jara. In addition, the upper cover must contain so called a divider, which is usually made of a wooden plank from the roots of a fir tree. The divider also serves as a moth repellent.

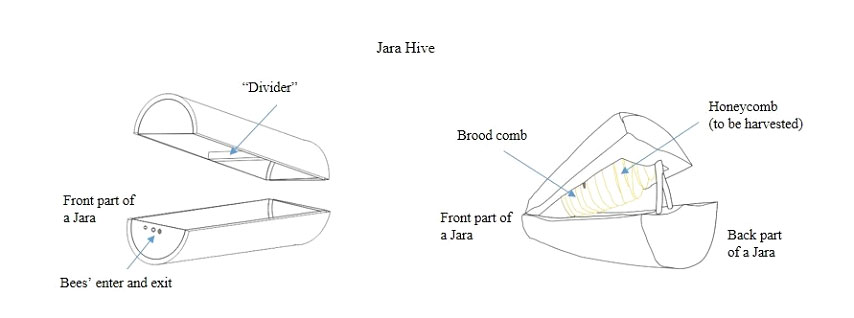

== Harvesting Jara honey ==
Bees build honeycomb in a Jara entirely by themselves. Therefore, the Jara beehive does not contain any artificial wax. The Jara honey is harvested only once a year mainly at the beginning of autumn after the ending of a flowering season. Harvesting honey from the Jara beehive is much more difficult and labor-intensive than from common frame beehives. The process requires special preparation. As a rule, honey from a Jara is harvested by two people. However, additional support is needed for a Jara beehive placed in a tree or on a rock. Beekeepers use special instruments such as oval knives, smokers, ropes, balancers (Kombali), pulleys (Makhara), and branch-ladders (Ghja) for harvesting honey. First, a beekeeper opens and observes the hive inside to understand whether it is possible to harvest honey. If there is enough honey, the beekeeper cuts honeycomb from half of the beehive and does not touch the other half where the bee colony brood is located. Jara honeycomb can be different in color as it contains honey from different plants and flowers such as acacia, chestnut, linden and a vast number of alpine flowers.

== Jara – The monument of intangible cultural heritage of Georgia ==
In 2021 the National Agency for Cultural Heritage Preservation of Georgia granted a status of a monument of intangible cultural heritage of Georgia to honey-making method in Jara beehives.

== Jara beekeeping today ==
Since the 20th century, Jara beehives have been increasingly replaced by modern beehives in Georgia. But there are still few places in Western Georgia, region of Adjara where Jara beehives are still used to make the wild Jara honey

In addition, a documentary called Jara was filmed in 2017 which tells a story of a 1-year journey in wild nature of Adjara featuring Jara beehives and their inhabitant bees.
