= Claudia Aravena =

Chilean visual artist

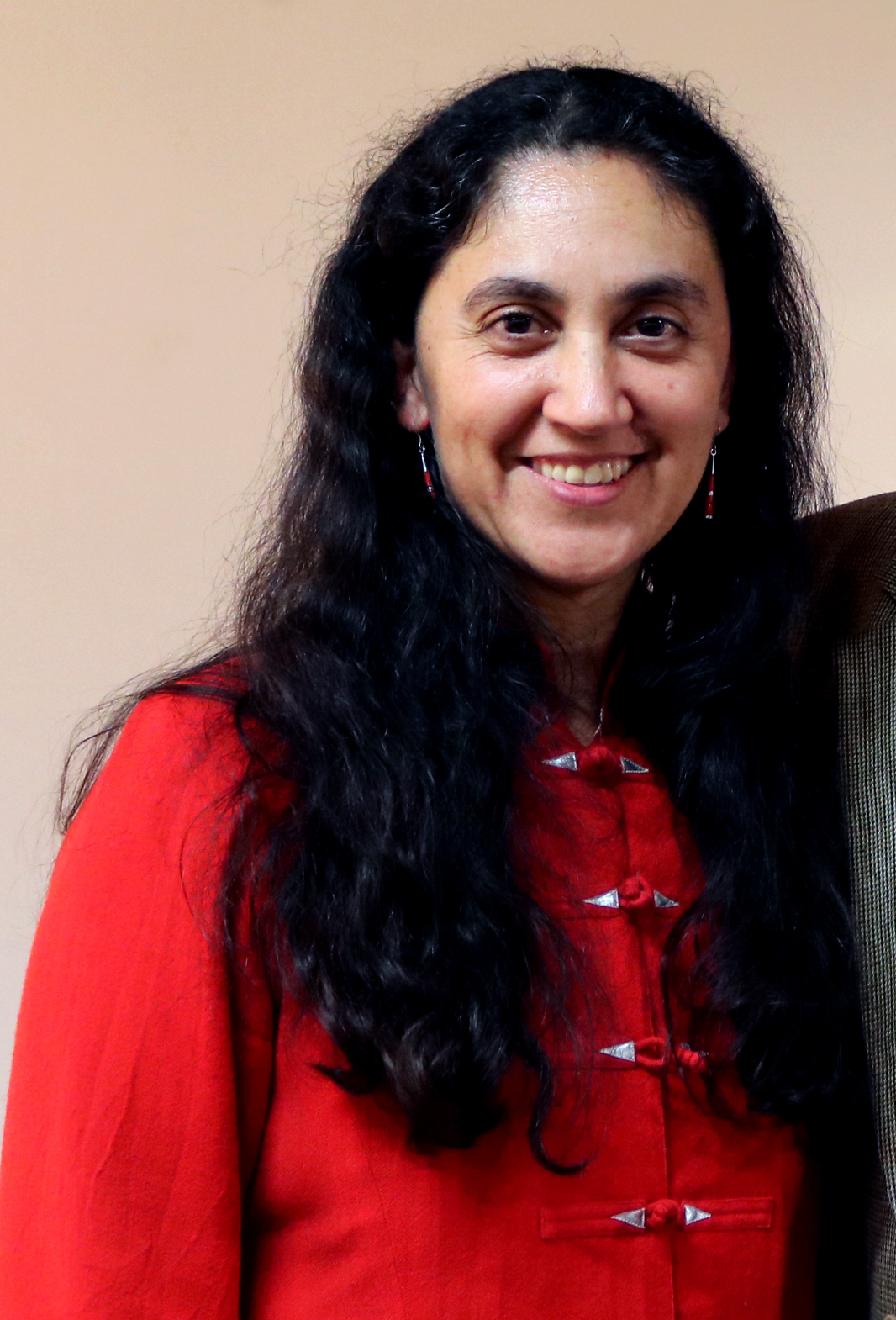
- Born: Claudia Aravena Abughosh; 21 October 1968 (age 57); Santiago, Chile
- Education: University ARCIS
- Occupations: Visual artist, curator, professor
- Notable work: Lugar común
- Awards: Best National Short Film Award for Largadistancia at the Valdivia International Film Festival (1995); First Prize for First Steps at the Locarno VideoArt Festival, Switzerland (1998)
- Website: www.claudiaaravenaabughosh.cl

Claudia Aravena Abughosh (born 21 October 1968) is a Chilean visual artist, curator, short filmmaker, and professor who has worked mainly in the field of contemporary art.

== Life and work ==
Claudia Aravena studied graphic design at University ARCIS, which she later complemented with a degree in audiovisual communication and a master's in cultural studies. Some of her works are framed within urban art and media art through installations, photography, and audiovisual presentations, where the city takes a fundamental role as a central thematic axis, in addition to autobiographical and cultural identity fusion.

== Exhibitions and distinctions ==
Aravena has participated in several solo and group exhibitions during her career, among them the 2009 Havana Biennial, 6th and 7th Video and New Media Santiago Biennial (2007), and the 1st Chilean Triennial (2009) at the Santiago Museum of Contemporary Art, in addition to the shows Handle with Care (2007) at the same institution, La operación verdad, o la verdad de la operación, collective exhibition at the Museo de la Solidaridad Salvador Allende (2010), Circa Berlin at the Nikolaj Contemporary Art Center in Copenhagen (2005), From the Other Site/Side at the Museum of Contemporary Art in Seoul (2006), Video-Forum, NBK at the Museo Rufino Tamayo in Mexico City (2006), among other exhibitions in Chile, Latin America, Europe, and Asia.

In addition, she has participated in several international film festivals, including the International Documentary Film Fest in Paris, the Palermo International Video Art Festival in Italy, the International Documentary Film Festival of Leipzig in Germany, and the 9th International Documentary Film Festival in Lisbon.

In 2002 she received a nomination for the Altazor Award for National Arts in the Installation and Video Art category for Lugar común, in co-authorship with Guillermo Cifuentes.
