= Sanhueza =

Sanhueza is a surname and it may refer to:

- Arturo Sanhueza (born 1979), Chilean footballer
- Eber Sanhueza (born 1998), Chilean rower
- Henry Sanhueza (born 1996), Chilean footballer
- Miguel Sanhueza (born 1991), Chilean footballer
- Nicol Sanhueza (born 1992), Chilean footballer
- Waldo Sanhueza (1900-1966), Chilean footballer and manager
