= Sepulveda =

Sepulveda or Sepúlveda may refer to:

== Places ==
=== United States ===
- Sepulveda Boulevard, a major street in Los Angeles, California
- Sepulveda Dam, a flood control dam in the San Fernando Valley which regulates the Sepulveda Basin
- Sepulveda Pass, a pass over the Santa Monica Mountains connecting the Los Angeles Basin and the San Fernando Valley
- Sepulveda, California, now called North Hills, a neighborhood within Los Angeles.

=== Spain ===
- Sepúlveda, Segovia, a municipality

== People ==
=== California ===
- Sepúlveda family of California
  - Francisco Xavier Sepúlveda (1742–1788), founder of the family
  - Juan Jose Sepúlveda (1764–1808), member of the Ávila family of California
  - Francisco Sepúlveda II (1775–1853), member of the Ávila family of California
  - Juan María Sepúlveda (19th century), noted ranchero
  - Juan Capistrano Sepúlveda (19th century), politician

=== Elsewhere ===
- Alejandra Sepúlveda, Chilean politician
- Ángel Sepúlveda, Mexican footballer
- Bernardo Sepúlveda Amor, Mexican diplomat and jurist
- Daniel Sepulveda, former American football punter
- Eduardo Sepúlveda, Argentine track and road cyclist
- Juan Ginés de Sepúlveda, Spanish theologian and author of the 16th century who wrote in Latin
- Lorenzo de Sepúlveda, 16th-century Spanish author of romances in verse
- Luis Sepúlveda (1949–2020), Chilean writer
- Luis Fernando Sepúlveda, Chilean track and road cyclist
- Luis R. Sepúlveda, American politician
- María Luisa Sepúlveda, Chilean composer
- Sandra Sepúlveda, Colombian footballer
- Sergio Sepúlveda Garcés, Chilean politician
- Sepúlveda Pertence (1937 – 2023), a Brazilian jurist, professor, lawyer, and judge.
