= Xavier Soria =

Andorran footballer

Personal information
- Date of birth: 2 June 1972 (age 54)
- Place of birth: Andorra
- Position: Midfielder

International career
Years	Team	Apps	(Gls)
1999–2002	Andorra	10	(0)

Xavier Soria (born 2 June 1972) is an Andorran football player. He has played for Andorra national team.

== National team statistics ==
Andorra national team
Year	Apps	Goals
1999	1	0
2000	5	0
2001	3	0
2002	1	0
Total	10	0
