= Gonzalo Maldonado =

Gonzalo Maldonado may refer to:

- Gonzalo Maldonado (bishop) (died 1530), Spanish Roman Catholic bishop
- Gonzalo Maldonado (footballer) (born 1994), Peruvian football player
