= Poblete (surname) =

Poblete is a surname. Notable people with the surname include:

- Carlos Poblete, Chilean footballer
- Elizabeth Poblete (born 1987), Chilean weightlifter
- Gerónimo Poblete (born 1993), Argentine footballer
- Israel Poblete (born 1995), Chilean footballer
- Maximiliano Poblete (1873–1946), Chilean politician and physician
- Olga Poblete, Chilean women's rights activist and feminist
- Pascual H. Poblete (1857–1921), Filipino writer and feminist
- Yleem Poblete, U.S. government official
