= Diana V. Sáez =

Diana Victoria Sáez is a Puerto Rican conductor, composer, and pianist. She is most widely known as the founder and artistic director of Coral Cantigas, a Latin American chamber choir active in Washington, D.C., from 1991 to 2016. Sáez is currently Director of Choral Activities in the Department of Music, College of Fine Arts and Communication, Towson University in Baltimore, Maryland.

== Biography ==
A native of Puerto Rico, Sáez earned a Master of Education from Harvard University and a Master of Choral Conducting from Temple University, and she holds a Doctorate in Musical Arts from the University of Maryland, College Park. In October 2003 she was the recipient of the 2003 Tony Taylor Award, presented by the Cultural Alliance of Greater Washington, for her artistic excellence and noticeable assistance to artists in our region. In December 2002 Diana was awarded the Arts in the Community Award for Excellence 2002, by Montgomery County, Maryland Executive Douglas Duncan and Discovery Communications, Inc., for her major contribution to the quality of life in Montgomery County through the arts. In 1999, she received the Poder con Ganas Award from the Hispanic Democratic Club of Montgomery County, in recognition of outstanding and sustained leadership in empowering the Latin American community.

As director of Cantigas, Diana prepared and conducted choirs for the Washington, D.C. premieres of Paco Peña's Misa Flamenca (Spain), Antonio Mir's Misa (Argentina), Luis Morales Bance's oratorio Berruecos (Venezuela), Ernani Aguiar's Cantilena (Brazil) and the anonymous colonial Bolivian-work Misa Encarnación. She has also presented sessions for regional and national conventions of the American Choral Directors Association, and is the ACDA Maryland Repertoire and Standards Chair for Ethnic and Multicultural music. Dr. Sáez frequently serves as guest conductor, clinician, and adjudicator. In addition to her work with Cantigas, Diana previously directed the World Bank-International Monetary Fund Choral Society. She is a founding member of Cantaré, a musical ensemble dedicated to performing music from Latin America for children. Since 2001 Dr. Sáez is a 2001 graduate and roster artist of the Young Audiences / Arts for Learning program of the Teaching Artist Institute, a professional development program for teachers and school administrators who design and implement arts-integrated school curricula, under the auspices of the Maryland State Department of Education and the Maryland State Arts Council. She offers professional development to teachers on incorporating music into their teaching.

=== Coral Cantigas ===
Sáez founded Coral Cantigas in 1991, and served as its artistic director until the chorus ceased operations in 2016.
