= Villalba =

Villalba may refer to:

== People ==
- Darío Villalba (1939-2018), Spanish painter
- Héctor Villalba (born 1994), Argentine footballer who plays for Atlanta United in Major League Soccer
- Jason Villalba, member of the Texas House of Representatives from Dallas
- Luis Héctor Villalba, Argentinian cardinal
- Mercedes Villalba, British politician

== Places ==
Italy

- Villalba, Sicily, a comune in the Province of Caltanissetta

Puerto Rico

- Villalba, Puerto Rico, a municipio in the Commonwealth of Puerto Rico
- Villalba Abajo, a barrio in Puerto Rico
- Villalba Arriba, a barrio in Puerto Rico
- Villalba barrio-pueblo, a downtown and seat in Villalba, Puerto Rico

Spain

- Collado Villalba, a municipio in the Community of Madrid
- Vilalba, a municipio in the Province of Lugo, Galicia
- Villalba de la Loma, a municipio in the Province of Valladolid, Castille and León
- Villalba de los Alcores, a municipio in the Province of Valladolid, Castille and León
- Villalba de los Barros, a municipio in the Province of Badajoz, Extremadura
- Villalba de Rioja, a municipio in the Autonomous Community of La Rioja
- Villalba del Rey, a municipio in the Province of Cuenca, Castile-La Mancha
- Villalbilla, a municipio in the Community of Madrid

Venezuela

- Villalba, Nueva Esparta, a municipio in the State of Nueva Esparta
