= Daniel Sáez =

Daniel Sáez may refer to:

- Daniel Sáez (motorcyclist, born 1985), 125cc World Championship motorcycle racer between 2005 and 2008
- Daniel Sáez (motorcyclist, born 1996), British Motostar Championship competitor
- Daniel Luis Sáez (born 1994), Cuban footballer
