= Cárdenas, La Rioja =

Cárdenas
- Municipality
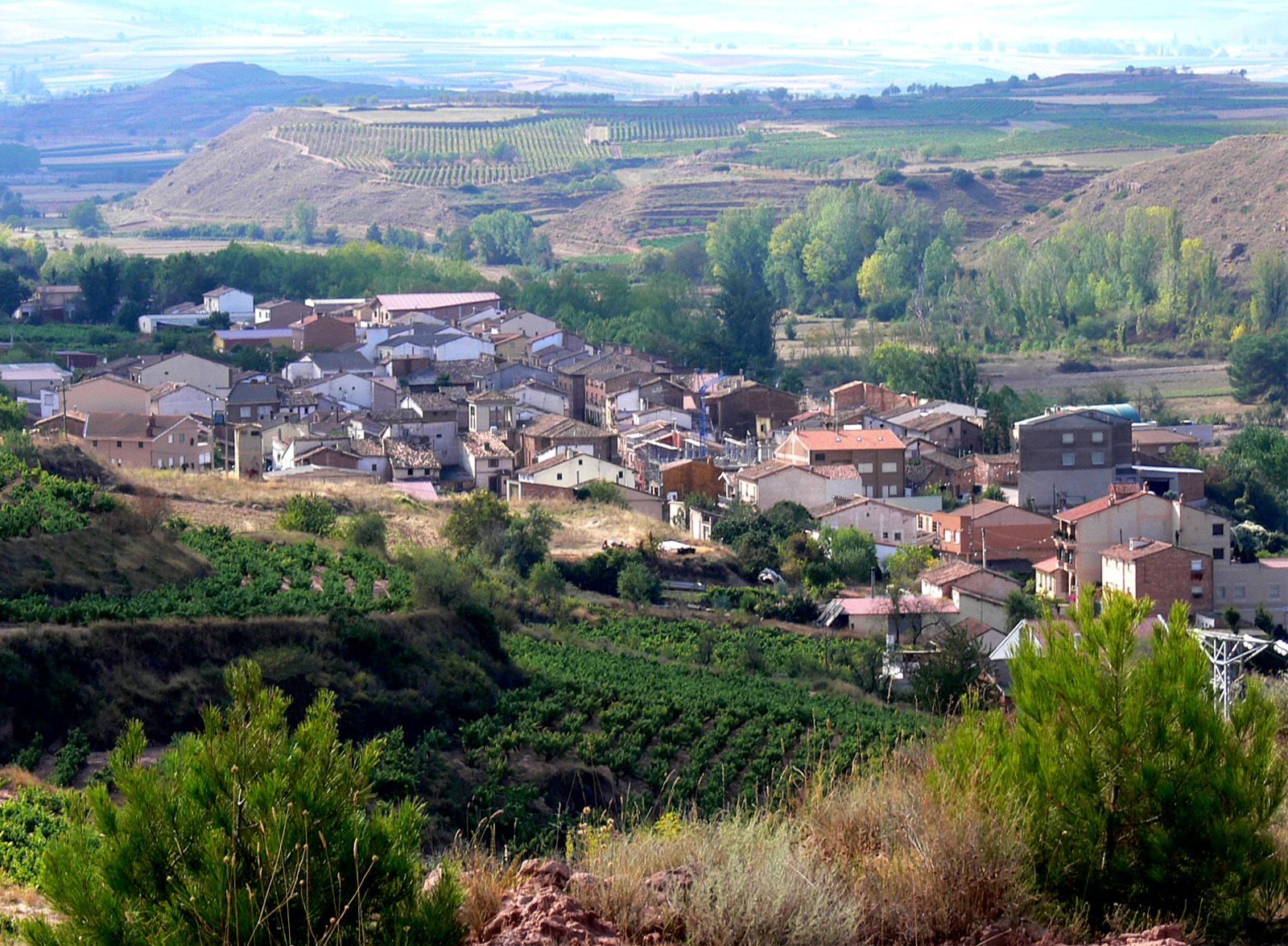

- Coat of arms

- Location of Cárdenas within La Rioja
- Coordinates: 42°22′27″N 2°46′02″W
- Country: Spain
- Autonomous community: La Rioja
- Comarca: Nájera

Government
  - Mayor: Gregorio Ramiro García Terreros

Area
  - Total: 3.98 km^{2} (1.54 sq mi)
- Elevation: 569 m (1,867 ft)

Population (2025-01-01)
  - Total: 132
  - Density: 33.2/km^{2} (85.9/sq mi)
- Demonym(s): cardenal, gitanillo, cardenajo
- Time zone: UTC+1 (CET)
  - Summer (DST): UTC+2 (CEST)
- Postal code: 26311

Cárdenas is a village in the province and autonomous community of La Rioja, Spain. The municipality covers an area of 3.98 square kilometres (1.54 sq mi) and as of 2011 had a population of 182 people.
