= Enzo Ruiz =

Enzo Ruiz may refer to:

- Enzo Ruiz (Uruguayan footballer) (born 1988), Uruguayan left back for Deportes La Serena
- Enzo Ruiz (Argentine footballer) (born 1989), Argentine footballer for Unión Española
