= Theresa A. Maldonado =

American electrical engineer and academic administrator

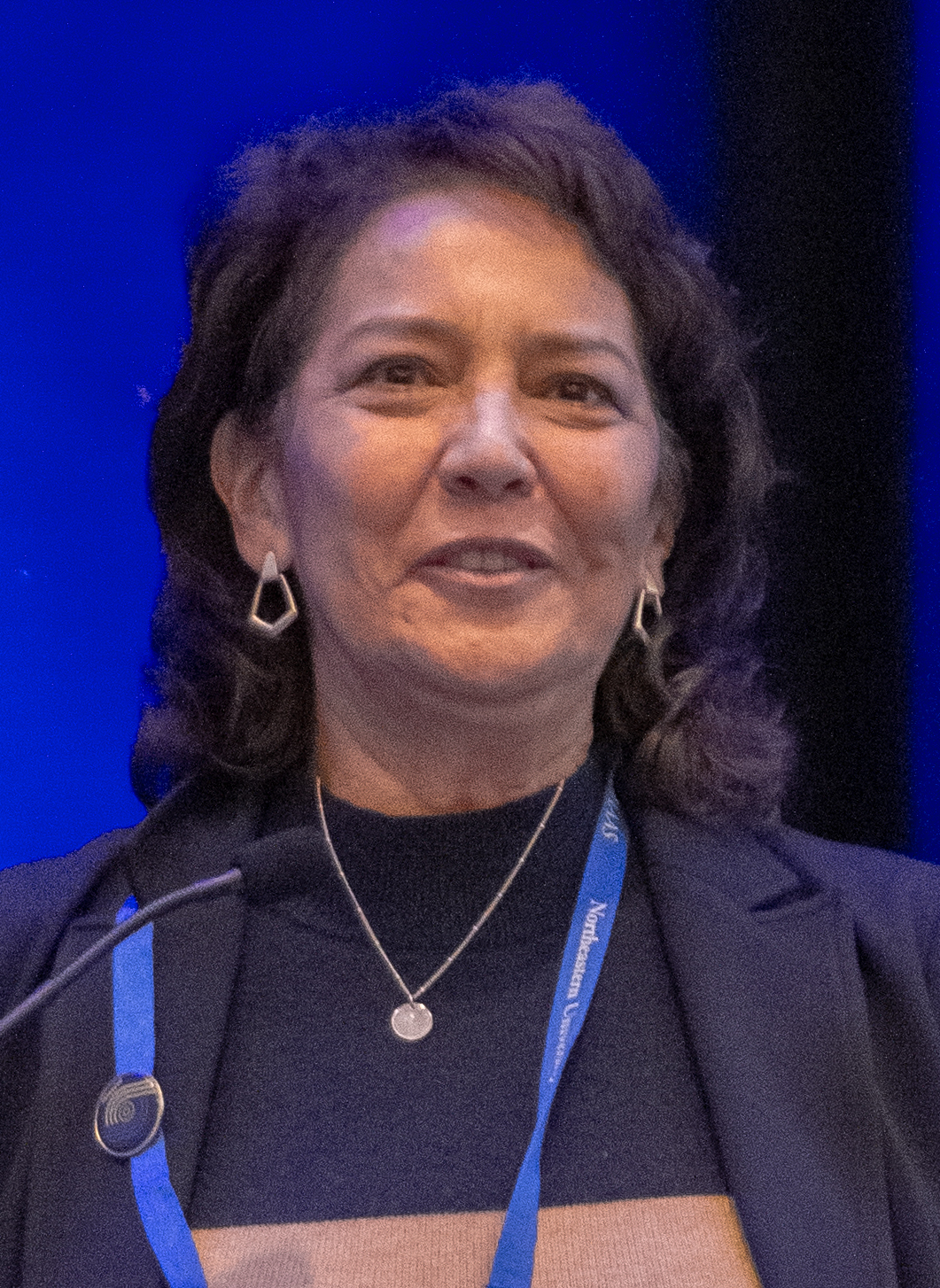
- Education: Macon Junior College; Georgia Tech
- Scientific career
- Fields: Electrical engineering
- Workplaces: AT&T Bell Laboratories; University of Texas at Arlington; National Science Foundation; Texas A&M University; University of Texas Rio Grande Valley; University of Texas at El Paso; University of California
- Doctoral advisor: Thomas K. Gaylord

Theresa Anna Maldonado is an American electrical engineer and academic administrator serving as the vice president for research and innovation at the University of California since 2020. She has served as the president-elect of the American Association for the Advancement of Science since March 2024.

Maldonado was the dean and Ritter Professor of Engineering at the University of Texas at El Paso College of Engineering from 2017 to 2020. Maldonado was an administrator at the National Science Foundation for six years.

== Life ==
Maldonado is Mexican American and was a first-generation college student. She earned an A.S. in mathematics from Macon Junior College in 1979. She completed a B.E.E. (1981), M.S.E. (1982), and a Ph.D. (1990) in electrical engineering with a minor in mathematics from the Georgia Tech. Her dissertation was titled, Analysis of Electro-optic/gyrotropic Biaxial Crystals for Bulk and Waveguide Applications. Thomas K. Gaylord was her doctoral advisor.

From 1977 to 1979, she worked in the audit department at Sears Roebuck in Warner Robins, Georgia. She was a technical staff member at AT&T Bell Laboratories from 1980 to 1986. She worked with optical fiber components and systems. From 1999 to 2001, she was a program director of the engineering research centers program at the National Science Foundation. Maldonado worked in a variety of roles at the University of Texas at Arlington from 1990 to 2003. She started as an assistant professor of electrical engineering and was promoted to associate professor, and professor. She served as the associate vice president for research from July 2002 to August 2003. She joined Texas A&M University in 2003 as a professor of electrical and computer engineering and associate dean for research of the Dwight Look College of Engineering. She served as the interim vice president for research from October 2008 to July 2009 and as the associate dean for strategic initiatives from October 2009 to December 2010. She was concurrently the associate vice chancellor for research at the Texas A&M University System from January to December 2010. Maldonado returned to the National Science Foundation from January 2011 to October 2014 to serve as the director of the engineering education and centers division. In this role, she oversaw a budget of US$135,000,000.

She served as the special assistant to the chief executive officer and executive vice president of the Texas A&M Health Science Center from October 2014 to May 2015. From June 2015 to July 2017 she worked at the University of Texas Rio Grande Valley as a professor of electrical engineering. She was its founding senior vice president for research, innovation, and economic development from 2015 to 2016. In July 2017, she became the dean of the college of engineering and the Ritter Professor of Engineering at the University of Texas at El Paso. In March 2020, she became the vice president for research and innovation at the University of California. She was a candidate to be president-elect of the American Association for the Advancement of Science. Maldonado was announced as the president-elect in March 2024. She is a member of the board of directors of the California Council on Science and Technology since 2020. As of 2026, she has received a Lifetime Contribution Award from the University of California, Los Angeles.
