= Gabriel Ruiz (footballer) =

Argentine footballer (born 1980)

Personal information
- Full name: Gabriel Osvaldo Ruiz
- Date of birth: January 23, 1980 (age 46)
- Place of birth: Arrecifes, Argentina
- Height: 1.79 m (5 ft 10 in)
- Position: Right-back

Youth career
- Newell's Old Boys

Senior career*
Years	Team	Apps	(Gls)
1999–2004	Newell's Old Boys	48	(0)
2004–2006	Tiro Federal	29	(0)
2006–2007	Libertad	0	(0)
2007	Unión Santa Fe	9	(0)
2007–2008	Gimnasia de Jujuy	18	(0)
2008–2009	FC Haka	0	(0)
2009–2010	Gimnasia de Jujuy	24	(0)
2010–2011	Talleres Córdoba	29	(1)
2011–2012	Guillermo Brown	6	(0)
2012–2013	Deportivo Maipú	24	(1)
2013–2014	Argentino Mendoza	12	(0)
2014	Tiro Federal	2	(0)
2015–2017	Unión de Sunchales	40	(0)
- * Club domestic league appearances and goals

Gabriel Osvaldo Ruiz (born January 23, 1980, in Arrecifes) is a retired Argentine football defender.

Ruiz started his playing career with Newell's Old Boys in 1999. In 2005, he joined Tiro Federal and helped the club to secure promotion to the Argentine Primera.

After Tiro Federal were relegated in 2006, Ruiz had brief stints with Libertad in Paraguay and 2nd division Unión de Santa Fe before joining Gimnasia de Jujuy in 2007.

At the beginning of May 2009 Ruiz signed for the Finnish Veikkausliiga team FC Haka. He failed to make debut for FC Haka and returned to Gimnasia de Jujuy.
