= Silvio Benítez =

Paraguayan footballer (born 1935)

Personal information
- Full name: Domingo Silvio Benítez Alfonso
- Date of birth: 3 November 1935 (age 90)
- Place of birth: Tacumbú, Asunción, Paraguay
- Position: Goalkeeper

Youth career
- Presidente Hayes

Senior career*
Years	Team	Apps	(Gls)
1953–1962	Presidente Hayes		
1963–1964	River Plate Asunción		
1965–1966	Ferrobádminton	26+	(0)
1967–1968	América de Cali		
1969	Sportivo Luqueño		

International career
- Paraguay
- * Club domestic league appearances and goals

Domingo Silvio Benítez Alfonso (born 3 November 1935) is a former football goalkeeper, basketball player and coach.

== Career ==
Benítez was born in Tacumbú, Paraguay. He started his career at Presidente Hayes from his hometown, Tacumbú. Afterwards he moved to C.A. River Plate of Asunción. In 1965 he went to Chile to play for Ferrobadminton where he won the Primera B league and continued with them in the 1966 Primera División. After two years in América de Cali he returned to Paraguay to play in Sportivo Luqueño and end his career.

Benítez also played basketball for Presidente Hayes for a few years.

As a coach, he managed the following football teams: Presidente Hayes (1972 and 1973), Sportivo San Lorenzo, Club 12 de Octubre and 12 de Junio (Liga Chaqueña).

== Honours ==
=== As a player ===
Season	Team	Title
1965	Ferrobadminton	Chilean 2nd division

=== As a coach ===
Season	Team	Title
1973	Presidente Hayes	Paraguayan 2nd division
