= Juan Maldonado (footballer, born 1986) =

Argentine footballer

Personal information
- Full name: Juan Carlos Maldonado
- Date of birth: 7 September 1986 (age 40)
- Place of birth: La Falda, Argentina
- Height: 1.75 m (5 ft 9 in)
- Position: Midfielder

Senior career*
Years	Team	Apps	(Gls)
2006–2012	Belgrano	80	(6)
2007–2008	→ Palestino (loan)	34	(9)
2008	→ Racing de Olavarría (loan)	–	(–)
2012	→ Coquimbo Unido (loan)	11	(4)
2013	→ Deportes Antofagasta (loan)	9	(0)
2014	Instituto	7	(0)
2015	Oriente Petrolero	0	(0)
2015–2016	Deportes La Serena	28	(2)
2016–2017	Atlético La Falda	–	(–)
2017–2019	River Plate La Falda	8	(2)
2023	Laguna Blanca	1	(0)
Total		178	(23)
- * Club domestic league appearances and goals

Juan Carlos Maldonado (born 7 September 1986) is an Argentine former footballer. His last professional club was then Primera B club Deportes La Serena.

== Career ==
A product of Belgrano de Córdoba, Maldonado made his professional debut in 2006. Abroad, he played in Chile and Bolivia. In Chile, he played for Palestino, Coquimbo Unido, Deportes Antofagasta and Deportes La Serena.

== Personal life ==
Maldonado married the Spanish-born German footballer Rebecca Schuster, who is the daughter of the former Germany international Bernd Schuster. They have two sons, both youth football players.

He started an eponymous football academy, "Juan Carlos Maldonado".
