= Juan Maldonado (Jesuit) =

Spanish theologian

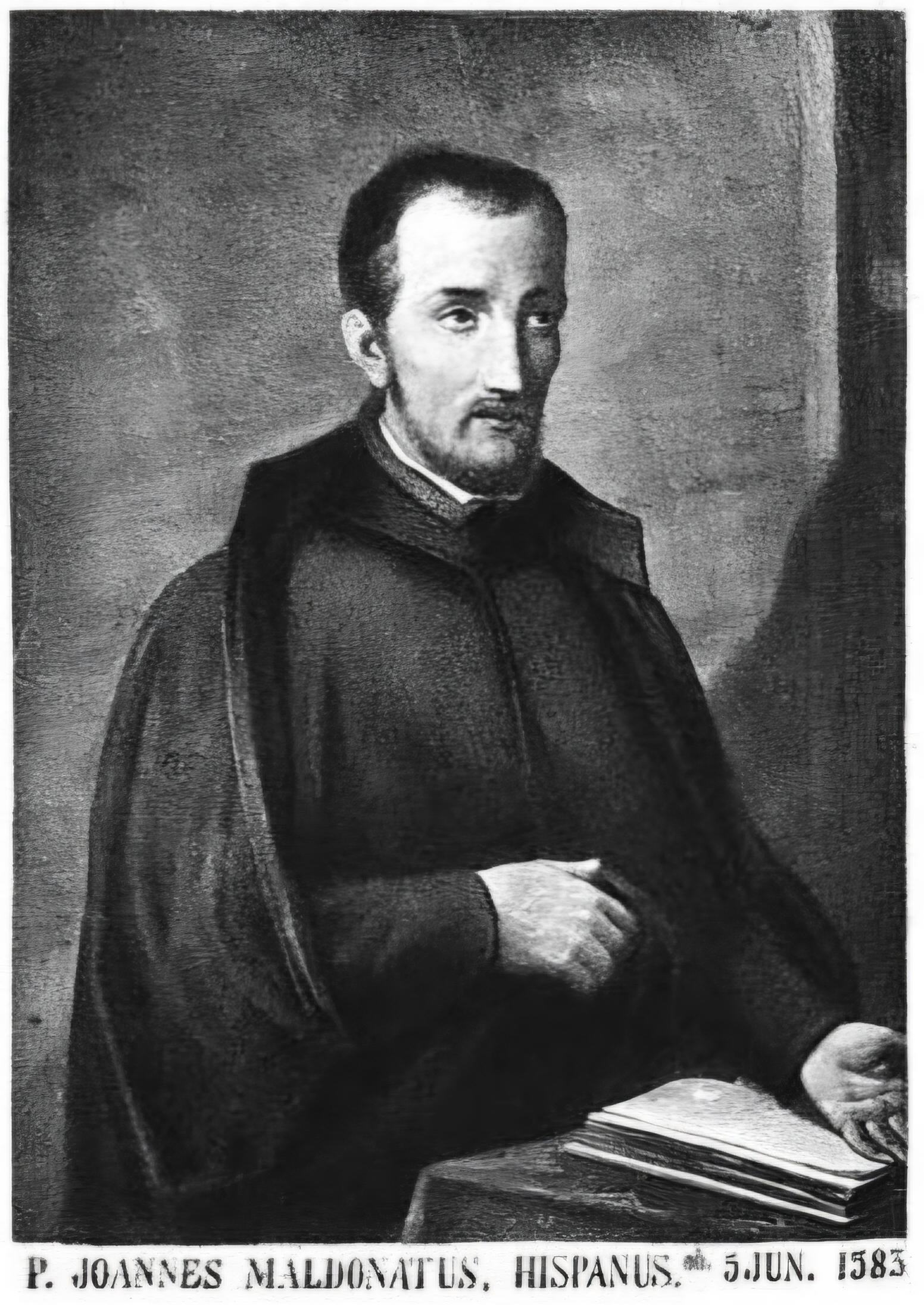
Juan Maldonado

Juan Maldonado S.J. (Latin: Ioannes Maldonatus; 1533 in Casas de Reina, Llerena, Extremadura – 5 January 1583 in Rome) was a Spanish Jesuit theologian and exegete.

== Life ==
At the age of fourteen or fifteen he went to the University of Salamanca, where he studied Latin with two blind professors, who were men of great erudition. He also studied Greek with Hernán Núñez (el Pinciano), philosophy with Francisco de Toledo (afterwards a cardinal), and theology with Domingo Soto. He declared, as late as the year 1574, that he had forgotten nothing he had learned in grammar and philosophy. Having finished his course of three years in the latter of these two studies, Maldonado would have devoted himself to jurisprudence with a view to the exalted offices of the magistracy; but, persuaded by one of his fellow-students, though to the disgust of those upon whom he was dependent, he turned his attention to theology - a choice of which he never repented. Having studied the sacred sciences for four years, and passed through the examination and exercises of the doctorate, he taught philosophy, theology, and Greek for some time in the University of Salamanca. The register of the Salamanca College of the Society states that he was admitted there in 1558 and sent to Rome to be received. He took the Jesuit habit in the Novitiate of San Andrea, 19 August 1562, was ordained priest in the following year, and for some months heard cases of conscience in the Roman College.

The Collège de Clermont having been opened in Paris, Maldonado was sent thither in the autumn of 1563. In February, 1564, he commenced lecturing on Aristotle's De Anima. From 1565 to 1569 he lectured in theology. His health beginning to fail, a year of rest followed, during which (1570) he gave missions in Poitou, where Calvinism was prevalent, and he was so successful that the people of Poitiers petitioned for a Jesuit College.

From 1570 to 1576, he again lectured in theology, also delivering conferences to the court, by royal command, and effecting the conversion of various Protestant princes. At the instance of the Duc de Montpensier, he proceeded to Sedan, to bring back to Catholicism the Duchess de Bouillon (the duke's daughter), who had become a Calvinist. He held, in her presence, some very notable disputations with Protestant preachers. During the absence of the provincial, he also acted for some months as vice-provincial, when his uprightness was vindicated in an action brought against him by the heirs of the President de Montbrun de Saint-André, and in the case of the novice Jannel, who entered the Society in opposition to his parents' wishes. The Parliament proclaimed his innocence.

In consequence of rivalries on the part of the professors of the university, the pope assigned him to teach theology at Toulouse, but this was prevented by the Calvinists, who blocked the roads leading thither and he withdrew to Bourges to write his "Commentary on the Gospels". In 1578-79 he was visitor of the French Province of the Society, and then returned to continue his labours at Bourges. The province chose him, in 1580, as elector at the fourth general congregation, at Rome, where he delivered the opening discourse. Acquaviva, having been elected general, ordered him to remain at Rome, and Pope Gregory XIII appointed him to the commission for revising the text of the Septuagint.

In 1583, fifteen days before his death, when he had not yet completed his fiftieth year, he delivered to the general his unfinished commentaries. He died in Rome on 5 January 1583, aged 49.

== Teaching ==
Theology in Paris had fallen into decay through the prevalence of philosophical quibbles and barbarous Latin; this Maldonado remedied, giving due precedence to Scripture, the Fathers, tradition and the theologians, relegating the philosophers to the lowest place, and keeping useless questions within bounds; he spoke Latin elegantly, and drew up a scheme of theology more complete than that which had been in use, adapting it to the needs of the Church and of France. The lecture-room and, after it, the refectory were found to be too small; Maldonado therefore carried on his classes, when the weather permitted, in the college courtyard. Nobles, magistrates, doctors of the Sorbonne, college professors prelates, religious, and even Huguenot preachers went to hear him, engaging their places in advance, and sometimes arriving three hours before the beginning of the lecture. Bishops and other great personages living away from Paris employed copyists to transmit his lectures to them.

In 1574, the university accused him of impugning the Immaculate Conception of Mary. This was untrue, as he held only that the doctrine was not as yet an article of faith, but that one might properly take a vow to defend it; Pierre de Gondi, Bishop of Paris, decided in his favour (January, 1575). Again, he was accused teaching that the pains of purgatory last ten years at most. What he really taught was that the duration of those pains is unknown and it would be rash to attempt to determine it, however, he favoured the opinion of Soto, that in some cases purgatory did not last longer than ten years.

Being an excellent theologian, well grounded, at Salamanca, in Latin and Greek, having also learned Hebrew, Syriac, Chaldaic, and Arabic in Paris, and knowing all that was then known of ancient history, the Fathers and the false interpretations of the heretics, Maldonado became, according to the opinion of Kuhn, superior to most exegetes of his time, and inferior to none. In Cornely's opinion, his "Commentaries on the Gospels" are the best ever published. He excelled, according to Simon, in explanation of the literal sense; according to Andres, in his comprehension of the text and in gathering the aptest and truest sense, leaving no difficulty unexamined.

Maldonado has played a major role in French demonology. He was of the opinion that a storm of demons is followed by the spread of heresy (Protestantism). Heresy degenerates in atheism and magic. Demons use heretics to deceive mankind. In his view, the denial of demons is as great a sin as atheism. Witchcraft and heresy are connected by curiosity. "More women than men are witches, since women are more curious."

== Works ==
- "Commentarii in quatuor Evangelistas", early editions: Pont-a-Mousson, 2 vols., folio 1596-97 (Lyons, 1598, 1607, 1615); (Mainz, 1602, 1604); (Paris, 1617, 1621); (Brescia, 2 vols., 4o, 1598), (Venice 1606); modern editions: (Mainz, 5 vols., 8o, 1840; 2 vols., 1853–63; id., 1874); (Barcelona 10 vols., 1881–82); "Commentary on St. Matthew" in Migne, "Curs Script."
- "Disputationum ac controversiarum decisarum et circa septem Ecclesiae Romanae Sacramenta" (2 vols., Lyons, 1614).
- "De Caeremoniis Tractatus", I -CCX, in Vol. III of Zaccaria's "Biblioth. ritual." Simon gives extracts in "Lettres choisies."

Apocryphal are:

- "Traicté des anges et demons", a translation of some of Maldonado's expositions collected by one of his pupils
- "Summula R. P. Maldonati", a compilation made by Martin Codognat, placed on the Index, 16 December 1605.

Manuscripts, exegetical and theological, attributed to Maldonado, are preserved in many libraries of France (especially the National), Switzerland, Italy, and Spain; many of them are copies made by his pupils.
