= Parra (disambiguation) =

Parra is a Spanish and Portuguese surname.

Parra may also refer to:

== Places ==
- La Parra, a municipality in the province of Badajoz, Extremadura, Spain
- Parra, Goa, a village in the Bardez sub-district of Goa, India
- Local slang for Parramatta, a major suburb in Sydney, Australia
  - The Parramatta Eels, a rugby league club based in Parramatta

== Other uses ==
- Parra letters, used in Colonial orthography for Mayan languages

== See also ==
- Para (disambiguation)
