= Ibáñez (surname) =

Ibáñez is a Spanish patronymic surname, derived from the personal name Ibán, a variant of Juan. Notable people with the name include:

- Adolfo Ibáñez, Chilean politician
- Alejandra Ibáñez (born 2000), American wheelchair basketball player
- Andy Ibáñez, Cuban baseball player
- Carlos Ibáñez del Campo (1877–1960), Chilean military officer and President 1927–1931 and 1952–1958
- César Ibáñez (footballer, born 1992), Mexican football player
- César Ibáñez (footballer, born 1999), Argentine football player
- Chicho Ibáñez (1875–1981), Cuban musician
- Saint Domingo Ibáñez de Erquicia (1589–1633), Spanish missionary and Catholic saint
- Enrique Vera Ibáñez (born 1954), Mexican/Swedish race walker
- Francisco Ibáñez de Peralta (1644–1712), Spanish colonial administrator, Royal Governor of Chile 1700–1709
- Francisco Ibáñez Talavera (1936–2023), Spanish cartoonist, Mortadelo y Filemón
- Germán Pedro Ibáñez (1928–2007), Cuban musical director
- Jone Ibañez (born 1997), Spanish footballer
- Jorge Batlle Ibáñez (1927–2016), President of Uruguay 2000–2005
- José Ibañez (born 1951), Cuban judoka
- José Ibáñez (cyclist) (born 1968), Colombian road cyclist
- Luis Ibáñez (born 1988), Argentine football player
- Narciso Ibáñez Menta (1912–2004), Spanish actor
- Óscar Ibáñez (born 1967), Peruvian football player
- Osmar Ibáñez Barba (born 1988), Spanish football player
- Pablo Ibáñez (born 1981), Spanish football player
- Paco Ibáñez (born 1934), Spanish singer and musician
- Raúl Ibañez (born 1972), baseball player
- Raphaël Ibañez (born 1973), French rugby player
- Roberto Ibáñez (born 1985), Ecuadorian judoka
- Roger Ibañez (born 1998), Brazilian football player
- Salvador Ibáñez (1854–1920), Spanish luthier
- Sérgio Ibáñez (born 1999), Spanish Paralympic judoka
- Suleika Ibáñez (1930–2013), Uruguayan writer, teacher, and translator
- Vicente Blasco Ibáñez (1867–1928), Spanish novelist, screenwriter and film director
