= Cardenas, Panama =

Township in the old Panama Canal Zone

Cardenas was a township in the old Panama Canal Zone. Built on a site that was originally intended for Panama Canal Company housing, it was originally founded to house Federal Aviation Administration personnel. It housed 425 FAA personnel. Later, the 120 housing units built for the FAA were supplemented by 11 homes for staff members of the Middle America Research Unit (MARU), a medical research laboratory of the National Institute of Health (NIH).

== Overview ==
Its only access from the main road system (specifically, Gaillard Highway) was on a road which started from Corozal. The main cemetery for the Panama Canal Zone, the Corozal American Cemetery, was located along this road. Past the cemetery was the LDS Church meetinghouse. The road continued to climb as it went past these until cresting a hill, with Cardenas located on the back slope of the hill. The Jungle on three of its sides were part of various military bases, mostly Fort Clayton and Albrook Air Force Base.

There were no stores or other services located in Cardenas, apart from one community center. In 1971, the site was characterized as "the most isolated community in the canal zone with respect to recreational facilities."

Boy Scout Troop 14 had its meetings at the Cardenas Community Center.

An abandoned road linked Cardenas to the Clayton-Albrook Road and was used by kids living in Cardenas to access Clayton, Curundu and Albrook by bicycle.
