= Juan Maldonado (footballer, born 1990) =

Paraguayan footballer

Personal information
- Full name: Juan Gabriel Maldonado Ovelar
- Date of birth: 18 May 1990 (age 36)
- Place of birth: Asunción, Paraguay
- Height: 1.75 m (5 ft 9 in)
- Position: Forward

Team information
- Current team: Cerro Porteño
- Number: 20

Senior career*
Years	Team	Apps	(Gls)
2008–	Cerro Porteño	6	(3)

International career^{‡}
2007	Paraguay U-17	4	(1)
- * Club domestic league appearances and goals as of 3 February 2010 ‡ National team caps and goals as of 3 February 2010

Juan Gabriel Maldonado Ovelar (born 18 May 1990) is a Paraguayan football forward. He currently plays for Cerro Porteño.

Maldonado has played reserve division where he has scored goals, but is not a regular player on the first team squad. In the Clausura 2010 he entered for Pablo Zeballos in his third game for Cerro Porteño and scored his first goal.
