= 1989 Nobel Prize in Literature =

- Camilo José Cela
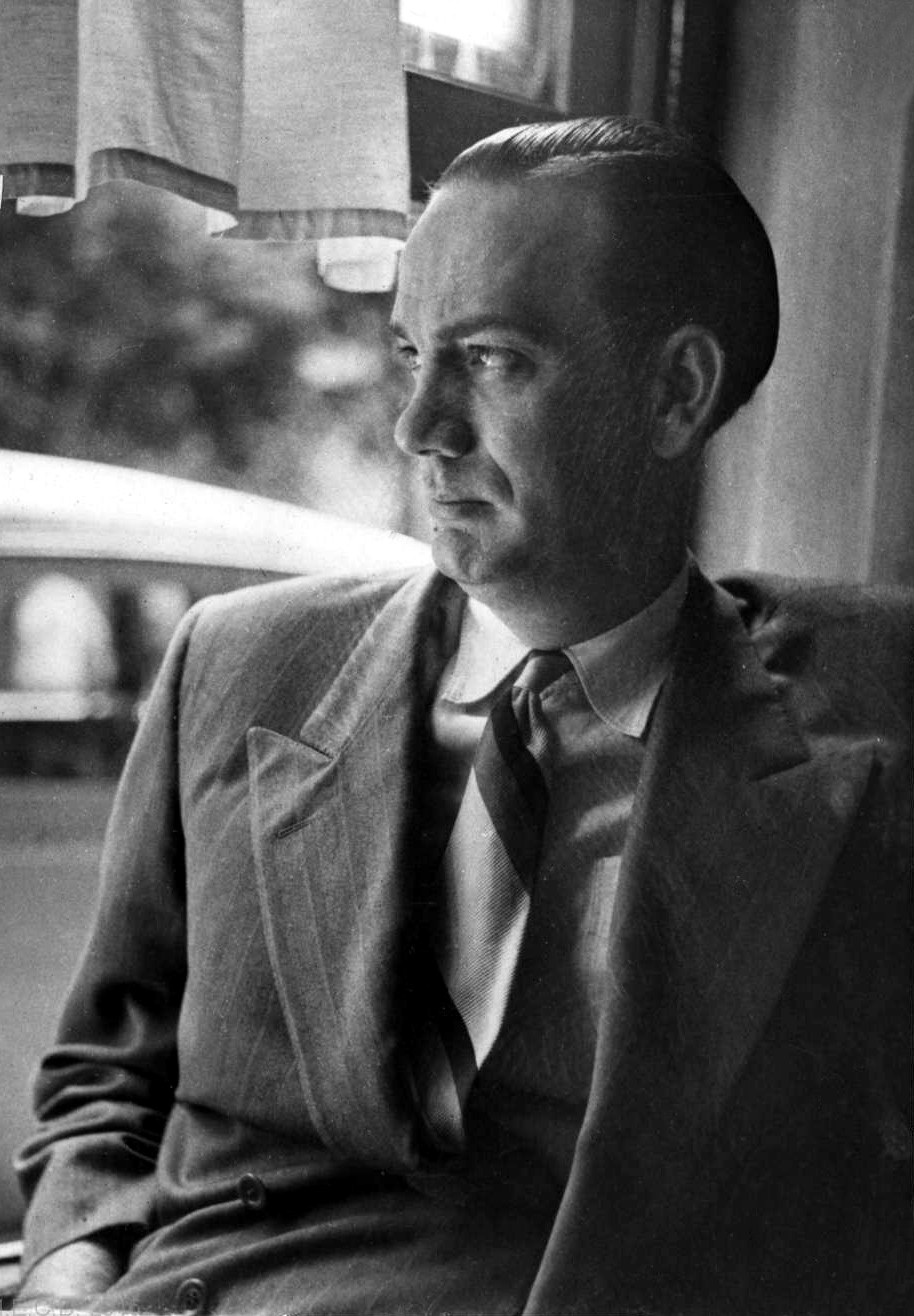
- "for a rich and intensive prose, which with restrained compassion forms a challenging vision of man's vulnerability."
- Date: 19 October 1989 (announcement); 10 December 1989 (ceremony)
- Location: Stockholm, Sweden
- Presented by: Swedish Academy
- First award: 1901
- Website: Official website

The 1989 Nobel Prize in Literature was awarded to the Spanish writer Camilo José Cela, 1st Marquis of Iria Flavia (1916–2002) "for a rich and intensive prose, which with restrained compassion forms a challenging vision of man's vulnerability." He is the fifth Nobel recipient from Spain after the poet Vicente Aleixandre in 1977.

== Laureate ==
Experiencing the Spanish Civil War left its mark on Camilo José Cela's writing. He also experiments with form and content in his writing, which is a feature of the Spanish tradition of humorous grotesquerie. La familia de Pascual Duarte ("The Family of Pascual Duarte", 1942) and La colmena ("The Hive", 1951), are two of his most well-known compositions. While General Francisco Franco's dictatorship in Spain was in effect, he served as editor of the publication Papeles de Son Armadáns and gave voice to those who wanted to express themselves freely. One of his better-known avant-garde novels, San Camilo, 1936 (1969), is one continuous stream of consciousness. He has also written the famous Galician trilogy: Mazurca para dos muertos ("Mazurka for Two Dead People", 1983), La cruz de San Andrés ("St. Andrew's Cross", 1994), and Madera de boj ("Boxwood", 1999).

== Nominations ==
Camilo José Cela was first nominated for the Nobel Prize in Literature in 1964, and again in 1973 when the Nobel committee received two nominations for Cela. Later nominations and deliberations by the Nobel committee are not yet officially known, as the records are kept secret for fifty years.

== Reactions ==
Some scholars questioned the Swedish Academy's choice of Cela over the internationally better known Spanish-language writers Carlos Fuentes and Octavio Paz (awarded the following year). Others thought it was a conventional, safe choice of an author with his greatest productivity and impact largely behind him, and that a bolder choice would have been an East German writer or Salman Rushdie.

Julio Ortega, a professor of Hispanic studies at Brown University, said that Cela symbolized a changing, modernizing Spain. "Among the older writers," he said, "Cela represents the searching for a better literature from the Franco years, through the democratic experiments and into European Spain. At the same time, he remained very Spanish, keeping the cultural traditions of Spanish art and literature in his writing. He didn't follow a European literature, but developed his own style, and so, in his way, symbolized Spain's going through a long process of adjustment."

In Spain, the Nobel prize to Cela was celebrated. Jorge Semprún, Cultural Minister of Spain and himself a writer, said: "It's great news for Spanish literature. He is one of our great prose writers." Cela himself said: "I offer it to all Spanish literature. I think other Spanish and Latin American writers in Spanish could have won it as well as me."

== Nobel lecture ==
Camilo José Cela delivered his Nobel lecture entitled Eulogia de la Fabula, Eulogy to the Fable, on 8 December 1989.

== Award ceremony speech ==
At the award ceremony in Stockholm on 10 December 1989, Knut Ahnlund of the Swedish Academy said:

Camilo José Cela has written upwards of a hundred books, a veritable library in itself, filled with the most astounding contrasts, popular, crudely humorous tales side by side with some of the darkest and most desolate works in European literature. (...) As a whole, what we have before us is an extraordinary rich, weighty and substantial body of writings that possess great wildness, license and violence, but which nonetheless in no way lack sympathy or common human feeling, unless we demand that those sentiments should be expressed in the simplest possible way. Cela has renewed and revitalized the Spanish language as few others have done in our modern age. As a creator of language he is in the tradition of Cervantes, Góngora, Quevedo, Valle-Inclán and Garcia Lorca, Spanish has not really been quite the same language since those writers have put their marks in its great book.
