= La Alcarria =

La Alcarria The Alcarria
- Natural region
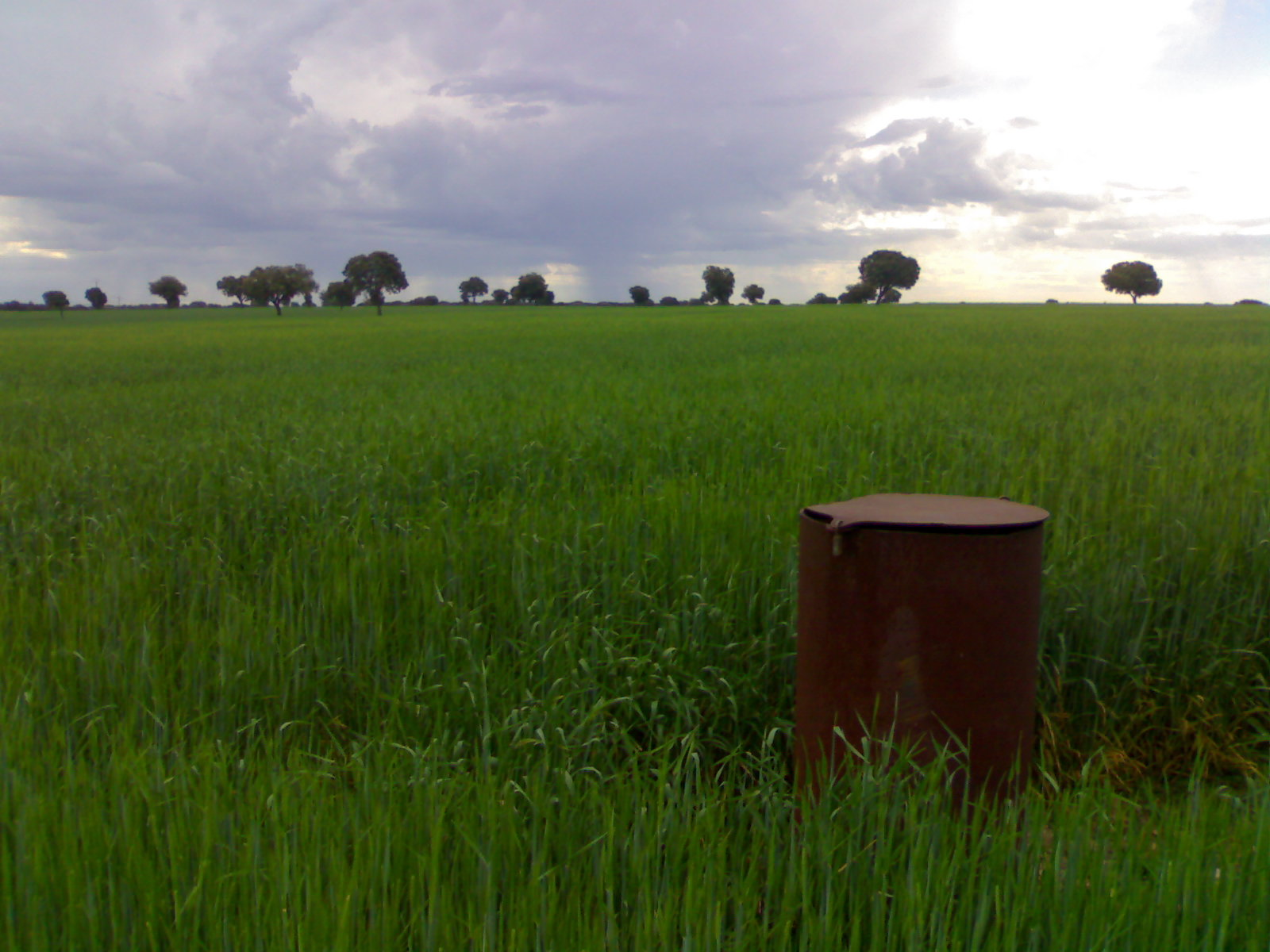
- Landscape in La Alcarria

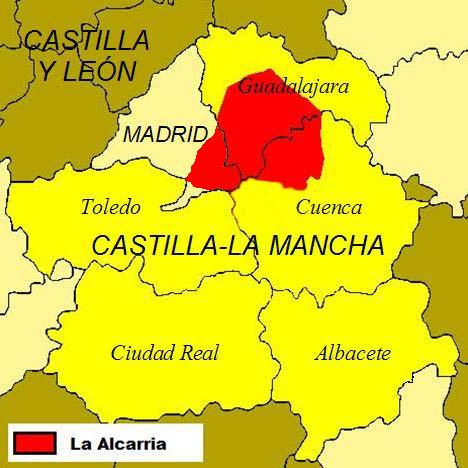
- Map of the region overlapped with Castilla–La Mancha and the Community of Madrid

- Location within Spain
- Coordinates: 40°18′24″N 2°52′23″W
- Country: Spain
- Elevation: 750 m (2,460 ft)

La Alcarria, also referred to as the Alcarria in English, is a natural region in Castile, central Spain, located mainly in Guadalajara Province but also overlapping those of Cuenca and Madrid. Its principal attractions are its fauna and flora and it is noted for its honey, olives, and a special breed of lamb.

The most notable towns in the region are: Almonacid de Zorita, Brihuega, Cifuentes, Nuevo Baztán, Huete, Guadalajara, Chinchón, Arganda del Rey, Illana, Priego, Jadraque, Cañaveras, Loeches, Campo Real, Mondéjar, Pastrana, Sacedón, Trillo and Villalba del Rey.

The region figures prominently in the travel book Viaje a la Alcarria (Journey to the Alcarria) by Camilo José Cela.

== Name ==
The name Alcarria may derive from the Andalusian Arabic term al-Qaryat, related to the word alquería (a small farmstead), reflecting the historical settlement pattern of the region through small rural farmhouses, many of which gradually grew into villages. Other authors link the name Alcarria with the pre-roman term"car/kar", related to "rock, stone", pervasive in the landscape of the region and in the ethymology of different villages and towns, including the preroman "Arriaca" (N.B. harriak = "stones, rocks" in Basque), currently in the town named "Guadalajara" ( wādī al-ḥijāra = "river of stones" in Arabic), homonym of the province where the largest share of Alcarria is.

== Geography ==
La Alcarria is a kind of plateau brought out by the rising of the Sistema Ibérico. The strata that form this plateau are smoothly undulating. Limestones and gypsum are common because of its origins below the sea surface (from the Mesozoic Era); the red sandstone and the earth-originated conglomerated stones were more recently formed. Over this strata of sedimentary stones, the rivers have originated deep and quite often, broad valleys, gorges and many other karst phenomena, as those that can be seen in the north of the Province of Cuenca (Las Majadas, El Hosquillo, La Ciudad Encantada, Ravines of the rivers Beteta and Júcar and in almost the whole Province of Guadalajara (Canyon of River Dulce, high course of River Tagus, Ravine of River Corduentes and below the waters of the reservoir of Entrepeñas, also in the River Tagus). Is precisely, the name of Entrepeñas (among rocks) the one that represents the character of all the area, since River Tagus forms there a beautiful canyon close to Sacedón, where that dam is.

The upper level of the plateau of La Alcarria is quite uniform as can be seen in the photo, although it descends softly from north to south. In this image you can also see the sudden valley to the right (to the South of Escamilla) made by the valley of the River Guadiela.

== History ==
The region was inhabited during Roman times and the Moorish period, as evidenced by architectural remains scattered throughout various settlements. One of the most significant archaeological sites in the region is Recópolis, a Visigothic city founded in 578 by King Liuvigild near Zorita de los Canes, which was subsequently occupied by Moorish and then Christian settlers.

During the medieval period, the towns of the Alcarria developed under Christian rule following the Reconquista, with many acquiring significant architectural and artistic heritage. Pastrana became an important ducal seat, and Brihuega grew into a notable textile centre, home to the Royal Cloth Factory (Real Fábrica de Paños), founded by King Ferdinand VI in 1750, which drew on a local textile tradition dating back to the 13th century.

== Economy ==
The economy of La Alcarria is primarily based on agriculture, beekeeping, livestock farming and, in larger towns near industrial corridors, manufacturing and logistics.

=== Honey ===
La Alcarria is famous throughout Spain for its honey, produced from the nectar of wild aromatic plants — principally rosemary (Rosmarinus officinalis), lavender (Lavandula latifolia) and thyme (Thymus spp.) — that grow abundantly on the calcareous plateau soils. Beekeeping is an ancestral activity in the region, deeply rooted in local traditions. The honey is classified into three types under its protected designation: monofloral rosemary honey, monofloral lavender honey, and multifloral honey.

The honey of La Alcarria has held a Protected Designation of Origin (PDO) under Spanish law since 11 November 1992, and has been registered as a European Union PDO since 21 June 1996. The production area covers 150 municipalities in the province of Guadalajara and 70 in the province of Cuenca.

=== Other products ===
Other notable local products include the Alcarria lamb (cordero de la Alcarria), olive oil, and wines with designations of origin from Mondéjar and Sacedón–Arganda.

In terms of industry, larger municipalities close to the Henares industrial corridor have developed manufacturing and services. Guadalajara and Arganda del Rey are important industrial centres linked to the Madrid metropolitan area. Brihuega has developed a notable tile and flooring industry, while Mondéjar is known for furniture production and Torija for logistics.

== Flora and fauna ==
The landscape of La Alcarria presents a notable contrast between the holm oak (Quercus ilex) woodlands and dryland cereal crops of the plateau, and the small market gardens, olive groves and aromatic scrubland of the valley slopes. The abundance of rosemary, lavender and thyme gives the region a characteristic scent, particularly in summer, and has earned Brihuega in particular the informal nickname of the "Provence of Spain" or the "Garden of the Alcarria". This rich flora supports significant populations of honeybees and other pollinators, as well as wildlife including red partridge, rabbits and hares.

== Culture and literature ==
The landscape of La Alcarria has served as the backdrop for several celebrated works of literature. Most notably, Camilo José Cela immortalised the region in his 1948 travel book Viaje a la Alcarria, in which he narrated his journey through the area in the spring of 1946. The town of Torija hosts the Museum of the Journey to the Alcarria (Museo del Viaje a la Alcarria), dedicated to Cela's work and the natural heritage of the province of Guadalajara.

The region also has connections to notable historical figures: Cifuentes is the birthplace of the Princess of Éboli, a prominent figure at the court of Philip II of Spain.

== See also ==
- Comarcas of Spain
- Pastrana
- Brihuega
