= El Recuenco =

El Recuenco, Spain
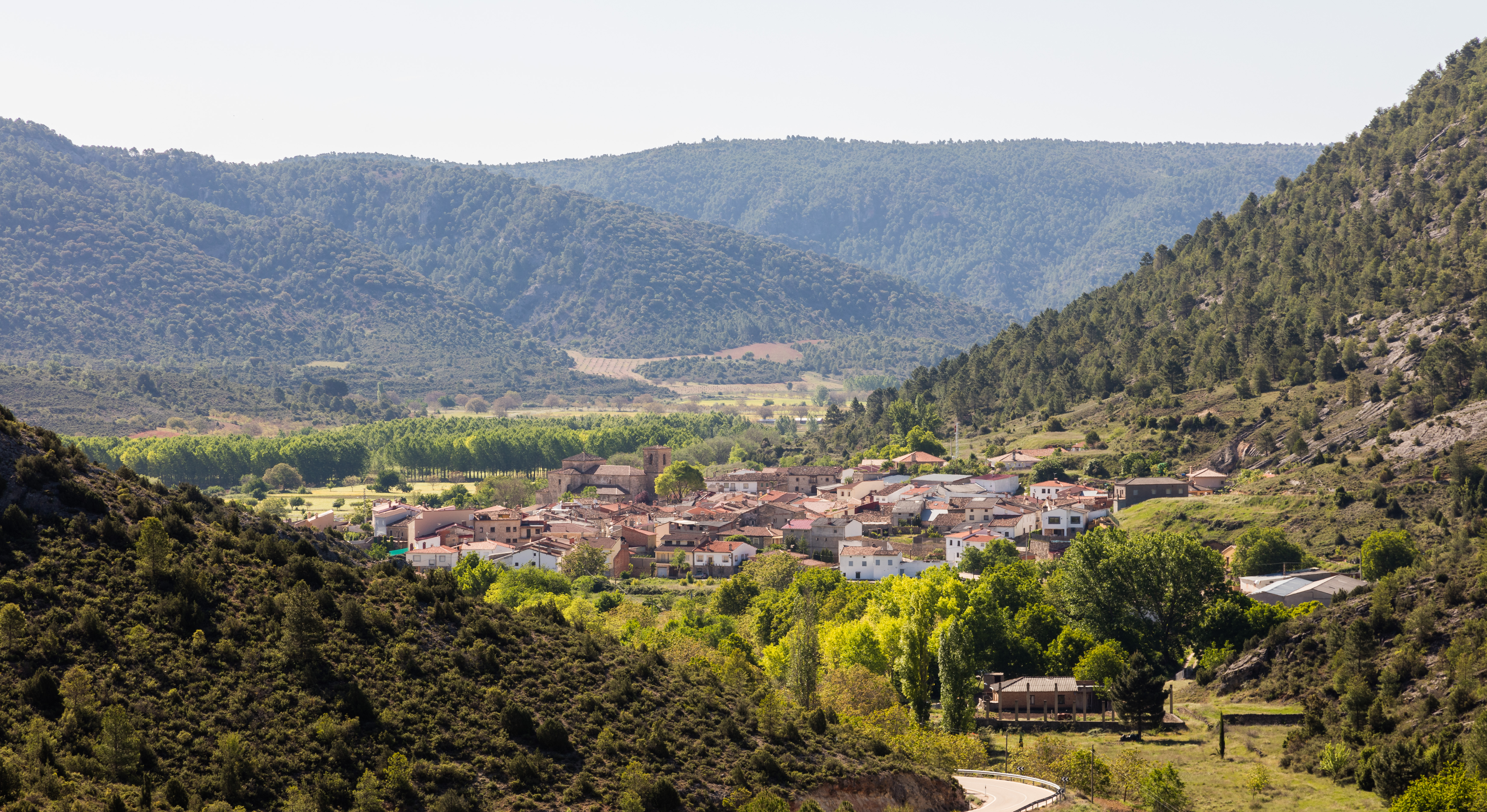

- Flag Coat of arms

- Location within Province of Guadalajara Location within Castilla-La Mancha Location within Spain
- Coordinates: 40°37′0″N 2°20′18″W
- Country: Spain
- Autonomous community: Castile-La Mancha
- Province: Guadalajara
- Municipality: El Recuenco
- judicial Party: Guadalajara

Government
  - Mayor: Enrique Collada Sánchez

Area
  - Total: 75.18 km^{2} (29.03 sq mi)

Population (2025-01-01)
  - Total: 80
  - Density: 1.1/km^{2} (2.8/sq mi)
- Time zone: UTC+1 (CET)
  - Summer (DST): UTC+2 (CEST)

El Recuenco is a municipality located in the province of Guadalajara, Castile-La Mancha, Spain, between the mountains of Cuenca, Alcarria and the Alto Tajo.

== Geography ==
=== Land ===
The municipality is located on a plateau, with an average altitude of 1,200 meters and a high point 1,302 meters above sea level, at its northern part. This high position permits a slight adjustment in plants with the ability to grow, examples being: pines, oaks, rosemary, and juniper.

=== Ruins ===
While few ruins are known in the region, specifically because of the centuries of farmland use by the poor, a few to note are tucked away in the hills, marking the peasants' past presence here. These ruins are of huts and livestock, simple and fragile structures and animal remains from the 3rd and 4th centuries, abandoned in the mid-20th century.

Fossils have been found in this region dating as far back as the Plio-Pleistocene era.

== Demographics ==
According to the 2010 census (INE), the municipality had a population of 97 inhabitants, five more than at the 2004 census.

The population has decreased since the 2001 census, with 114 inhabitants.

== See also ==
- Guadalajara, Castile-La Mancha
- Province of Guadalajara
