= Rest Home =

1943 novel by Camilo José Cela

- Title page for Pabellón de reposo (1984 edition)
- Author: Camilo José Cela
- Original title: Pabellón de reposo
- Language: Spanish
- Publisher: Afrodisio Aguado
- Publication date: 1943
- Publication place: Spain
- English publication date: 1961
- Pages: 240

Rest Home (Spanish: Pabellón de reposo) is a 1943 novel by the Spanish writer Camilo José Cela.

== Plot ==
The novel is about seven severely ill people at a tuberculosis sanatorium. The patients barely communicate with each other, but express themselves in diaries, letters and memoirs. The book is in two parts, each containing one chapter from the perspective of each of the patients, plus an intermission in the middle and an epilogue at the end. The texts are presented as a compiled by "CJC".

The story was inspired by Cela's stays at tuberculosis sanatoria in 1931 and 1942.

== Reception ==
Rest Home was Cela's second novel, published to high expectations due to the success of his debut from the year before, The Family of Pascual Duarte. Before it was published as a book, Rest Home ran as a serial in El Español in 24 parts from March to August 1943. The book was banned at Spanish tuberculosis sanatoria. It was published in English translation in 1961.
