= Harold Scheraga =

American biophysicist (1921–2020)

- Born: October 18, 1921; Brooklyn, New York, U.S.
- Died: August 1, 2020 (aged 98); Ithaca, New York, U.S.
- Education: City College of New York; Duke University
- Known for: Theoretical and computational studies of protein folding
- Awards: William H. Nichols Medal (1974)
- Scientific career
- Fields: Biophysics
- Workplaces: Cornell University
- Thesis: Kinetics of the thermal chlorination of benzal chloride (1946)
- Doctoral advisor: P.M. Gross & M.E. Hobbs

Harold Abraham Scheraga (October 18, 1921 – August 1, 2020) was an American biophysicist and the George W. and Grace L. Todd Professor Emeritus in the chemistry department at Cornell University. Scheraga is regarded as a pioneer in protein biophysics and has been especially influential in the study of protein solvation and the hydrophobic effect as it relates to protein folding.

== Early life and education ==
Scheraga was born in 1921 in Brooklyn, New York and spent his early life in Monticello, New York. His father worked as a machinist and opened a business there. The family returned to Brooklyn in 1929 due to business losses following the 1929 Wall Street Crash and struggled economically through the Great Depression. As a high school student, Scheraga was interested in mathematics and especially in classics, which he intended to pursue in college, but exposure to physics during his education at the City College of New York convinced him to focus on physical chemistry. He received his bachelor's degree from CCNY in 1941 and his Ph.D. from Duke University in 1946. During his graduate work, he spent time on projects related to the US war effort in World War II as well as on his own research. While at Duke he worked with Fritz London, Paul Gross, and others. After graduation, he spent a year as a postdoctoral fellow at Harvard Medical School with John Edsall, where he first began to work with proteins.

== Academic career ==
Scheraga spent his entire academic career at Cornell University, beginning with an appointment as an instructor in 1947, becoming an associate professor in 1950, and eventually being promoted to full professor in 1958. As he later recalled, he was offered the instructor appointment by Peter Debye on the same day as his interview. He became the Todd Professor of Chemistry in 1965 and retired, assuming emeritus status, in 1992. Scheraga served as the department chair from 1960-67. Throughout his faculty career, Scheraga taught undergraduate courses in physical chemistry, as well as graduate courses focused more specifically on proteins.

== Research ==
Scheraga's research career was focused on protein biophysics, beginning in the 1940s when little was known about the subject. His work on protein solvation, the hydrophobic effect, and the consequences for protein folding was controversial in its early stages, but has been highly influential. He was also a significant contributor in theoretical and computational biophysics, developing statistical mechanical models for the hydrophobic effect and playing a key role in early molecular mechanics models of proteins, developing force fields for use in protein and peptide simulations. Most of his later work was focused on molecular dynamics simulations of proteins and protein folding, particularly as compared to NMR measurements.

== Personal life ==
Scheraga met his wife Miriam Kurnow, at the time a sociology student at Brooklyn College, through a Jewish social club in Brooklyn in which he participated during his time as a CCNY student. They married while Scheraga was at Duke, where Miriam briefly took a technician job in analytical chemistry to support the couple. She later worked in the Cornell University library. She died January 5, 2020. They had three children.

Scheraga died on August 1, 2020, at the age of 98.

== Awards and honors ==
Scheraga received numerous awards in recognition of his influence in the protein biophysics field.

- Guggenheim Fellow, 1956
- Eli Lilly Award in Biological Chemistry, 1957
- Fellow of the American Association for the Advancement of Science, 1966
- Member of the United States National Academy of Sciences, 1966
- Member of the American Academy of Arts and Sciences, 1967
- Repligen Corporation Award in Chemistry of Biological Processes, 1990
- Fellow of the Biophysical Society, 1999
