= Journey to the Alcarria =

- first English-language edition
- Author: Camilo José Cela
- Genre: travel book
- Publication date: 1948

Journey to the Alcarria (Spanish: Viaje a la Alcarria) is a travel book by the Spanish Nobel Prize-winning author Camilo José Cela. It was published in 1948.

Written in the third person, the book describes the author's travels in the Alcarria region of Spain. It has been described as "the most celebrated Spanish travelogue of all times". It was translated into English by Frances M. López-Morillas and published by the University of Wisconsin Press in 1964. In 1986, the author published a follow-up book called Nuevo viaje a la Alcarria.
