= Camilo José Cela Conde =

Spanish writer

The Most Illustrious The Marquess of Iria Flavia
- Born: Camilo José Arcadio Cela Conde; 17 January 1946 (age 80); Madrid, Spain
- Occupations: Novelist, writer, essayist, professor, researcher
- Spouse: Dr. Cristina Rincón Ruiz
- Children: Camila Cela Marty (b. 1989)
- Writing career
- Language: Spanish
- Notable awards: Fernando Quiñones Prize; Unicaja Prize

Camilo José Arcadio Cela Conde, 2nd Marquess of Iria Flavia (born 17 January 1946), is a Spanish writer. He is the son of Nobel Prize winning writer Camilo José Cela and is currently a Professor of Philosophy of law, Morality and Politics at the University of the Balearic Islands.

He published his first book El reto de los halcones in 1975, the same year he finished his degree in Philosophy.

In 1989 he published Cela, mi padre, a special dedication to his father who was awarded the Nobel Prize in Literature that same year.

In 2003 he became the Marquess of Iria Flavia.

Cela's arms as 2nd Marquess of Iria Flavia.

== Bibliography ==
- El reto de los halcones. Antología de la prensa apocalíptica española en la apertura (1975) ISBN 9788433490025
- Carlos Mensa, crónica de una realidad tangente (1975) ISBN 9788485253005
- Capitalismo y campesinado en la isla de Mallorca (1979) ISBN 9788432303586
- De genes, dioses y tiranos. La determinación biológica de la moral (1985) ISBN 9788420624228
- Cela, mi padre. La vida íntima y literaria de Camilo José Cela contada por su hijo (1989) ISBN 9788478800001
  (2002) ISBN 9788484601920
- Paisajes urbanos (1994) ISBN 9788487789144
- A fuego lento -with Koldo Royo & Horacio Sapere- (1999) ISBN 9788476517970
- Senderos de la evolución humana -with Francisco José Ayala Pereda- (2001) ISBN 9788420667829
- Como bestia que duerme (2004) ISBN 9788420645346
- Telón de sombras (2005) ISBN 9788420645889
- La profecía de Darwin. Del origen de la mente a la psicopatología -with Julio Sanjuan Arias- (2005) ISBN 9788497510905
- La piedra que se volvió palabra. Las claves evolutivas de la humanidad -with Francisco José Ayala Pereda- (2006) ISBN 9788420647838
- Hielos eternos. Un antropólogo en la Antártida (2009) ISBN 9788493563165
- El origen de la idea. Galápagos tras Darwin (2011) ISBN 9788493563141
- Evolución humana. El camino hacia nuestra especie -with Francisco José Ayala Pereda- (2013) ISBN 9788420678481
- Cela, piel adentro (2016) ISBN 9788423350902

== Ancestors ==
Ancestors of Camilo José Cela Conde

16. Antonio María Cela Pombo
8. Camilo Cela Fernández
17. Rosa Fernández Fernández
4. Camilo Crisanto Cela Fernández
18. Pedro Fernández
9. Teresa Fernández Fernández
19. Teresa Fernández
2. Camilo José Cela Trulock, 1st Marquess of Iria Flavia
20. Juan Trulock
10. Juan Trulock Glascott
21. Enriqueta Glascott
5. Camila Manuela Trulock Bertorini
22. Camilo Marcos Bertorini
11. Josefina Catalina Bertorini Jones
23. María Margarita Jones
1. Camilo José Cela Conde, 2nd Marquess of Iria Flavia
24. Damián Conde Gurrea
12. Valentín José Conde Navascués
25. Romualda Navascués Rodríguez
6. Arcadio Conde Otegui
26. Marcelino Otegui Aristizábal
13. Josefa Francisca Otegui Jáuregui
27. María de los Dolores Jáuregui Arámburu
3. María del Rosario Conde Picavea
28. Juan José Picavea Baquedano
14. Manuel María Picavea Miranda
29. Josefa Miranda Arozamena
7. Máxima Ignacia Picavea Leguía
30. Rafael María Leguía
15. María de la Concepción Leguía Dolagaray
31. Juana Bautista Dolagaray

Spanish nobility
| Preceded by Camilo José Cela Trulock | Marquess of Iria Flavia; 2003–present | Incumbent |
