= Francisco J. Ayala =

Spanish-American biologist and philosopher (1934–2023)

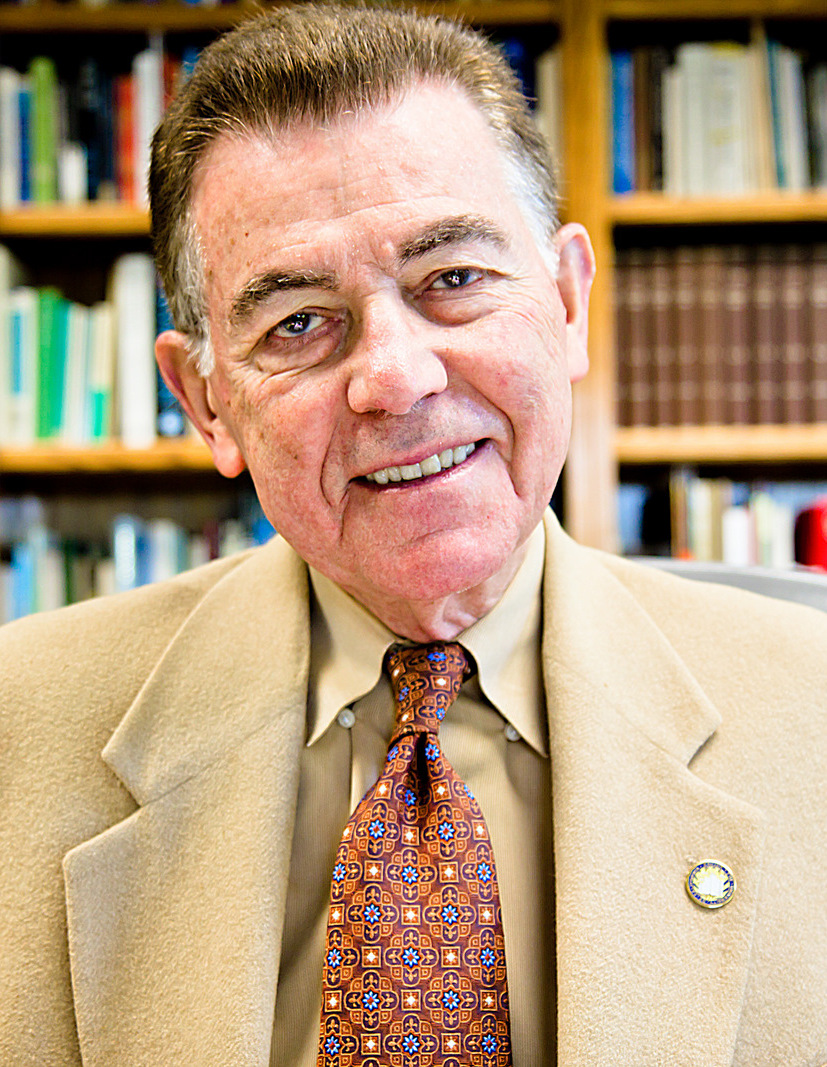
- Born: Francisco José Ayala Pereda; March 12, 1934; Madrid, Spain
- Died: March 5, 2023 (aged 88); Newport Beach, California, U.S.
- Citizenship: Spanish, American (1971–2023)
- Education: University of Salamanca; Columbia University
- Known for: Population genetics
- Spouses: Mary Henderson (m. 1968, divorced); Hana Lostokova (m. 1985)
- Children: 2
- Awards: National Medal of Science, Templeton Prize
- Scientific career
- Fields: Biology, Genetics
- Workplaces: University of California, Davis (1971–1989); University of California, Irvine (1989–2018)
- Doctoral advisor: Theodosius Dobzhansky
- Doctoral students: John Avise

Francisco José Ayala Pereda (March 12, 1934 – March 3, 2023) was a Spanish-American evolutionary biologist and philosopher who was a longtime faculty member at the University of California, Irvine, and University of California, Davis.

Ayala was previously president and chairman of the board of the American Association for the Advancement of Science. At University of California, Irvine, his academic appointments included University Professor and Donald Bren Professor of Biological Sciences, Ecology & Evolutionary Biology (School of Biological Sciences), Professor of Philosophy (School of Humanities), and Professor of Logic and the Philosophy of Science (School of Social Sciences).

Ayala's employment at UC Irvine ended in 2018 after the university issued a report relating to allegations of sexual harassment claims against him. Ayala denied having "intentionally caused sexual harassment to anybody." His name was removed from the School of Biological Sciences, the Science Library, as well as various graduate fellowships, scholarship programs, and endowed chairs.

== Early life and education ==
Earlier in life, Ayala was a Dominican priest, ordained in 1960 and leaving the priesthood that same year. After graduating from the University of Salamanca, he moved to the United States in 1961 to study for a PhD at Columbia University. There, he studied for his doctorate under Theodosius Dobzhansky, graduating in 1964. He became a US citizen in 1971.

== Career ==
Ayala is known for his research on population and evolutionary genetics, and has been called the "Renaissance Man of Evolutionary Biology". His "discoveries have opened up new approaches to the prevention and treatment of diseases that affect hundreds of millions of individuals worldwide", including demonstrating that the reproduction of Trypanosoma cruzi, the agent of Chagas disease, is mostly the product of cloning, and that only a few clones account for most of this widespread disease.

Ayala served on the advisory board of the now defunct Campaign to Defend the Constitution, an organization that has lobbied in support of the separation of church and state. He has been publicly critical of U.S. restrictions on federal funding of embryonic stem cell research. He was also a critic of intelligent design theories, claiming that they are not only pseudoscience, but also misunderstood from a theological point of view. He suggested that the theory of evolution resolves the problem of evil, thus being a kind of theodicy. Although Ayala generally did not discuss his religious views, he has stated that "science is compatible with religious faith in a personal, omnipotent and benevolent God." He also briefly served, in 1960, as a Dominican priest. Ayala did not say whether he remained a religious believer, not wanting to be "tagged by one side or the other." Ayala served as an expert witness in McLean v. Arkansas Board of Education, a court case that overturned the mandatory teaching of creationism alongside evolution in grade school science classes.

Ayala attended the Beyond Belief symposium in November 2006. Ayala debated Christian apologist William Lane Craig in November 2009 on the topic of intelligent design.

On October 18, 2011, the University of California, Irvine (UCI) announced that Ayala would be donating $10 million to the university's School of Biological Sciences. The gift was to be "$1 million a year for the next decade."

== Sexual harassment investigation ==
Four women (professor Kathleen Treseder, another professor, an assistant dean, and one graduate student), alleged that Ayala had sexually harassed them, prompting an investigation led by Erik Pelowitz at UC Irvine's Office of Equal Opportunity and Diversity. The university investigators concluded that Ayala violated the university's policies on sexual harassment and sex discrimination in the cases of three of the four women, and found that the conduct at issue extended to 2004 and had led to previous warnings to Ayala. The investigators' report also concluded that Ayala "engaged in a campaign with the highest University officials to influence the outcome of this investigation." Ayala denied most allegations against him, and wrote to the university's chancellor, Howard Gillman, "I have never intentionally caused sexual harassment to anybody. To the extent that my actions may have caused harm to others ... I apologize from the deepest of my heart and of my mind." He resigned effective July 1, 2018.

Ayala was represented in the investigation by attorney Susan Estrich. The investigation against Ayala extended to more than 60 witnesses, and the outcome divided scholars. Camilo José Cela Conde and Elizabeth Loftus defended him, the latter saying that she was "shocked that this man's life was ruined over this collection of reactions to his behavior" and described the allegations as "thin." In contrast, T. Jane Zelikova, the founder of 500 Women Scientists, supported Ayala's ouster. Ann Olivarius, a lawyer and sexual harassment expert who reviewed the report at the request of Science magazine, said that Ayala did not "have sex with students or pressure them directly for sex" but "clearly made multiple women feel degraded" and continued to do so "after senior university officials warned him to stop acting in these ways."

Ayala returned to his private life, and the university removed his name from the School of Biological Sciences, the Science Library, and endowed chairs that had been named after Ayala. The American Association for the Advancement of Science removed his fellowship status. The U.S. National Academy of Sciences rescinded Ayala's membership for violation of Section 4 of the NAS Code of Conduct, effective June 23, 2021.

== Awards and honors ==
In 2001, Ayala was awarded the National Medal of Science. On April 13, 2007, he was awarded the first of 100 bicentennial medals at Mount Saint Mary's University for lecturing there as the first presenter for the Bicentennial Distinguished Lecture Series. His lecture was entitled "The Biological Foundations of Morality". Other awards he received include the Gold Honorary Gregor Mendel Medal of the Czech Academy of Sciences, the Gold Medal of the Accademia Nazionale dei Lincei, the Gold Medal of the Stazione Zoologica in Naples, the President's Award of the American Institute of Biological Sciences, the AAAS Award for Scientific Freedom and Responsibility and 150th Anniversary Leadership Medal of the AAAS, the Medal of the College of France, the UCI Medal of the University of California, the 1998 Distinguished Scientist Award from the SACNAS, and Sigma Xi's William Procter Prize for Scientific Achievement, 2000. In 2010, he was awarded the Templeton Prize. The science library at UCI was named after him from 2010 until 2018, when his name was removed after a university investigation concluded that his conduct with respect to three women violated university policies. Ayala delivered a lecture at the Trotter Prize ceremony in 2011 entitled "Darwin's Gift to Science and Religion." In 2014, UCI named its School of Biological Sciences the Francisco J. Ayala School of Biological Sciences after Ayala. UCI removed his name from the library and school in 2018, after finding that he sexually harassed at least four women.

Ayala was elected a Fellow of the American Academy of Arts and Sciences in 1977, and the National Academy of Sciences in 1980, though his fellowship status in these institutions was later revoked. He was a member of the American Philosophical Society. He was also a foreign member of the Russian Academy of Sciences, the Accademia Nazionale dei Lincei in Rome, the Spanish Royal Academy of Sciences, the Mexican Academy of Sciences, and the Serbian Academy of Sciences and Arts. He had honorary degrees from the University of Athens, the University of Bologna, the University of Barcelona, the University of the Balearic Islands, the University of León, the University of Madrid, the University of Salamanca, the University of Valencia, the University of Vigo, Far Eastern National University, Masaryk University and University of Warsaw.

== Personal life ==
Francisco Ayala was born to Francisco Ayala and Soledad Pereda. In the late 1960s he met Mary Henderson, they married on May 27, 1968. They had two sons: Francisco José (born 1969) and Carlos Alberto (born 1972). Their marriage ended in divorce, and in 1985 he married an ecologist named Hana Ayala (née Lostáková, born 1956). They lived in Irvine, California. He died from a heart attack on March 3, 2023, in Newport Beach, at age 88.

== Books ==
Ayala has published 950 publications and 30 books. Recently published books include:

- Ayala, F.J. Evolution, Explanation, Ethics and Aesthetics: Towards a Philosophy of Biology. Academic Press: 2016. ISBN 9780128036938
- Ayala, F.J. Am I a Monkey: Six Big Questions About Evolution. Johns Hopkins University Press: Baltimore, MD, US 2010.
- Ayala, F.J. and Robert Arp, eds. Contemporary Debates in Philosophy of Biology. Wiley-Blackwell: London, 2009. ISBN 978-1-4051-5998-2
- Avise, J.C. and F.J. Ayala, eds. In the Light of Evolution: Adaptation and Complex Design. National Academy Press: Washington, DC. 2007. ISBN 978-0-309-10405-0
- Cela Conde, C.J. and F.J. Ayala. Human Evolution. Trails from the Past. Oxford University Press: Oxford, 2007.
- Ayala, F.J. Darwin y el Diseño Inteligente. Creacionismo, Cristianismo y Evolución. Alianza Editorial: Madrid, Spain, 231 pp. 2007.
- Ayala, F.J. Darwin's Gift to Science and Religion. Joseph Henry Press: Washington, DC, xi + 237 pp. 2007
- Ayala, F.J. La Evolución de un Evolucionista. Escritos Seleccionados. University of Valencia: Valencia, Spain, 441 pp. 2006. ISBN 84-370-6526-7
- Ayala, F.J. Darwin and Intelligent Design. Fortress Press: Minneapolis, MN, xi + 116 pp. 2006.
- Ayala, F.J. and C.J. Cela Conde. La piedra que se volvió palabra. Las claves evolutivas de la humanidad. Alianza Editorial: Madrid, Spain. 184 pp. 2006 ISBN 84-206-4783-7
- Hey, J., W.M. Fitch and F.J. Ayala, eds. Systematics and the Origin of Species. On Ernst Mayr's 100th Anniversary. National Academies Press: Washington, DC. xiii + 367 pp. 2005 ISBN 0-309-09536-0
- Wuketits, F.M. and F.J. Ayala, eds. Handbook of Evolution: The Evolution of Living Systems (Including Hominids), Volume 2. Wiley-VCH: Weinheim, Germany. 292 pp. 2005. ISBN 978-3-527-61971-9
- Ayala, F.J. Le Ragioni dell’ Evoluzione. Di Renzo Editore: Rome. 109 pp. 2005.
- Ayala, F.J. Human Evolution: Biology, Culture, Ethics. In: J.B. Miller, ed., The Epic of Evolution. Science and Religion in Dialogue (Pearson Education, Inc.: Upper Saddle River, New Jersey), pp. 166–180. 2004.

== See also ==
- List of celebrities who own wineries and vineyards

Cultural offices
Preceded by Eloise E. Clark	President of the American Association for the Advancement of Science; 1995	Succeeded by Rita R. Colwell
