= Marquess of Iria Flavia =

Marquessate of Iria Flavia
- Creation date: 17 May 1996
- Created by: Juan Carlos I of Spain
- Peerage: Spanish nobility
- First holder: Camilo José Cela Trulock
- Present holder: Camilo José Cela Conde
- Heir apparent: Camila Cela Marty
- Remainder to: Heirs of the body of the grantee
- Motto: El que resiste gana ("He who resists wins")

Marquess of Iria Flavia (Spanish: Marquesado de Iria Flavia) is a hereditary title in the Spanish nobility. This marquessate was bestowed by Juan Carlos I of Spain by Royal Decree 1137/1996, on 17 May 1996 on the author and Nobel laureate, Camilo José Cela Trulock, in recognition of his contribution to literature and the Spanish language. The title recalls the Celtiberian port of Iria Flavia in Galicia, northwestern Spain, where Cela was born and is now buried.

The current holder of the title is his only child, Camilo José Cela Conde.

== Holders ==
- Camilo José Cela Trulock, 1st Marquess of Iria Flavia (1996–2002).
- Camilo José Cela Conde, 2nd Marquess of Iria Flavia (2003–).

The heiress apparent and the only person in line of succession to the marquessate is the present holder's only child, his daughter, Camila Cela Marty (b. 1989).
