= Eloise E. Clark =

American biologist (1931–2017)

President of the American Association for the Advancement of Science
- In office 1994
- Preceded by: F. Sherwood Rowland
- Succeeded by: Francisco J. Ayala

Personal details
- Born: 1931 Abingdon, Virginia, U.S.
- Died: May 10, 2017 (aged 85–86)
- Education: University of Virginia; University of North Carolina at Chapel Hill (PhD)
- Occupation: Biologist

Eloise Elizabeth "Betsy" Clark (1931 – 10 May 2017) was an American biologist, best known for her long service (1969–1983) as assistant director for Biological, Behavioral, and Social Sciences at the U.S. National Science Foundation.

Born in Abingdon, Virginia, Betsy was the daughter of Dr. Frank and Ava Clark of Abingdon, and was the youngest of seven children, hence her family nickname, Bitsy. Her father established a Presbyterian mission school in Grundy, Virginia, where Betsy was born, and the importance of education was imbued in the family. Her childhood on the family farm and her love of nature led to her lifelong passion for science. Clark graduated from Mary Washington College of the University of Virginia. Her Ph.D. (1958) in developmental biology is from the University of North Carolina, Chapel Hill. She was a postdoctoral fellow at Washington University in St. Louis and at the University of California, Berkeley.

Clark taught at Columbia University from 1960 to 1969 as the first woman appointed to the biology faculty. A desire to try a different career in management while remaining close to science then brought her to the National Science Foundation. In her roles at NSF, she helped shape national science policy serving in positions of increasing responsibility, until her resignation as assistant director of Biological, Behavioral and Social Sciences in 1982.

Subsequent to her years at NSF, Clark was provost and vice president for academic affairs at Bowling Green State University, positions which she held until 1996. In 1994 she served as president of the American Association for the Advancement of Science.

Cultural offices
Preceded by F. Sherwood Rowland	President of the American Association for the Advancement of Science; 1994	Succeeded by Francisco J. Ayala
