= President of the American Association for the Advancement of Science =

Head of international nonprofit organization

Presidents of the American Association for the Advancement of Science (AAAS, founded in 1848) serve a one-year term, beginning in mid-February at the close of the AAAS Annual Meeting. In accordance with the convention used by the AAAS, presidents are referenced based on the year in which they left office. The presidential term is preceded by a one-year term as president-elect, and followed by a one-year term as chair of the AAAS Board of Directors.

== List of presidents ==
- 1848: William C. Redfield
- 1849: Joseph Henry
- 1850: Alexander Dallas Bache
- 1851: Louis Agassiz
- 1852: Benjamin Peirce
- 1853: Presidency Vacant
- 1854: James D. Dana
- 1855: John Torrey
- 1856: James Hall
- 1857: Alexis Caswell
- 1857: Jacob Whitman Bailey
- 1858: Jeffries Wyman
- 1859: Stephen Alexander
- 1860: Isaac Lea
- 1861-5: Presidency vacant
- 1866: F. A. P. Barnard
- 1867: J. S. Newberry
- 1868: Benjamin A. Gould
- 1869: J. W. Foster
- 1870: T. Sterry Hunt
- 1870: William Chauvenet
- 1871: Asa Gray
- 1872: J. Lawrence Smith
- 1873: Joseph Lovering
- 1874: John L. LeConte
- 1875: Julius Erasmus Hilgard
- 1876: William B. Rogers
- 1877: Simon Newcomb
- 1878: Othniel Charles Marsh
- 1879: George F. Barker
- 1880: Lewis H. Morgan
- 1881: George J. Brush
- 1882: J. W. Dawson
- 1883: Charles A. Young
- 1884: J. P. Lesley
- 1885: H. A. Newton
- 1886: Edward S. Morse
- 1887: Samuel P. Langley
- 1888: John Wesley Powell
- 1889: T. C. Mendenhall
- 1890: George L. Goodale
- 1891: Albert B. Prescott
- 1892: Joseph LeConte
- 1893: William Harkness
- 1894: Daniel G. Brinton
- 1895: Edward W. Morley
- 1896: Theodore Gill
- 1896: Edward Drinker Cope
- 1897: Oliver Wolcott Gibbs
- 1897: W J McGee (Acting President)
- 1898: Frederic Ward Putnam
- 1899: Grove Karl Gilbert
- 1899: Marcus Benjamin
- 1899: Edward Francis Orton
- 1900: R. S. Woodward
- 1901: Charles S. Minot
- 1902: Ira Remsen
- 1902: Asaph Hall
- 1903: Carroll D. Wright
- 1904: W. G. Farlow
- 1905: Calvin M. Woodward
- 1906: William H. Welch
- 1907: E. L. Nichols
- 1908: Thomas C. Chamberlin
- 1909: David Starr Jordan
- 1910: Albert A. Michelson
- 1911: Charles E. Bessey
- 1912: E. C. Pickering
- 1913: Edmund B. Wilson
- 1914: Charles W. Eliot
- 1915: William Wallace Campbell
- 1916: Charles R. Van Hise
- 1917: Theodore W. Richards
- 1918: John Merle Coulter
- 1919: Simon Flexner
- 1920: Leland O. Howard
- 1921: Eliakim H. Moore
- 1922: J. Playfair McMurrich
- 1923: Charles D. Walcott
- 1924: James McKeen Cattell
- 1925: Michael I. Pupin
- 1926: Liberty Hyde Bailey
- 1927: Arthur Amos Noyes
- 1928: Henry F. Osborn
- 1929: Robert A. Millikan
- 1930: Thomas H. Morgan
- 1931: Franz Boas
- 1932: John Jacob Abel
- 1933: Henry N. Russell
- 1934: Edward L. Thorndike
- 1935: Karl T. Compton
- 1936: Edwin G. Conklin
- 1937: George D. Birkhoff
- 1938: Wesley C. Mitchell
- 1939: Walter B. Cannon
- 1940: Albert F. Blakeslee
- 1941: Irving Langmuir
- 1942: Arthur H. Compton
- 1943: Isaiah Bowman
- 1944: Anton J. Carlson
- 1945: James B. Conant
- 1946: C. F. Kettering
- 1947: Harlow Shapley
- 1948: Edmund Ware Sinnott
- 1949: Elvin C. Stakman
- 1950: Roger Adams
- 1951: Kirtley Fletcher Mather
- 1952: Detlev W. Bronk
- 1953: Edward U. Condon
- 1954: Warren Weaver
- 1955: George W. Beadle
- 1956: Paul B. Sears
- 1957: Laurence H. Snyder
- 1958: Wallace R. Brode
- 1959: Paul E. Klopsteg
- 1960: Chauncey D. Leake
- 1961: Thomas Park
- 1962: Paul M. Gross
- 1963: Alan T. Waterman
- 1964: Laurence M. Gould
- 1965: Henry Eyring
- 1966: Alfred S. Romer
- 1967: Don K. Price
- 1968: Walter Orr Roberts
- 1969: H. Bentley Glass
- 1970: Athelstan Spilhaus
- 1971: Mina Rees
- 1972: Glenn T. Seaborg
- 1973: Leonard M. Rieser
- 1974: Roger Revelle
- 1975: Margaret Mead
- 1976: William D. McElroy
- 1977–1978: Emilio Q. Daddario
- 1979: Edward E. David Jr.
- 1980: Kenneth E. Boulding
- 1981: Frederick Mosteller
- 1982: D. Allan Bromley
- 1983: E. Margaret Burbidge
- 1984: Anna J. Harrison
- 1985: David A. Hamburg
- 1986: Gerard Piel
- 1987: Lawrence Bogorad
- 1988: Sheila E. Widnall
- 1989: Walter E. Massey
- 1990: Richard C. Atkinson
- 1991: Donald N. Langenberg
- 1992: Leon M. Lederman
- 1993: F. Sherwood Rowland
- 1994: Eloise E. Clark
- 1995: Francisco J. Ayala
- 1996: Rita R. Colwell
- 1997: Jane Lubchenco
- 1998: Mildred S. Dresselhaus
- 1999: M. R. C. Greenwood
- 2000: Stephen Jay Gould
- 2001: Mary L. Good
- 2002: Peter H. Raven
- 2003: Floyd E. Bloom
- 2004: Mary Ellen Avery
- 2005: Shirley Ann Jackson
- 2006: Gilbert S. Omenn
- 2007: John Holdren
- 2008: David Baltimore
- 2009: James J. McCarthy
- 2010: Peter Agre
- 2011: Alice S. Huang
- 2012: Nina Fedoroff
- 2013: William H. Press
- 2014: Phillip A. Sharp
- 2015: Gerald Fink
- 2016: Geraldine L. Richmond
- 2017: Barbara A. Schaal
- 2018: Susan Hockfield
- 2019: Margaret Hamburg
- 2020: Steven Chu
- 2021: Claire Fraser
- 2022: Gilda A. Barabino
- 2023: Keith Yamamoto
- 2024: Willie E. May
- 2025: Theresa A. Maldonado

Notes:

- Jacob Whitman Bailey died on 26 February 1857, at the beginning of his term of office as Association President.
- Between 1861 and 1865 the American Civil War created political pressures that led to the indefinite postponement of all AAAS events during that period. See AAAS history for more information.
