= Erwin Kempton Mapes =

Erwin Kempton Mapes (9 June 1884 – 18 February 1961) was an American scholar of Spanish-American literature and Hispanist, renowned for his work on the Hispanic Modernists.

Born in Gilman, Illinois, Mapes received his bachelors from Cornell College in Mount Vernon, Iowa, in 1909. He then went to Harvard University and studied Hispanic Studies under Jeremiah D. M. Ford, receiving his master's in 1915. He received his doctorate from the University of Paris with a study on Rubén Darío, published in 1925 as L'influence française dans l'oeuvre de Rubén Darío.

Before receiving his doctorate, Mapes taught at various small colleges including Western State College of Colorado in Gunnison. Afterwards, in 1925, he was appointed as an associate professor at the State University of Iowa, where he taught until his retirement. He was made Professor (full professor) in 1937.

During his life he concentrated his study of literary criticism on Rubén Darío, Manuel Gutiérrez Nájera and Modernism in Spanish-American literature. He was for many years considered the highest authority in these subjects. Almost all of his work was published in American and French journals. He also published a few textbooks, such as Y va de cuento (1943), in collaboration with Juan López-Morillas (who married his daughter Frances, who would become an important Spanish-English translator). In 1958 he published a critical edition of Cuentos completos y otras narraciones of Manuel Gutiérrez Nájera.
