= Christ Versus Arizona =

1988 novel by Camilo José Cela

- Author: Camilo José Cela
- Original title: Cristo versus Arizona
- Translator: Martin Sokolinsky
- Language: Spanish
- Publisher: Seix Barral
- Publication date: 1988
- Publication place: Spain
- English publication date: 2007
- Pages: 238
- ISBN: 9788432205828

Christ Versus Arizona (Spanish: Cristo versus Arizona) is a 1988 Western novel by the Spanish writer Camilo José Cela.

== Plot ==
The book is set in the American Old West during the gunfight at the O.K. Corral in 1881. It consists of a monologue in one long sentence, inside the head of Wendell Liverpool Espana, who is the son of a prostitute and observes the gunfight.

== Reception ==
Publishers Weekly wrote that the book creates "a vivid and frequently grotesque picture of the American Southwest", full of "graphic depictions of racism, murder and death". The critic called it a significant addition to Cela's work that is "not for the faint of heart".
