= Villalba del Rey =

Villalba del Rey, Spain
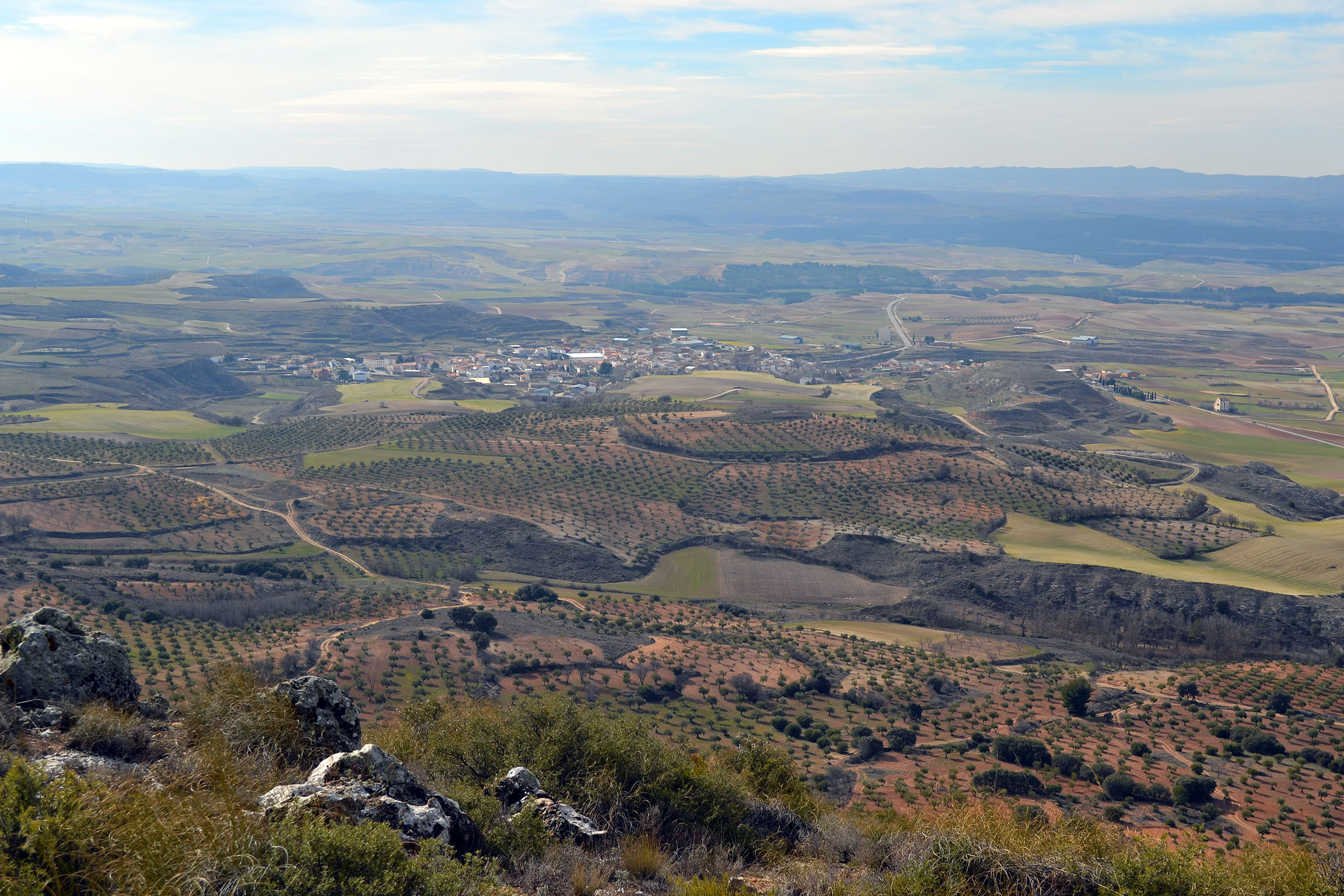

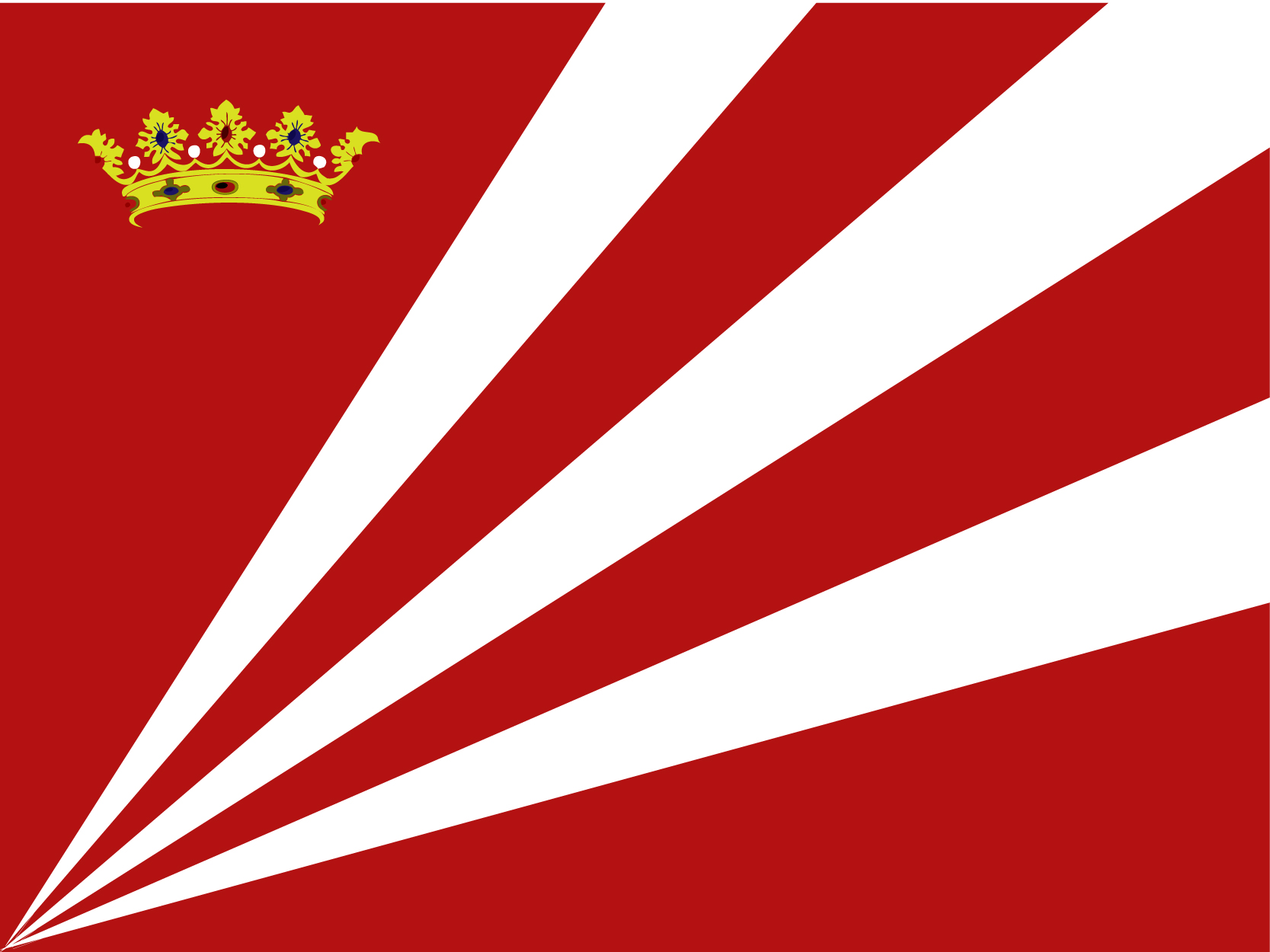
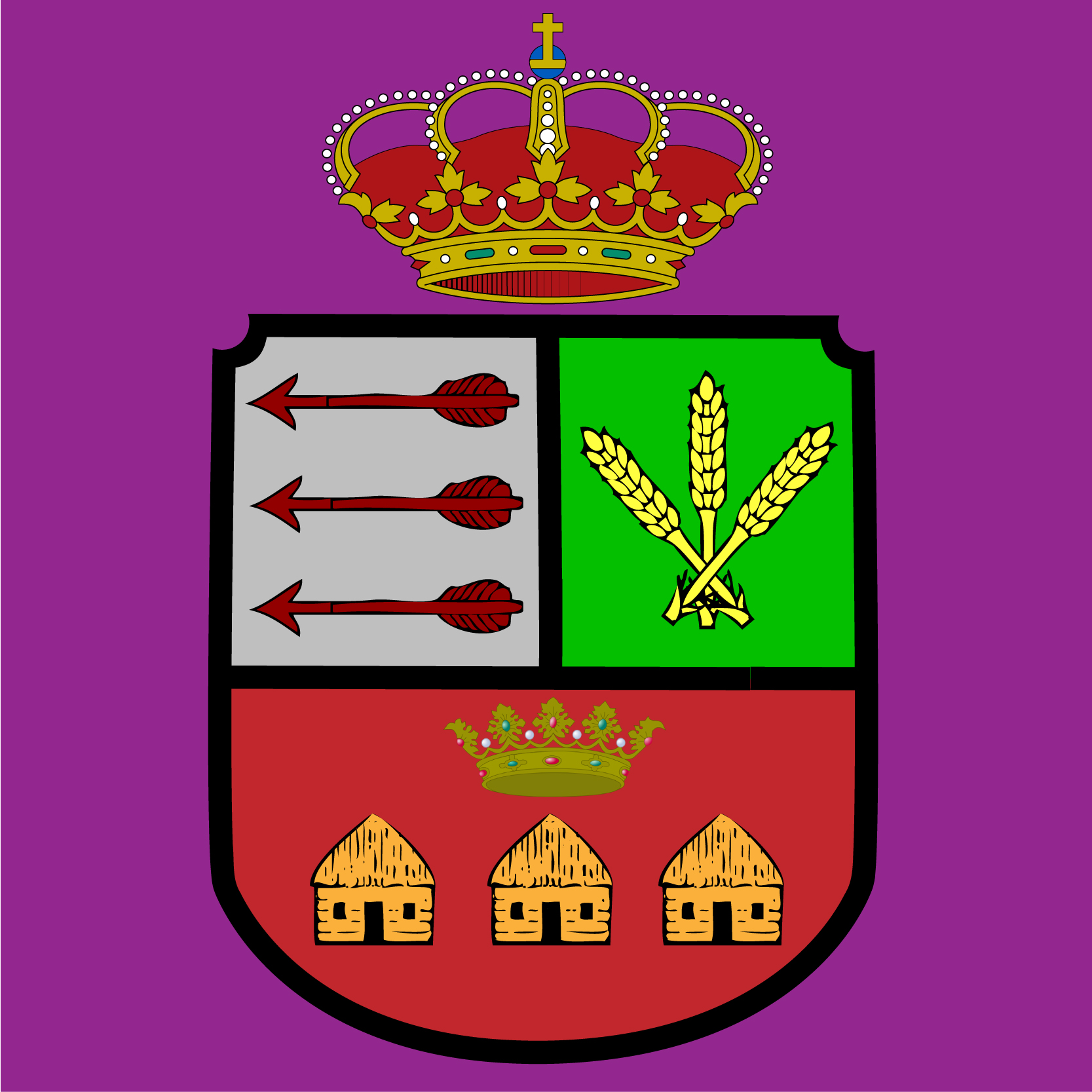
- Flag Seal Coat of arms

- Coordinates: 40°21′N 2°38′W
- Country: Spain
- Autonomous community: Castile-La Mancha
- Province: Cuenca
- Municipality: Villalba del Rey

Area
  - Total: 95 km^{2} (37 sq mi)
- Elevation: 791 m (2,595 ft)

Population (2025-01-01)
  - Total: 468
  - Density: 4.9/km^{2} (13/sq mi)
- Time zone: UTC+1 (CET)
  - Summer (DST): UTC+2 (CEST)

Villalba del Rey is a municipality located in the province of Cuenca, Castile-La Mancha, Spain. It is part of the natural region of La Alcarria. According to the 2004 census (INE), the municipality has a population of 662 inhabitants.

- Formerly known as Villalba de Huete, it became independent in 1411 and acquired its present name.
- Local economy is based in agriculture, sheep husbandry and beekeeping; with the main produce being cereals, olive oil, sunflower oil, honey and wine.

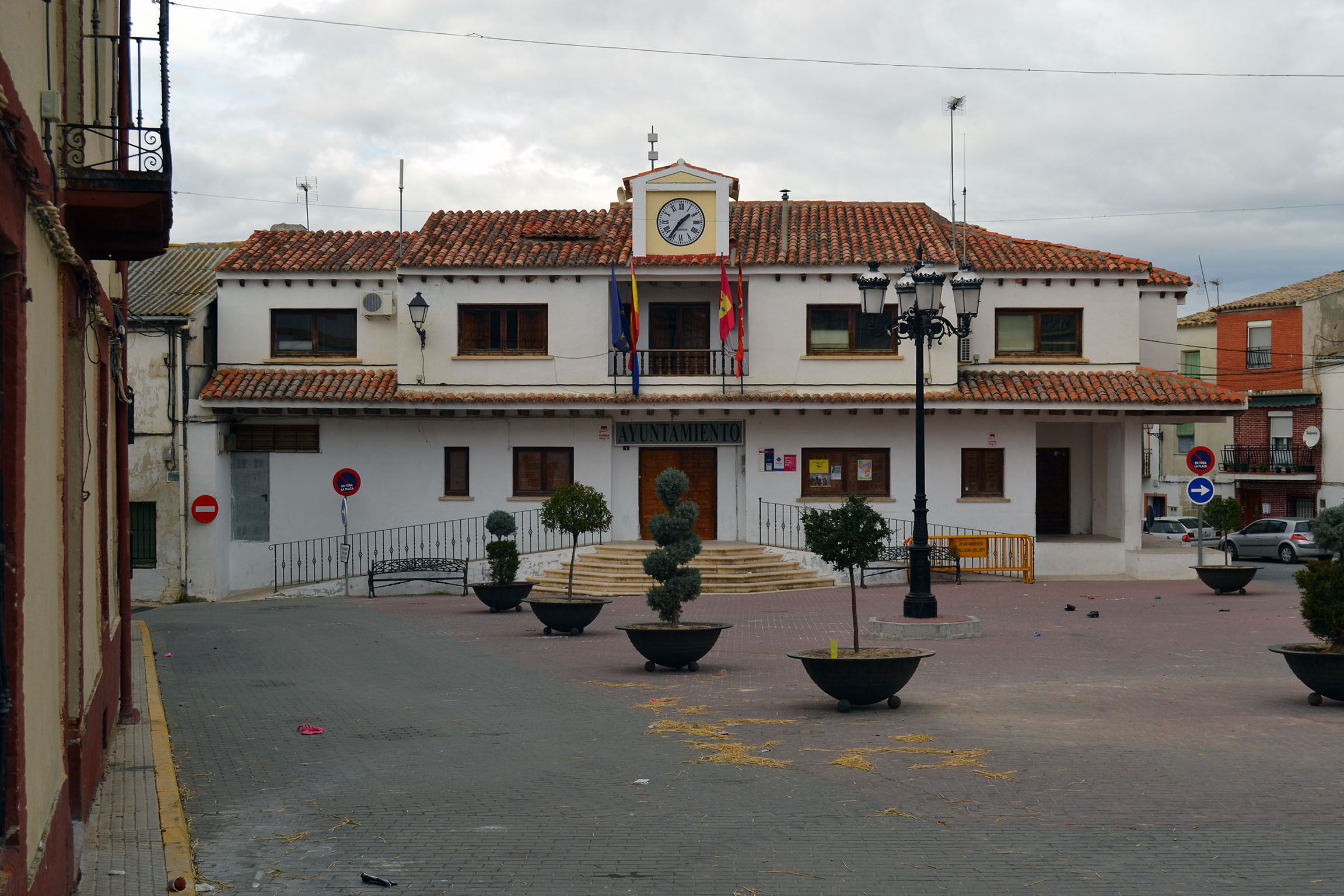
Ayuntamiento de Villalba del Rey

== Main buildings ==
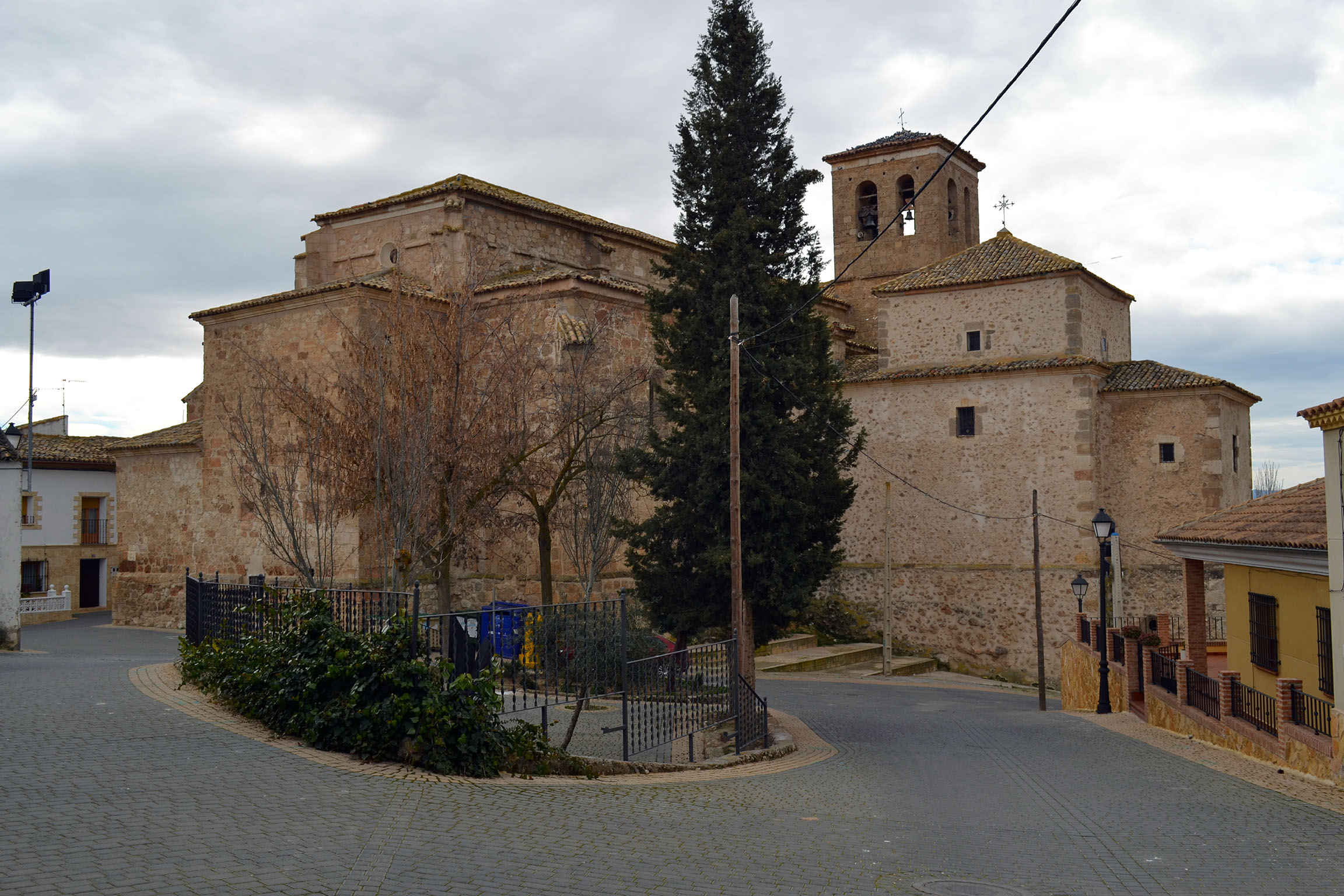
Iglesia de Nuestra Señora de la Asunción (Villalba del Rey, Cuenca)

- Immaculate Conception Hermitage: Simple gothic hermitage with square base.
- Assumption of Mary Church:Church of three naves and latin cross base from the 16th and 17th centuries. Inside, baroque altarpiece from the 18th century.

== Local holidays and folklore ==
- Saint Sebastian: January 20.
- Holy Week: Traditional processions of Maundy Thursday, the Gathering and Good Friday.
- Saint Isidore the Laborer: May 15.
- Nuestra Señora de los Portentos: First Sunday in September.
