= George Frederick Barker =

American scientist (1835–1910)

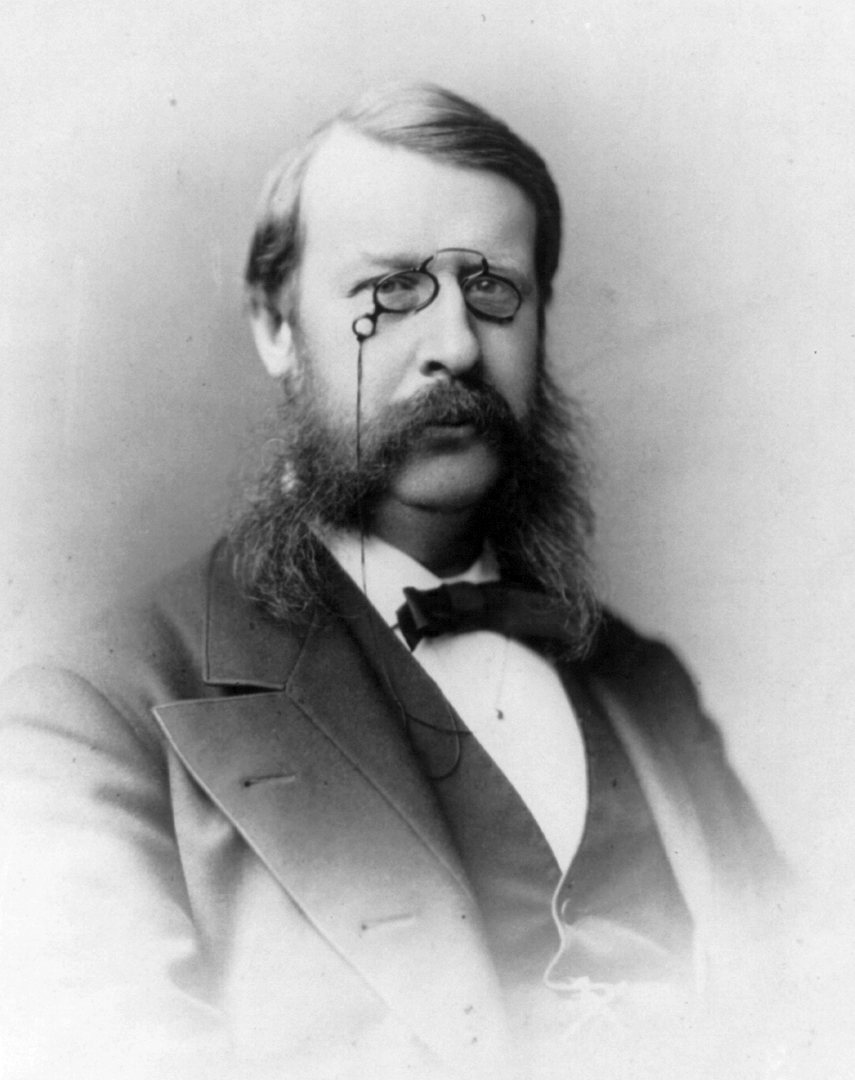
- Born: 1835 7 14; Charlestown, Massachusetts
- Died: 1910 5 24
- Occupations: American, physicist, and scientist

George Frederick Barker (July 14, 1835, in Charlestown, Massachusetts – May 24, 1910) was an American physician and scientist.

== Life and History ==
He graduated from the Yale Scientific School in 1858. He was successively chemical assistant in Harvard Medical School in 1858–1859 and 1860–1861, professor of chemistry and geology in Wheaton (Ill.) College. In 1864 he became the Professor of Natural Science at the Western University of Pennsylvania, now known as the University of Pittsburgh, where he undertook experiments to produce electric light by passing the current through a resisting filament which he claimed was "the first steady electric light generated in Pittsburgh, if not in the country". He subsequently went to Yale as a professor of physiological chemistry and toxicology, and later was a professor of physics at the University of Pennsylvania, in 1879–1900, when he became emeritus professor. He served as president of the American Association for the Advancement of Science in 1879; president of the American Chemical Society; vice-president of the American Philosophical Society (elected 1873) for 10 years; a member of the United States Electrical Commission; and for several years an associate editor of the American Journal of Science. He lectured in many cities and wrote a Text-Book of Elementary Chemistry (1870); a Physics (1892); and more.

In a history of the University of Pennsylvania published upon its bicentennial in 1940, the historian Edward Potts Cheyney recalled the piecemeal entry of women into the university, initially as auditors only, and noted, as Cheyney himself witnessed, that "in the lectures on physics in 1881 two young women sat meekly in a distant corner while Professor Barker was describing the new inventions of the electric light and telephone."
