= San Camilo, 1936 =

1969 novel by Camilo José Cela

- Author: Camilo José Cela
- Original title: Vísperas, festividad y octava de San Camilo del año 1936 en Madrid
- Translator: J. H. R. Polt
- Language: Spanish
- Publisher: Alfaguara
- Publication date: 1969
- Publication place: Spain
- English publication date: 1991
- Pages: 443

San Camilo, 1936: The Eve, Feast, and Octave of St. Camillus of the year 1936 in Madrid (Spanish: Vísperas, festividad y octava de San Camilo del año 1936 en Madrid) is a 1969 novel by the Spanish writer Camilo José Cela. It is about a large cast of characters in a Madrid neighbourhood during 10 days in July 1936, right at the start of the Spanish Civil War.

The New York Times called it "a Spanish Civil War novel that vehemently rejects the seductive facility of partisanship". Kirkus Reviews wrote that it "may be Cela's bitterly flowing masterpiece".
