= Frances M. López-Morillas =

American translator (1918–2018)

Frances López-Morillas (née Frances Elinor Mapes; September 3, 1918 – November 6, 2018) was an American translator of Spanish-language literature into English.

== Biography ==
Frances Elinor Mapes was born in Fulton, Missouri, and raised in Iowa City, Iowa, as the daughter of Erwin Kempton Mapes, who was also a prominent scholar of Spanish-language literature. She was married to the noted Hispanic scholar Juan López-Morillas from 1937 until his death in 1997.

She translated 23 Spanish literary and scholarly books, including works by Pérez Galdós, Camilo José Cela, Miguel Delibes, and Jorge Luis Borges. She also taught at the Wheeler School in Providence, Rhode Island, where she died at the age of 100 on November 6, 2018.

== Translations ==
- C.J. Cela, Journey to the Alcarria: Travels through the Spanish Countryside, 1964
- J. Marias, Miguel de Unamuno, 1966
- J.V. Vives, An Economic History of Spain, 1969
- J. Marias, Jose Ortega y Gasset: Circumstance and Vocation, 1970
- Spain in the Fifteenth Century, ed. by R. Highfield, 1972
- A. Boulton, Cruz Diez, 1974
- A. Boulton, Soto, 1974
- A. de Orsua y Vela, Tales of Potosi, 1975
- A. Boulton, Art in Aboriginal Venezuelan Ceramics, 1978
- J. Lopez-Morillas, The Krausist Movement and Ideological Change in Spain, 1981
- F. Savater, Childhood Regained, 1981
- M. Delibes, The Hedge, 1983
- J.L. Borges, Nine Essays on Dante, 1984
- B.P. Galdos, Torquemada, 1986
- M. Delibes, Five Hours with Mario, 1988
- C.M. Gaite, Behind the Curtains, 1990
- M. Delibes, The Stuff of Heroes, 1990
- J. Marias, Understanding Spain, 1990
- L. Weckmann, The Medieval Heritage of Mexico, 1992
- A.N. Cabeza de Vaca, Castaways: The Narrative of Alvar Nunez Cabeza de Vaca, edited by E. Pupo-Walker, 1993
- Selected Writings of Andrés Bello, ed. by I. Jaksic, 1997
- J. de Acosta, Natural and Moral History of the Indies (1590), 2002
