= Sacedón =

- Municipality
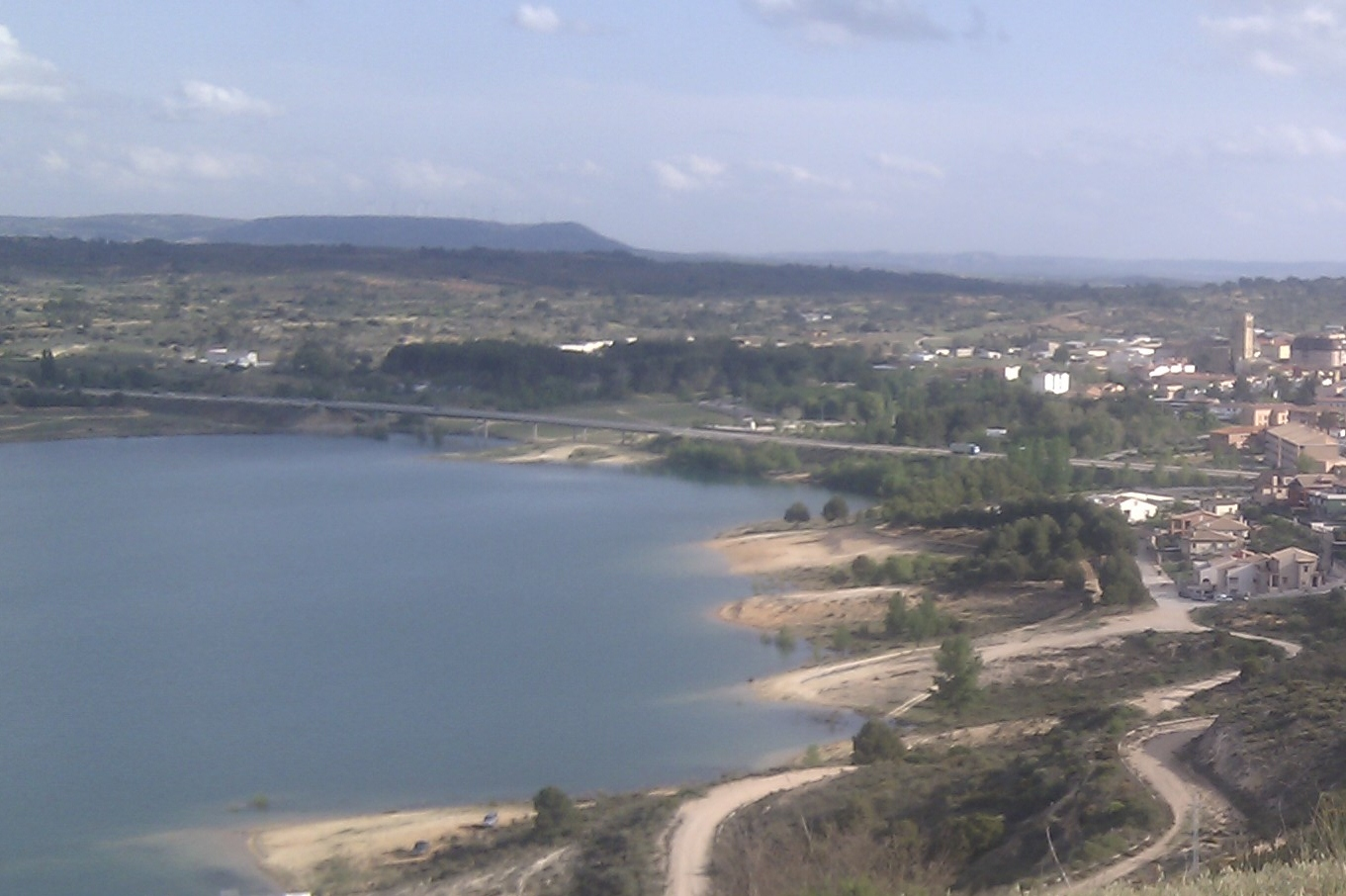

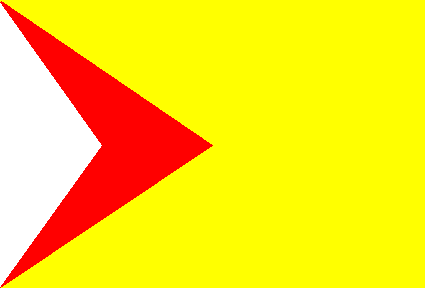
- Flag Coat of arms

- Location in Spain Sacedón (Castilla-La Mancha) Sacedón (Spain)
- Coordinates: 40°28′56″N 2°43′54″W
- Country: Spain
- Autonomous community: Castile-La Mancha
- Province: Guadalajara
- Judicial district: Guadalajara

Government
  - Alcalde: Ángel Román Escamilla Corral (2007)

Area
  - Total: 113.28 km^{2} (43.74 sq mi)
- Elevation: 740 m (2,430 ft)

Population (2025-01-01)
  - Total: 1,623
  - Density: 14.33/km^{2} (37.11/sq mi)
- Demonym: Sacedonense o sacedonero-a
- Time zone: UTC+1 (CET)
  - Summer (DST): UTC+2 (CEST)
- Postal code: 19120
- Official language(s): Spanish

Sacedón is a city located in the province of Guadalajara, Castile-La Mancha, Spain. According to the 2007 census, the city has a population of 1.758 inhabitants.
