= Paul Magnus Gross =

American chemist (1895 - 1986)

Paul M. Gross

Paul Magnus Gross, Sr. (September 15, 1895 – May 4, 1986) was an American chemist and educator at Duke University.

== Early life ==
Gross was born on September 15, 1895.

== Education ==
Gross received a B.S. degree from City College of New York in 1916, and M.S. and Ph.D. degrees from Columbia University in 1917 and 1919.

== Career ==
In 1919, Gross started his career as an assistant professor of chemistry (1919-1920) at Duke University. Gross was quickly promoted to full professor and served as chair of the chemistry department from 1921 to 1948.

In 1947, Gross became the Dean of the Graduate School (1947-1952), Dean of the University (1952-1958), and Vice-President in the Educational Division (1949-1960).

Gross' opinions on administrative matters led around 1960 to conflicts with President A. Hollis Edens in what came to be known as the Gross-Edens Affair. The debate was mostly over whether Duke University should become a regional or national university, and to what degree the institution should be known for its devotion to research or teaching. Gross pressed for rapid growth towards national stature as a research university, an outcome that Duke did later achieve. Edens resigned from his position as University President, and Gross was removed from his administrative position as a result of the conflict.

Gross was a founder of the Oak Ridge Institute for Nuclear Studies (later Oak Ridge Associated Universities) and served as its President until 1949. President Harry S. Truman appointed Gross to the original National Science Foundation board in 1950, a position he held for 12 years. Gross served as President of the American Association for the Advancement of Science in 1962.

== Awards and honors ==
He was elected a Fellow of the American Physical Society in 1939.

Dr. Gross was awarded the Medal for Merit in 1948 for his invention of a plastic bullet for gunnery training in World War II.

== Personal life ==
Gross died on May 4, 1986, in Durham, North Carolina. Upon his death he was survived by a son, a daughter, and two grandsons.
