= Camilo José Cela =

Spanish novelist, poet, essayist (1916–2002)

The Most Excellent Camilo José Cela
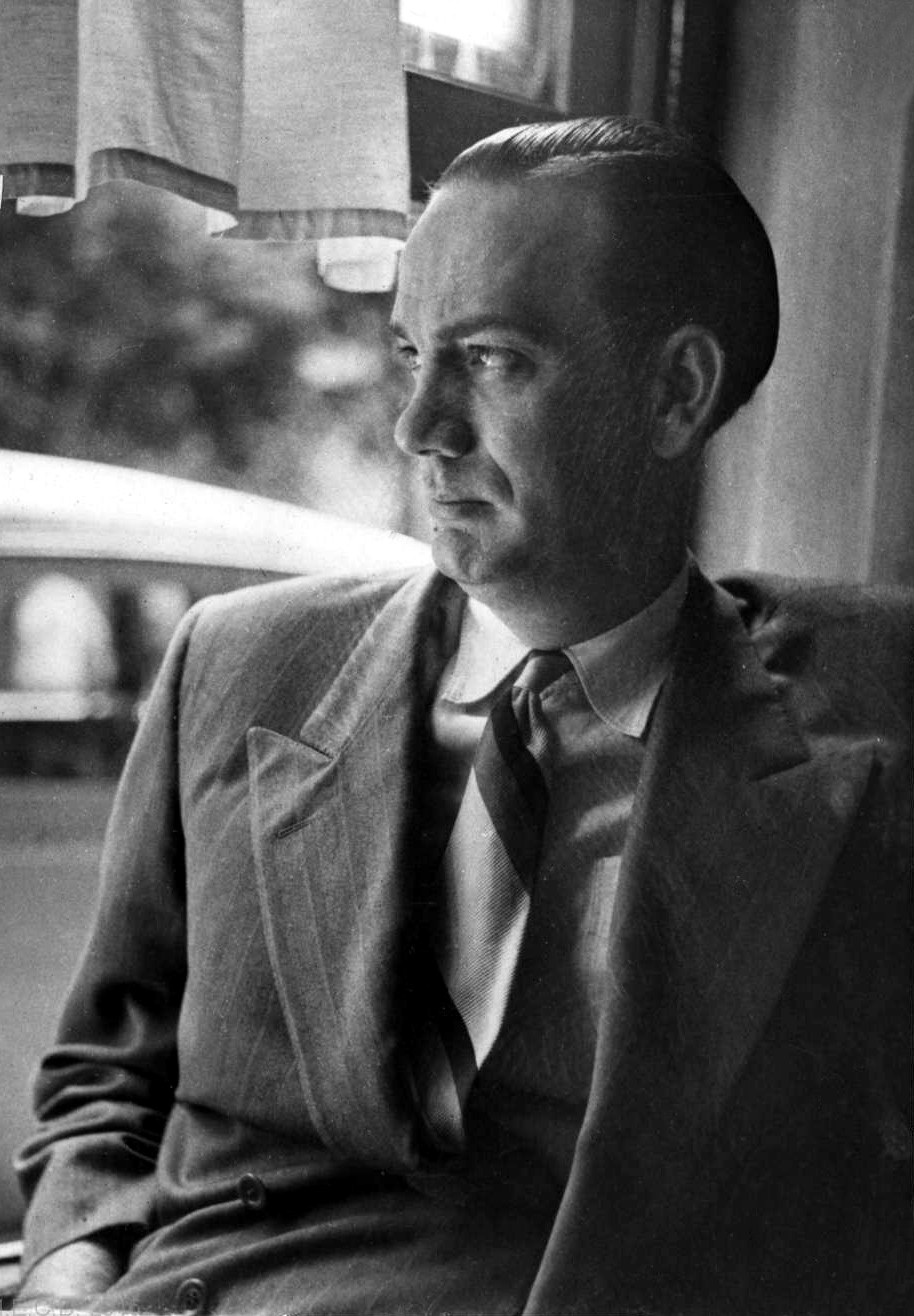
- Born: Camilo José Cela y Trulock; 11 May 1916; Iria Flavia, Galicia, Spain
- Died: 17 January 2002 (aged 85); Madrid, Spain
- Resting place: Iria Flavia cemetery
- Occupations: Novelist; short story writer; essayist
- Spouses: María del Rosario Conde Picavea (m. 1944; div. 1990) Marina Concepción Castaño López (m. 1991)
- Children: Camilo José Cela Conde
- Writing career
- Language: Spanish
- Notable works: The Family of Pascual Duarte; The Hive
- Notable awards: Nobel Prize in Literature 1989; Castelao Medal 1988; Creu de Sant Jordi 1986

Seat Q of the Real Academia Española
- In office 26 May 1957 – 17 January 2002
- Preceded by: Rafael Estrada Arnaiz
- Succeeded by: Carlos Castilla del Pino

Camilo José Cela y Trulock, 1st Marquess of Iria Flavia (Spanish: [kamilo xoˈse ˈθela]; 11 May 1916 – 17 January 2002) was a Spanish novelist, poet, story writer and essayist associated with the Generation of '36 movement.

He was awarded the 1989 Nobel Prize in Literature "for a rich and intensive prose, which with restrained compassion forms a challenging vision of man's vulnerability".

== Childhood and early career ==
Camilo José Cela was born in the rural parish of Iria Flavia, in Padrón, A Coruña, Spain, on 11 May 1916. He was the oldest child of nine. His father, Camilo Crisanto Cela y Fernández, was Galician. His mother, Camila Emanuela Trulock y Bertorini, was a Galician of English and Italian ancestry. The family was upper-middle-class and Cela described his childhood as being "so happy it was hard to grow up."

He lived with his family in Vigo from 1921 to 1925, when they moved to Madrid. There, Cela studied at a Piarist school. In 1931 he was diagnosed with tuberculosis and admitted to the sanatorium of Guadarrama, where he took advantage of his free time to work on his novel Pabellón de reposo. While recovering from the illness Cela began intensively reading works by José Ortega y Gasset and Antonio de Solís y Ribadeneyra.

The Spanish Civil War broke out in 1936 when Cela was 20 years old and just recovering from his illness. His political leanings were conservative and he escaped to the rebel zone. He enlisted as a soldier, and was wounded and hospitalized in Logroño.

== Career ==
The civil war ended in 1939; after the war, Cela became indecisive about his university studies and ended up working in a bureau of textile industries. It was here where he began to write what would become his first novel, La familia de Pascual Duarte (The Family of Pascual Duarte), which was published when he was 26, in 1942. Pascual Duarte has trouble finding validity in conventional morality and commits a number of crimes, including murders, for which he feels nothing. The novel is of particular importance as it played a large part in shaping the direction of the post-World War II Spanish novel.

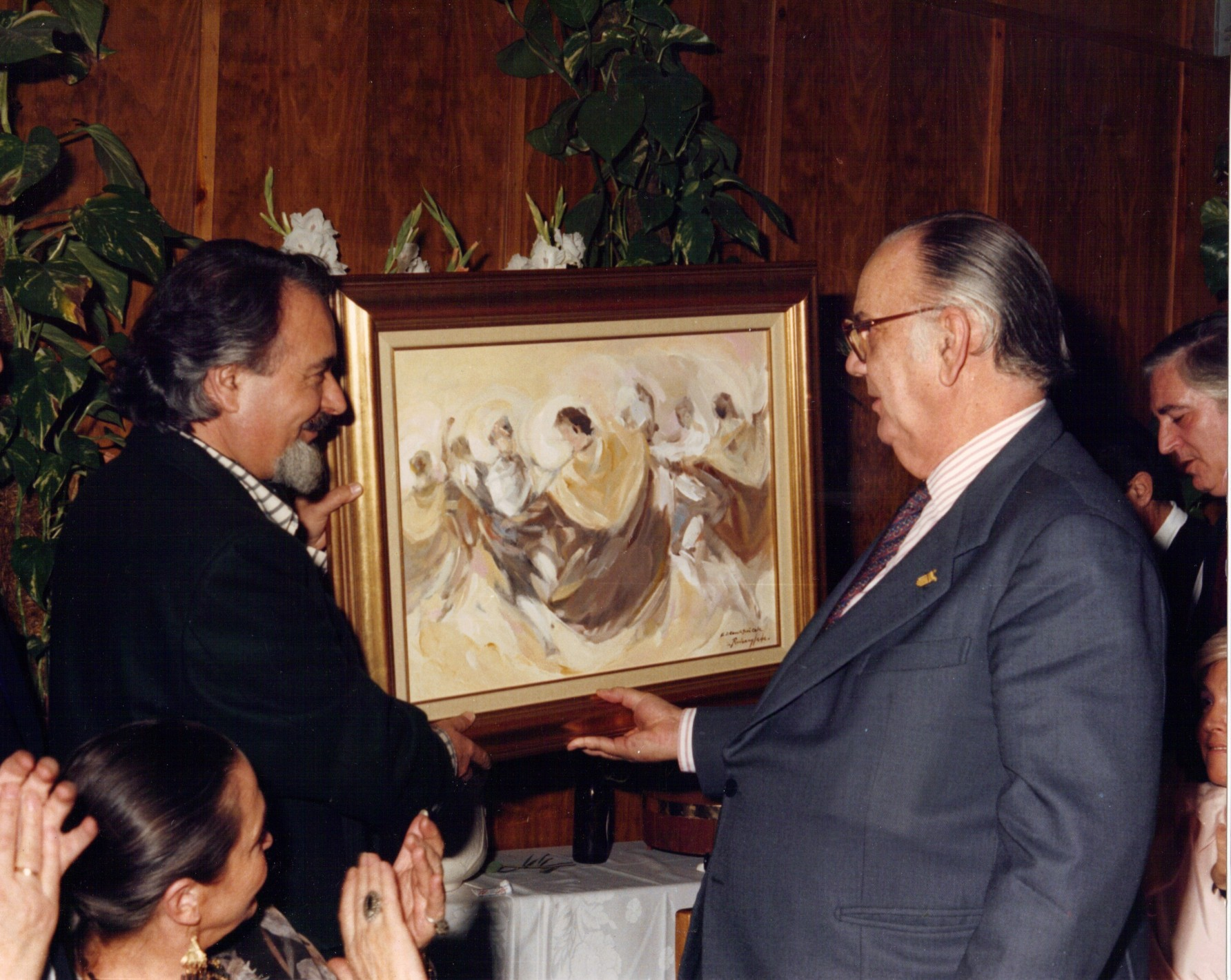
Camilo José Cela (right) in 1988.

Cela became a censor in Francoist Spain in 1943. Perhaps his best-known work was produced during a period where his own writing came under scrutiny from his fellow censors, including La colmena (The Hive) which was published in Buenos Aires in 1951. It was banned in Spain because of the perceived immorality of its erotic themes, and his name could no longer appear in the printed media. The novel portrays more than 300 characters in a style showing the influence of both Spanish realism and contemporary English- and French-language authors. Cela's signature style—a sarcastic, often grotesque, form of realism—is epitomized in La colmena. Cela remained loyal to Francoist Spain, even working as an informer for the Spanish secret police by reporting on the activities of dissident groups and betraying fellow intellectuals.

From the late 1960s, with the publication of San Camilo, 1936, Cela's work became increasingly experimental. In 1988 he wrote Christ Versus Arizona (Spanish: Cristo versus Arizona), which tells the story of the Gunfight at the O.K. Corral in a single sentence that is more than one hundred pages long.

In his later years Cela became known for his scandalous outbursts; in an interview with Mercedes Milá for Spanish state television he boasted of his ability to absorb litres of water via his anus while offering to demonstrate. Cela had already scandalized Spanish society with his Diccionario secreto (Secret Dictionary, 1969–1971), a dictionary of slang and taboo words. In 1998, Cela expressed discomfort towards the presence of homosexual groups at the commemoration of Federico García Lorca's centenary, stating that, "For me, I would prefer a more straightforward and less anecdotal commemoration without the support of gay groups. I have nothing against gays, I just do not take it up the ass".

== Distinctions ==
On 26 May 1957, Cela was appointed a member of the Royal Spanish Academy and given Seat Q. He was appointed Royal Senator in the Constituent Cortes, where he exerted some influence in the wording of the Spanish Constitution of 1978. In 1987, he was awarded the Prince of Asturias Award for Literature.

Cela was awarded the Nobel Prize in Literature in 1989 "for a rich and intensive prose, which with restrained compassion forms a challenging vision of man's vulnerability".

In 1994, he was awarded the Premio Planeta, although some question the objectivity of the awards, and winners on occasion have refused to accept it. Two years later, in recognition of his contributions to literature, Cela was ennobled on 17 May 1996 by King Juan Carlos I, who gave Cela the hereditary title of Marquess of Iria Flavia in the nobility of Spain. On his death the title passed to his son Camilo José Cela Conde.

After winning the Nobel Prize Cela described the Spanish Cervantes Prize for lifetime achievement as a writer as being "covered with shit". In 1995 he was offered the prize, which he accepted.

Cela's arms as 1st Marquess of Iria Flavia (1996)

== Death ==
Cela died from heart disease on 17 January 2002 at the Hospital Centro in Madrid, aged 85. He was buried in his hometown at the parish cemetery of Santa María de Adina.

Cela's will was contested because he favoured his widow and second younger wife, Marina Castaño, over his son Camilo José Cela Conde from his first marriage to Rosario Conde; Conde was awarded two-thirds of his father's estate.

== Selected works ==
=== Spanish ===
==== Novels ====
- La familia de Pascual Duarte [The Family of Pascual Duarte]. Madrid: Aldecoa. 1942.
- Pabellón de reposo [Rest Home]. Translated by Briffault, Herma. Madrid: Afrodisio Aguado. 1943.
- Nuevas andanzas y desventuras de Lazarillo de Tormes. Madrid: La Nave. 1944.
- La colmena [The Hive]. Buenos Aires: Emecé. 1951.
- Mrs. Caldwell habla con su hijo [Mrs. Caldwell Speaks to Her Son]. Barcelona: Destino. 1953.
- La catira. Barcelona: Editorial Noguer. 1955. (Also published under the title Historias de Venezuela.)
- Tobogán de hambrientos. Barcelona: Editorial Noguer. 1962.
- Vísperas, festividad y octava de San Camilo del año 1936 en Madrid. Madrid: Alfaguara. 1969.
- Oficio de tinieblas 5. Barcelona: Noguer. 1973.
- Mazurca para dos muertos. Barcelona: Seix Barral. 1983.
- Cristo versus Arizona [Christ Versus Arizona]. Barcelona: Seix Barral. 1988. ISBN 9788432205828.
- Oficio de tinieblas 5. Barcelona: Plaza & Janés. 1989. ISBN 9788401381485.
- La cruz de San Andrés. Barcelona: Planeta. 1994.
- Madera de boj. Madrid: Espasa-Calpe. 1999. ISBN 9788423979615.

==== Short-story collections ====
- El bonito crimen del carabinero, y otras invenciones. Barcelona: José Janés. 1947.
- El gallego y su cuadrilla. Madrid: Ricardo Aguilera. 1949.
- Baraja de invenciones. Valencia: Castalia. 1953.
- El molino de viento y otros novelas cortas. Barcelona: Noguer. 1956.
- Nuevo retablo de Don Cristobita: Invenciones, figuraciones y alucinaciones. Barcelona: Destino. 1957.

==== Drama and poetry collections ====
- Pisando la dudosa luz del dia. Barcelona: Ed. del Zodíaco. 1945.
- Cancionero de la Alcarria. San Sebastían: Norte. 1948.
- María Sabina. Palma de Mallorca: Papeles de Son Armadans. 1967.
- El caro de heno o El inventor de la guillotina. Palma de Mallorca: Papeles de Son Armadans. 1969.
- María Sabina; El carro de heno o El inventor de la guillotina (2d ed.). Madrid: Alfaguara. 1970.
- Poesía completa. Barcelona: Círculo de lectores. 1996.
- La extracción de la piedra de la locura o El inventor del garrote. Barcelona: Seix Barral. 1999.

==== Travel writing ====
- Viaje a la Alcarria. MadridBarcelona: Revista de Occidente. 1948.
- Avila. Barcelona: Noguer. 1952.
- Del Miño al Bidasoa: Notas de un vagabundaje. Barcelona: Noguer. 1952.
- Vagabundo por Castilla. Barcelona: Seix Barral. 1955.
- Judíos, moros y cristianos: Notas de un vagabundaje por Avila, Segovia y sus tierras. Barcelona: Destino. 1956.
- Primer viaje andaluz : notas de un vagabundaje por Jaén, Córdoba, Sevilla, Huelva y sus tierras. Barcelona: Noguer. 1959.
- Viaje al Pirineo de Lérida : notas de un paseo a pie por el Pallars, Sobirá, el Valle de Arán y el Condado de Ribagorza. Madrid: Alfaguara. 1965.
- Nuevo viaje a la Alcarria. Barcelona: Plaza & Janés. 1986.

==== Essays ====
- Mesa revuelta. Madrid: Ediciones de los Estudiantes Españoles. 1945.
- Cajón de sastre. Madrid: Cid. 1957.
- La rueda de los ocios. Barcelona: Mateu. 1957.

==== Criticism ====
- Cuatro figuras del 98: Unamuno, Valle-Inclán, Baroja, Azorín, y otros retratos y ensayos españoles. Barcelona: Aedos. 1961.

==== Reference works ====
- Diccionario secreto. Madrid: Alfaguara. 1968. (Updated since initial publication.)
- Enciclopedia del erotismo. Madrid: Sedmay. 1977. (4 volumes.)
- Cachondeos, escarceos y otros meneos [prólogo y vocabulario secreto, Pedro Abad Contreras]. Madrid: Ediciones Temas de Hoy. 1991.
- Diccionario geográfico popular de España. Madrid: Editorial Nóesis. 1998.

==== Memoirs ====
- La cucaña: Memorias de Camilo José Cela. Barcelona: Destino. 1959.
- Memorias, entendimientos y voluntades. Barcelona: Plaza & Janés. 1993.

==== Correspondence ====
- Correspondencia con el exilio. Barcelona: Destino. 2009. (Cela's correspondence with 13 exiled Spanish writers: María Zambrano, Rafael Alberti, Américo Castro, Fernando Arrabal, Jorge Guillén, Max Aub, Emilio Prados, Luis Cernuda, Manuel Altolaguirre, León Felipe, Corpus Barga, Francisco Ayala, Ramón J. Sender.)
- Correspondencia: Camilo José Cela, Antonio Vilanova. Barcelona: PPU. 2012.

==== Collected works ====
- Obra completa. Barcelona: Ediciones Destino. 1962. (Volumes published as completed since 1962.) Volume 1: Las tres primeras novelas (1942—44); Volume 2: Cuentos (1941—53); Volume 3: Apuntes carpetovetonicos. Novelas cortas (1941–56); Volume 4: Viajes por España, 1 (1948—52); Volume 5: Viajes por España, 2 (1952—58); Volume 6: Viajes por España, 3 (1959—64)l Volume 7: Tres novelas más (1951—55); Volume 8: Los amigos y otra novela (1960—62); Volume 9: Glosa del mundo en torno. Articulos, 1. (1940—53). Mesa revuelta. 5. ed.; Volume 10: Glosa del mundo en torno. Articulos, 2. (1944—59). Cajón de sastre. 4. ed; Paginas de geografía errabunda. 3. ed.; Volume 1:. Glosa del mundo en torno. Artʹiculos, 3 (1945-1954). Las compañías convenientes y otros fingimientos y cegueras. 3a ed. Garito de hospicianos o Guirigay de imposturas y bambollas. 4a ed.; Volume 12: Glosa del mundo en torno. Artículos, 4 (1943—61). La rueda de los ocios. 4a ed. Cuatro figuras del 98. 2a ed.; Volume 14: Enciclopedia del erotismo, 1. Aachen—Cirene; Volume 15: Enciclopedia del erotismo, 1. Cirial—Futrʹosofo; Volume 16: Enciclopedia del erotismo, 3. Gabacho—Óvulo; Volume 17: Enciclopedia del erotismo, 4. Pabst—Zurrucarse.
- Olivia Rodríguez González, ed. (2006). Retorno a Iria Flavia: obra dispersa y olvidada, 1940-2001. Santiago de Compostela: Alvarellos Editora.

=== English translations ===
- Pascual Duarte's family. Translated by Marks, John. London: Eyre & Spottiswoode. 1946.
- The Hive. Translated by Cohen, J.M. New York: Farrar, Straus and Young. 1953. (Reprinted: New York: New York: Noonday Press, 1990.) Translation of La colmena.
- The Family of Pascual Duarte. Translated by Kerrigan, Anthony. Boston: Little, Brown. 1964.
- Journey to the Alcarria. Translated by López-Morillas, Frances M. Madison, Wisconsin: University of Wisconsin Press. 1964. Translation of Viaje a la Alcarria.
- Pascual Duarte and His Family. Translated by Briffault, Herma. New York: Las Americas Pub. Co. 1965.
- Mrs. Caldwell Speaks to Her Son. Translated by Bernstein, J.S. Ithaca, N.Y.: Cornell University Press. 1968. Authorized translation of Mrs. Caldwell habla con su hijo.
- San Camilo, 1936: The Eve, Feast, and Octave of St. Camillus of the year 1936 in Madrid. Translated by Polt, J.H.R. Durham: Duke University Press. 1991. Translation of Visperas, festividad y octava de San Camilo del año 1936 en Madrid.
- Mazurka for Two Dead Men. Translated by Haugaard, Patricia. New York: New Directions. 1992. ISBN 9780811212229. Translation of Mazurca para dos muertos.
- Boxwood. Translated by Haugaard, Patricia. New York: New Directions. 2002. Translation of Madera de boj.
- Christ Versus Arizona. Translated by Sokolinsky, Martin. Champaign: Dalkey Archive Press. 2007.
- The Hive. Translated by Womack, James. New York Review Books. 2023.

== See also ==
- Journey to the Alcarria
- Café Gijón (Madrid)
- Universidad Camilo José Cela

Political offices
Preceded by Title jointly held	Spanish Senator; 1977–1979	Succeeded by Title jointly held
Awards
Preceded by Mario Vargas Llosa; Rafael Lapesa	Recipient of the Prince of Asturias Award for Literature; 1987	Succeeded by José Angel Valente; Carmen Martín Gaite
Preceded by Naguib Mahfouz	Recipient of the Nobel Prize for Literature; 1989	Succeeded by Octavio Paz
Preceded by Mario Vargas Llosa	Recipient of the Miguel de Cervantes Prize; 1995	Succeeded by José García Nieto
Spanish nobility
New title	Marquess of Iria Flavia; 1996–2002	Succeeded by Camilo José Cela Conde
