= Mazurka for Two Dead Men =

1983 novel by Camilo José Cela

- Author: Camilo José Cela
- Original title: Mazurca para dos muertos
- Translator: Patricia Haugaard
- Language: Spanish
- Publisher: Seix Barral
- Publication date: 1983
- Publication place: Spain
- English publication date: 1992
- Pages: 266
- ISBN: 8432204846

Mazurka for Two Dead Men (Spanish: Mazurca para dos muertos) is a 1983 novel by the Spanish writer Camilo José Cela. It is set in the mountains of rural Galicia in the 1920s–1940s, portraying often brutal village life.

== Plot ==
The novel is fundamentally a story about the Spanish Civil War set in rural Galicia. Against the backdrop of a large gallery of characters and customs, the members of the most important family in the area, the Guxindes, stand out. Events of the war are described, especially the one that constitutes the novel's central plot: the murder of Baldomero Marvís and Cidrán Segade by Fabián Minguela, and the subsequent revenge that the family exacts on him after the war. Taking advantage of the circumstances of the war in Nationalist territory, Fabián Minguela has Afouto and Cidrán taken from their homes and shoots them in the back on the road. After the war, the Guxindes reunite, and Afouto's brother, Tanis Perello, is chosen to kill Fabián Minguela (Moucho). She does so by setting her attack dogs on him, so that in the forensic report, reproduced at the end of the novel as a sole appendix, his death is classified as accidental, due to a wolf attack. Meanwhile, Adega, Cidrán Segade's wife, upon Moucho's death, digs up his body and feeds it to the pig, from which she then eats, sending some of the slaughtered meat to the rest of the family.
