= The Hive (Cela novel) =

1950 novel by Camilo José Cela

- First edition
- Author: Camilo José Cela
- Original title: La colmena
- Language: Spanish
- Series: Caminos inciertos
- Genre: Experimental novel
- Publisher: Emecé Ediciones, S.A.
- Publication date: 1950
- Publication place: Argentina
- Media type: Print (Hardback & Paperback)
- Pages: 350 pp (Spanish paperback edition)
- ISBN: 84-7039-436-3 (Spanish paperback edition)
- OCLC: 12969993
- LC Class: PQ6605.E44 C6 1984

The Hive (Spanish: La colmena) (also translated as The Beehive) is a novel written by the Spanish author Camilo José Cela, first published in 1950.

== Summary ==
The novel is set in Madrid in 1943, after the end of the Spanish Civil War, and deals with the poverty and general unhappiness found in Spain by examining a multitude of fictional characters in varying levels of detail. It is notable in that it contains over 300 characters and is considered to be the most important novel written in post–civil war Spain. Because of rigorous censorship Cela was unable to get La colmena published in his native Spain, and was instead forced to publish it in Buenos Aires.

The book consists of six chapters and an epilogue. Each chapter contains a number of short passages describing short episodes and focusing on a particular character. In this way a series of insignificant events and characters work together to form an important conclusion, much in the same way that a hive of bees works together to achieve something much more than they could achieve individually.

== Structure ==
The novel itself is composed of two hundred and fifteen fragments separated by a blank space, grouped into seven chapters of different lengths.

Chapter	Number of sequences
I	47
II	46
III	25
IV	41
V	28
VI	9
Final	19
Total	215
Chapter	Number of sequences

== Time ==
The events of La Colmena occur in three days in December 1943, a date deduced from a news story which Rómulo the bookseller reads in a newspaper, where the announcement concerning Martín Marco also appears. The newspaper also informs us of the Tehran conference between the world leaders. However, because there are no more facts, the time of the story is offered to the reader in a vague manner: it is set in the first years of post war Spain, and in fact it could have been set anywhere between 1941 and 1945.

The duration of the story is brief as everything happens over the course of three days. The first six chapters happen in two days and the last occurs three or four days later. But the most significant thing is the chronological disorder, as facts are not told in the manner which they happen. If you were to read the novel in a traditional manner, you would need to re-order the chapters in the following order: I, II, IV, VI, III, V, Final.

== Language and style ==
=== Register ===
In La Colmena, Cela combines two linguistic levels, the cultured and the popular. One way of examining the novel would be in this manner:

Manner of speech	Voice of the	Level
Narration, description	Narrator	Literary
Dialogues, monologues	Character	Colloquial

== English translations ==
- The Hive, trans. J. M. Cohen with Arturo Barea (Farrar, Straus and Young, 1953; Dalkey Archive, 2001)
- The Hive, trans. James Womack (New York Review Books, 2023)

== In popular culture ==
In The Hive there are references to the world of film, actors, and spectators. The Hive was made into a film directed by Mario Camus in 1982.
