= Mondéjar =

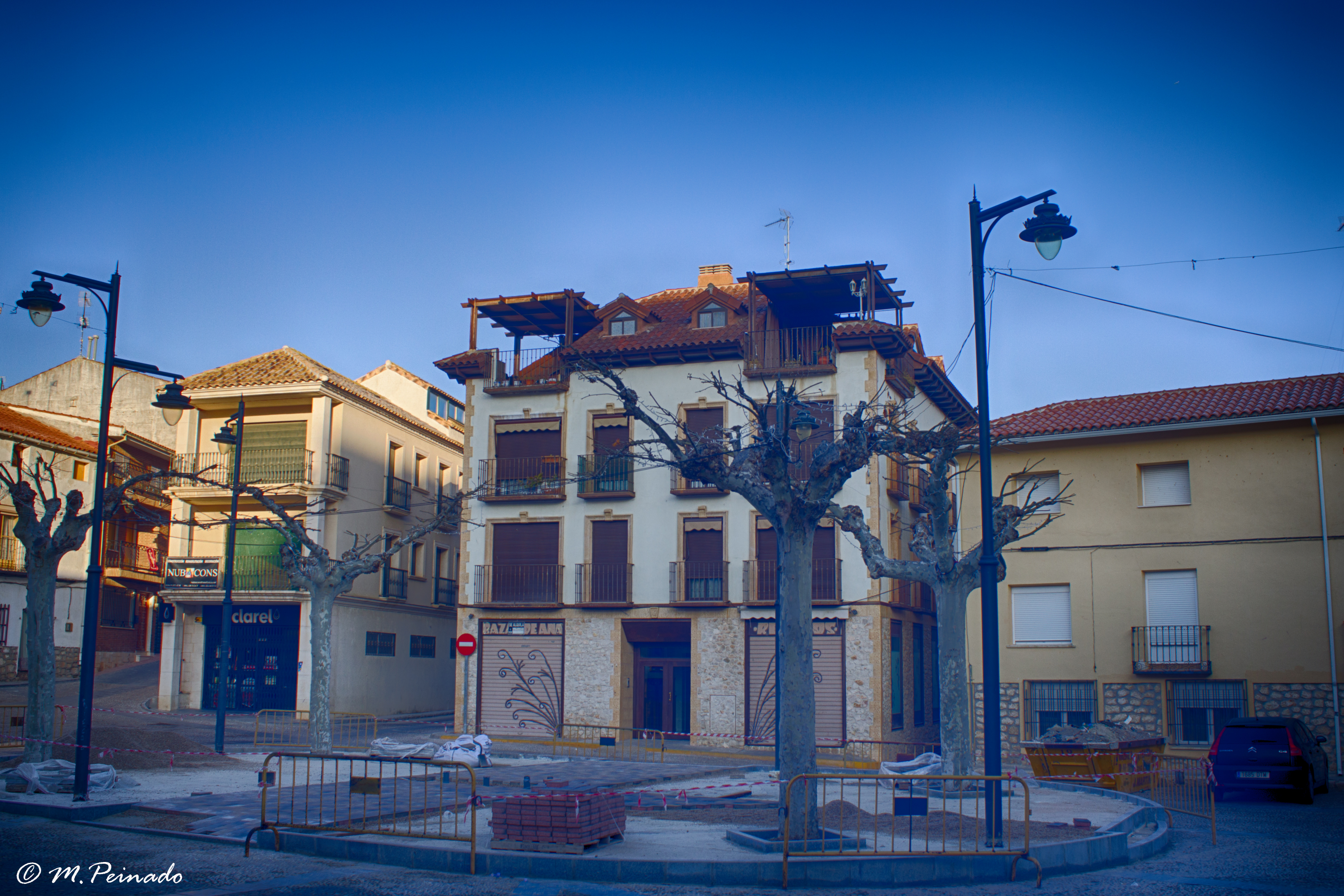

- Coat of arms

- Location within Province of Guadalajara Location within Castilla-La Mancha Location within Spain
- Coordinates: 40°19′26″N 3°06′30″W
- Country: Spain
- Autonomous community: Castilla-La Mancha
- Province: Guadalajara
- Municipality: Mondéjar

Area
  - Total: 48.43 km^{2} (18.70 sq mi)

Population (2025-01-01)
  - Total: 2,918
  - Density: 60.25/km^{2} (156.1/sq mi)
- Time zone: UTC+1 (CET)
  - Summer (DST): UTC+2 (CEST)

Mondéjar is a municipality located in the province of Guadalajara, Spain. According to the 2008 census (INE), the municipality has a population of 2,900 inhabitants.

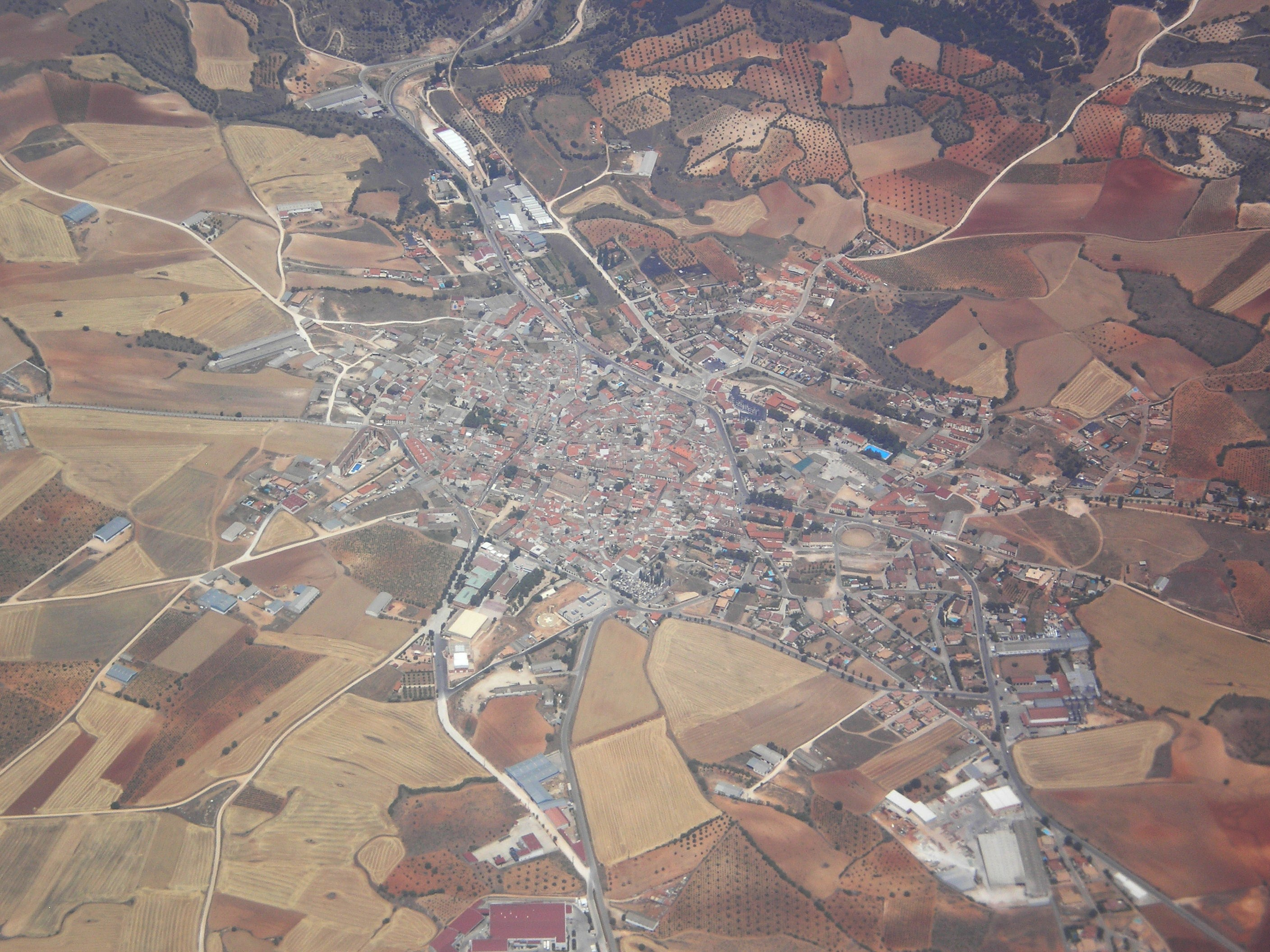
Aerial photograph of Mondéjar
