= The Family of Pascual Duarte =

1942 novel written by Camilo José Cela

- First edition
- Author: Camilo José Cela
- Original title: La familia de Pascual Duarte
- Translator: Anthony Kerrigan
- Language: Spanish
- Publisher: Ediciones Aldecoa, S.A.
- Publication date: October 1942
- Publication place: Spain
- English publication date: 1946
- Media type: Print
- ISBN: 84-233-0732-8

The Family of Pascual Duarte (Spanish: La familia de Pascual Duarte, pronounced [la faˈmilja ðe pasˈkwal dwˈaɾte]) is a 1942 novel written by Spanish Nobel laureate Camilo José Cela. The first two editions created an uproar and in less than a year it was banned. A new Spanish edition was revised in 1943 in December of that year.

This novel is fundamental to the generation of tremendismo (named from tremendo, "awful, tremendous"), which focuses on the treatment of its characters and is marked by extended and frequent violent scenes. The novel is in fact considered the first novel of this style of writing, but also contains themes of extreme realism and existentialism: the characters live in the margins of society and their lives are submersed in anguish and pain; the archetype of this theme is found in the protagonist of the novel, Pascual Duarte, who has learned that violence is the only way to solve his problems. The Family of Pascual Duarte has various narrators, the main one being Duarte, who recounts his history in a rural dialect.

The protagonist is from Extremadura and his life unfolds between 1882 and 1937, years in which the social and political structures of Spain were marked by extreme instability. This time is one of the most agitated periods of time under the historic constitution.

The novel has clear religious overtones, in spite of the fact that Cela himself was never shown to be a particularly pious man, and abounds with allusions to God.

== Characters ==
- Pascual Duarte: the narrator-protagonist. His life is full of pain and bad luck. He is a man of impulse and no conscience, which leads him to murder without scruples and as a consequence to spend his life in jail.
- Rosario: Pascual's sister. She has total control over their father. She leaves their house and probably begins to work as a prostitute.
- Esteban Duarte: Pascual's father. He dies from a rabid dog bite.
- Lola: Pascual's first wife. She loses two sons, the first to a miscarriage caused by riding a horse, and the other, Pascualito, 11 months after his birth.
- Mario: Pascual's half-brother on his mother's side, son of Rafael. He dies at a young age.
- Rafael: the lover of Pascual's mother. He is cruel, especially to his son Mario.
- Pascual's mother: a perverse, cruel and alcoholic woman. She hits her children and is unfaithful to her husband, Esteban. Finally, Pascual kills her for all that has happened.
- Engracia: the witch of the town. She often visits Pascual's house and is present for many of the sicknesses that Pascual's family has to endure.
- El Estirao: a pimp who lives off of his prostitutes. Pascual resents him profoundly for dishonoring his sister and wife, and ultimately kills him.
- Don Manuel: the priest of the town. Pascual goes to see him when he is about to get married.
- Lurueña: the priest of the prison. He has a good relationship with Pascual and is with him in the moments before his very death.
- Esperanza: Pascual's second wife and niece of Engracia. She was in love with him even before he married Lola, and the two get married after he gets out of prison.
- Don Conrado: the director of the prison. A good man who helps Pascual to leave prison for the first time.

== Plot ==
The first-person narrator-protagonist Pascual Duarte, while awaiting execution in the condemned cell, tells the story of his family life and his homicidal past, culminating in matricide. He claims, amongst other things, that Fate is controlling his life and whatever he does nothing will ever change.

As aforementioned, the book could be said to explore a Spanish version of existentialism: as in Albert Camus's L'étranger, Pascual is seen by society as an outsider, unable or unwilling to follow its norms. His autobiographical tale shows some of the tremendously harsh peasant reality of rural Spain up to the beginning of Franco's regime.

== Translations ==
The book was translated into English by Anthony Kerrigan in 1964.

== Bibliography ==
- The Family of Pascual Duarte, trans. by Anthony Kerrigan [1964], repr. Illinois: Dalkey Archive, 2004
- Alan Hoyle, Cela: La familia de Pascual Duarte (Critical Guides to Spanish Texts, 60), London: Grant & Cutler, 1994
