= Rojas =

Spanish surname

- Place of origin: Spain

Rojas is a surname found throughout the Spanish-speaking world, especially in Latin America.

Rojas may refer to:

== People ==
=== A ===
- Adrián Rojas (born 1977), Chilean professional football player and father
- Aguelmis Rojas (born 1978), Cuban long-distance runner
- Agustín de Rojas Villandrando (1572–1618), Spanish writer and actor
- Alberto Müller Rojas (1935–2010), Venezuelan politician and general
- Alberto Rojas (born 1965), Mexican-born prelate of the Catholic Church
- Alberto Rojas Jiménez (1900–1934), Chilean poet and journalist
- Alejandro González Rojas (born 1955), former Costa Rican goalkeeper
- Alexis Rojas (cyclist) (born 1972), Colombian road cyclist
- Alfredo Rojas (Argentine footballer) (1937–2023)
- Alfredo Rojas (Peruvian footballer) (born 1991)
- Anderson Rojas, amateur boxer from Ecuador
- Andrea Rojas, fictional character from DC Comics
- Andres Almonaster y Rojas (1724–1798), Spanish civil servant of New Orleans
- Ángel Clemente Rojas (born 1944), former Argentine footballer
- Ángel Dolores Rojas (1851–1918), Argentine politician
- Ángel Rojas (born 1985), Chilean footballer who plays as midfielder
- Antonio Domingo Rojas Melero (born 1984), Spanish football player
- Ariel Rojas (born 1986), Argentine football midfielder
- Arístides Rojas Espaillat, Venezuelan writer
- Armando Rojas Guardia, Venezuelan writer
- Arturo Montiel Rojas (born 1943), Mexican politician

=== B ===
- Benigno Filomeno de Rojas (1821–1865), lawyer and Dominican politician
- Benjamin Rojas (born 1985), Argentine actor and singer
- Bernardo de Sandoval y Rojas (1546–1618), Spanish bishop and cardinal, Grand Inquisitor of Spain from 1608 to 1618
- Bruno Rojas (born 1993), Bolivian sprinter

=== C ===
- Carlos Rojas (footballer) (1928–1963), Chilean football midfielder
- Carmine Rojas, bass player and Rod Stewart's bass player and music director
- Christopher Rojas (born 1982), composer, musician, songwriter, and record producer
- Clare Rojas (born 1976), American artist
- Clara Rojas (born 1964), Colombian tax lawyer, university lecturer, and campaign manager
- Claudio Rojas (born 1973), retired Guatemalan football midfielder
- Clemente Rojas (born 1952), Colombian boxer
- Cookie Rojas (born 1939), former Major League Baseball player, manager and coach
- Cristián Rojas (born 1985), Chilean footballer
- Cristóbal Rojas (artist) (1857–1890), Venezuelan painter
- Cristóbal de Rojas (1555–1614), a Spanish military engineer and architect

=== D ===
- Darío Rojas (born 1960), retired Bolivian football goalkeeper
- Diego de Rojas (died 1544), 16th-century Spanish Conquistador
- Diego Rojas (born 1995), Chilean footballer
- Don Rojas (born 1949), journalist and political commentator from St. Vincent

=== E ===
- Eladio Rojas (1934–1991), former Chilean footballer
- Elio Rojas (born 1982), featherweight boxer from the Dominican Republic
- Eloy Rojas (born 1967), professional boxer in the Featherweight division
- Emilio Rojas (born 1984), American recording artist and rapper from Rochester, New York
- Esteban Rojas Tovar, Colombian educator, philanthropist, bishop of the diocese of Garzón
- Euclides Rojas (born 1967), Cuban-born coach and player development official in Major League Baseball

=== F ===
- Felipe Rojas (born 1986), Chilean footballer
- Felipe Rojas Alou (born 1935), Dominican baseball player
- Fernando de Rojas (c. 1465 – 1541), Castilian author
- Francisca Rojas, believed to be the first criminal found guilty through fingerprint evidence
- Francisco de Rojas Zorrilla (1607–1660), Spanish dramatist
- Francisco Goméz de Sandoval y Rojas, Duke of Lerma, Duke of Lerma (1552/1553–1625)
- Francisco Rojas Rojas (born 1974), Chilean football defender
- Francisco Rojas Tollinchi (1911–1965), Puerto Rican poet, civic leader and journalist
- Francisco Rojas Toledo (born 1956), Mexican politician

=== G ===
- Genaro Vázquez Rojas (1931–1972), former school teacher, militant and guerrilla fighter
- Geraldin Rojas (born 1981), contemporary Argentine tango dancer, also known as Geraldin Paludi
- Gonzalo Rojas (1916–2011), Chilean poet
- Guadalupe Pérez Rojas (born 1994), Argentine tennis player
- Guillermo Rojas (born 1983), Mexican football left back
- Guillermo Soto Rojas, Venezuelan politician
- Gustavo Andrés Rojas (born 1988), Colombian football defender
- Gustavo Rojas (footballer) (born 1988), Colombian football defender
- Gustavo Rojas (golfer) (born 1967), Argentine professional golfer
- Gustavo Rojas Pinilla (1900–1975), Colombian General, military dictator of Colombia from 1953 to 1957
- Gustavo Rojas Pinilla International Airport, international airport on the San Andrés Island, Colombia

=== H ===
- Héctor Rojas Herazo (1920–2002), Colombian writer
- Henry Rojas (born 1987), football striker from Colombia
- Heriberto Rojas, former Costa Rican footballer
- Hernando de Manrique de Rojas, commander of Spanish forces sent in late 1562 to destroy the French fort at Port Royal
- Homar Rojas (born 1964), former player and a manager in Minor League Baseball
- Hugo Ballivian Rojas (1901–1993), de facto President of Bolivia 1951–1952

=== I ===
- Ibrahim Rojas (born 1975), Cuban sprint canoeist
- Isaac Rojas (1906–1993), Argentine Admiral of the Navy and de facto Vice President
- Iván Guzmán de Rojas (1934–2022), Bolivian research scientist and the creator of Atamiri

=== J ===
- Jesús Kiki Rojas (born 1964), former professional boxer in the super flyweight division
- Jesus Rojas (1950–1991), Nicaraguan and a major leader of the FMLN resistance movement in El Salvador
- Joao Rojas (born 1997), Ecuadorian footballer
- Joao Rojas (born 1989), Ecuadorian footballer
- Joaquín Rojas (1938–2018), Filipino former basketball player
- Joel Humberto Rojas Pérez (born 1968), Cuban painter
- Johan Rojas (born 2000), Dominican baseball player
- John Rojas, Jr. (died 2000), founder of the Chula Vista Historical Society
- Jorge A. Rojas (born 1940), general authority of The Church of Jesus Christ of Latter-day Saints from 1991 to 1996
- Jorge Alberto Rojas (born 1977), Venezuelan football midfielder
- Jorge Rojas (footballer) (born 1993), Paraguayan international footballer
- Jorge Rojas Justicia (born 1983), Spanish footballer
- José Antonio Rojas (born 1987), Chilean footballer
- José Domingo Gómez Rojas (1896–1920), Chilean poet
- José Joaquín Rojas (born 1985), Spanish professional road bicycle racer
- José López Portillo y Rojas (1850–1923), Mexican lawyer, politician and man-of-letters
- José Manuel Rojas (born 1983), Chilean defender who currently plays for Universidad de Chile
- José María Rojas Garrido (1824–1883), Colombian Senator
- José Manuel Rojas (footballer, born 1952), football player from Costa Rica
- José Rojas (baseball) (born 1993), American baseball player
- Jose Rojas (racquetball) (born 1990), professional racquetball player
- Josh Rojas (born 1994), American baseball player
- Juan Carlos Rojas (born 1984), Mexican footballer
- Juan Fernández de Rojas (1750–1819), Spanish historian, writer and humorist
- Juan Pablo Rojas Paúl (1826–1905), President of Venezuela from 1888 to 1890
- Juan Rodrigo Rojas (born 1988), Paraguayan football midfielder
- Julian Guillermo Rojas (born 1990), Colombian footballer

=== K ===
- Kendry Rojas (born 2002), Cuban baseball player

=== L ===
- Leonardo Ly Rojas (born 1985), Costa Rican footballer
- Leonel Herrera Rojas (born 1978), former Chilean footballer
- Liberato Marcial Rojas (1870–1922), provisional President of Paraguay July 6, 1911 – February 28, 1912
- Lorena Rojas (born 1972), Mexican actress and singer best known for soap operas
- Luis Giampietri Rojas (born 1940), retired admiral of the Peruvian Navy
- Luis Rojas (disambiguation), several people
- Luis Rojas Mena (1917–2009), Mexican Bishop of the Roman Catholic Church

=== M ===
- Manuel Antonio Hermoso Rojas (born 1935), Canarian politician
- Manuel Rojas (Author) (1896–1973), Chilean writer and journalist
- Manuel Rojas (footballer) (born 1954), retired football midfielder from Chile
- Manuel Rojas (independence leader) (1820–18??), Commander of the Liberation Army against Spanish rule in Puerto Rico
- Marco Antonio Rojas, Costa Rican goalkeeper
- Marco Rojas, (born 1991), New Zealand footballer
- Marcus Rojas (born 1962), tubist from New York City, best known for his work in jazz
- Margot Rojas Mendoza (1903–1996), Mexican pianist and teacher
- María Eugenia Rojas Correa (born 1932), retired Colombian political figure
- Marielys Rojas (born 1986), Venezuelan athlete specializing in the high jump
- Marlon Rojas (born 1979), Trinidad and Tobago soccer player
- Marta Rojas (1928–2021), Cuban journalist and novelist
- Mateo Rojas Alou (1938–2011), Dominican baseball player
- Matías Rojas (disambiguation), multiple people
- Mauricio Rojas (born 1950), Swedish politician, political economist, member of the Riksdag since 2002
- Mauricio Rojas Toro (born 1978), Chilean football (soccer) player
- Mel Rojas (born 1966), pitcher with a 10-year career from 1990 to 1999
- Memo Rojas, Mexican-born race car driver
- Michelle Rojas, (born 1987), American voice actress affiliated with Funimation
- Miguel Rojas (footballer), Colombian football defender
- Miguel Rojas (baseball), Venezuelan baseball player
- Mike Rojas (born 1963), American professional baseball coach and player development official
- Minnie Rojas (1933–2002), relief pitcher in Major League Baseball
- Moisés Rojas Alou (born 1966), former Dominican-American outfielder in Major League Baseball

=== N ===
- Nerio Rojas (1890–1971), Argentine physician and writer on forensic medicine
- Nicolas Nunez Rojas (born 1984), Chilean football (soccer) midfielder
- Nicolás Rojas Acosta (1873–1946), Argentine botanist and pteridologist
- Noel Guzmán Boffil Rojas (1954–2021), Cuban painter
- Nydia Rojas (born 1980), American singer of Mexican/Cuban/Yaqui Indian heritage
- Nydia Rojas (album) (1996), the first album released by American singer Nydia Rojas

=== O ===
- Octavio Rojas, Cuban baseball player
- Omaira Rojas Cabrera (born 1967), FARC guerrilla
- Oscar Rojas (Chilean footballer) (born 1958), Chilean football defender
- Óscar Rojas (Costa Rican footballer) (born 1979), Costa Rican footballer
- Óscar Rojas (Mexican footballer) (born 1981), Mexican football player
- Oscar Emilio Rojas (born 1979), Costa Rican-Mexican naturalized football midfielder
- Óscar Pérez Rojas (born 1973), Mexican football goalkeeper
- Óscar Ricardo Rojas (born 1988), Mexican footballer
- Octavio Beras Rojas (1906–1990), Dominican prelate of the Roman Catholic Church

=== P ===
- Pablo Rojas Guardia, Venezuelan writer
- Pablo Rojas Paz (1896–1956), Argentine writer born in Tucumán
- Paola Rojas (born 1976), Mexico City television news anchor
- Pedro Jose Rojas, Venezuelan politician
- Pedro de Rojas, Spanish lawyer and colonial official in the Philippines and New Spain
- Percy Rojas (born 1949), retired football midfielder from Peru
- Peter Rojas (born 1975), the co-founder of technology blogs Gizmodo and Engadget

=== R ===
- Rafael Hernández Rojas (born 1946), Mexican former swimmer
- Rafael Rojas (actor) (born 1961), Mexican male fashion model and actor
- Raúl Rojas (born 1955), professor of informatics and mathematics at the Free University of Berlin
- Raul Rojas (1941–2012), Mexican American featherweight boxer
- René Rojas Galdames (1919–1988), Chilean lawyer and diplomat
- Ricardo Francisco Rojas (born 1974), Chilean football (soccer) player
- Ricardo Ismael Rojas (born 1971), Argentine born former football defender
- Ricardo Rojas (boxer) (born 1955), retired boxer from Cuba
- Ricardo Rojas (writer) (1882–1957), Argentine journalist and writer
- Ricardo Rojas Frías (born 1955), retired boxer from Cuba
- Richard Rojas (born 1975), Bolivian football midfielder
- Roberto Rojas (born 1957), Chilean goalkeeper
- Roberto Rojas (Peruvian footballer) (1955–1991), Peruvian football defender
- Roberto Rojas (politician) (1966–2022), Bolivian politician
- Roberto Rojas (Spanish footballer) (born 1974), Spanish footballer
- Rodrigo Rojas (Paraguayan footballer) (born 1988), Paraguayan footballer
- Rodrigo Rojas DeNegri (1967–1986), young photographer burnt alive in Chile
- Roger Rojas, Honduran football player (Rojas) Producer

=== S ===
- Samuel Moreno Rojas (born 1960), Colombian American politician
- Sandra Rojas (born 1973), Mexican sprint canoeist
- Sergio Rojas (Argentine footballer) (born 1973), Argentine former football player
- Sergio Rojas (Paraguayan footballer) (1940–2010), Paraguayan football player
- Simón de Rojas (1552–1624), Spanish priest of the Trinitarian Order
- Simon de Rojas Clemente y Rubio (1777–1827), Spanish botanist
- Sixto Rojas (1982–2007), Paraguayan footballer

=== T ===
- Teodoro Rojas (1877–1954), Paraguayan botanist
- Tito Rojas a.k.a. "El Gallo" (The Rooster) (1955–2020), salsa singer and bandleader
- Tomás Rojas (disambiguation), several people
- Tony Rojas (born 2005), American football player
- Toribio Rojas, former coach of the Puerto Rico Islanders, a USL soccer team

=== V ===
- Vicente Rojas Lizcano (1879–1943), aka Biófilo Panclasta, individualist anarchist writer and activist
- Victor Joy Way Rojas (born 1945), former Peruvian politician
- Víctor Julio Suárez Rojas (1953–2010), high-ranking member of the Revolutionary Armed Forces of Colombia (FARC)
- Victor Rojas (born 1968), former member of the Texas Rangers radio broadcast team

=== Y ===
- Yulimar Rojas (born 1995), Venezuelan track and field athlete

== See also ==
- Roxas, archaic spelling
- Rojas (disambiguation)
- Alou family, a prominent Dominican Republic baseball family bearing the paternal surname of Rojas

Media related to Rojas (surname) at Wikimedia Commons
