= Jimbo =

- Gender: Male

Other names
- Related names: James, Jim, Jimmy

Jimbo is a given name. It is often a nickname for James. It is also a Japanese surname, and it means state or province in Swahili. It may refer to:

== Given name or nickname ==
- James Insell (born 1982), Canadian theatrical designer and drag queen professionally known as Jimbo
- Jimbo Aquino (born 1985), Filipino professional basketball player
- Jimbo Covert (born 1960), former American football player
- Jimbo Elrod (1954–2016), former American football player
- Jimbo Fisher (born 1965), American college football coach and former player
- Jimbo J (born 1985), Israeli musician
- Jimbo Mathus (born 1967), co-founder of the band Squirrel Nut Zippers
- Jimmy Wales (born 1966), co-founder of Wikipedia, known online as Jimbo Wales
- Jimbo Wallace, bass guitarist for the American psychobilly band The Reverend Horton Heat

== Surname ==
- AC Jimbo (born 1956), English television presenter and journalist
- Akira Jimbo (born 1959), Japanese drummer
- Michio Jimbo (born 1951), Japanese mathematician
- Nobuhiko Jimbo (1900–1978), Japanese military officer
- Rei Jimbo (born 1974), Japanese Olympic synchronized swimmer

== Fictional characters ==
- Jimbo, a recurring comic book character of Gary Panter
- Jimbo Gumbo, a character in the comic strip Rose Is Rose
- Jimbo, a talking airplane in Jimbo and the Jet-Set, a British animated cartoon series
- Jimbo, nickname of James Rockford in the TV series The Rockford Files
- Jimbo Jones, a character in the TV series The Simpsons
- Jimbo Kern, a character in the TV series South Park
- Jimbo, nickname of Code Lyoko character Jim Moralés
- Jimbo, nickname of The Adventures Of Jimmy Neutron character Jimmy Neutron
- Jimbo, the name of a teddy gorilla given away by Co-op UK
- Jimbo, the name given to Bill Rizer in the American localization of Contra III: The Alien Wars
- Jimbo, the nickname of the protagonist in the movie Treasure Planet
- Jimbo, the eponymous protagonist of the novel Jimbo by Algernon Blackwood
- Thardid Jimbo, cannibal giant in Australian Aboriginal mythology
- Jimbo, nickname of James Gordon in the TV series Gotham
- Jimbo, a character in The Boss Baby
- Jimbo, a talking joker card and mascot of the video game Balatro
- Jimbo the Juggler, a fictional circus character in The Wiggles Movie

== See also ==
- James (disambiguation)
- Jim (disambiguation)
- Jimmy (disambiguation)
