= President Roxas =

President Roxas may refer to:

- Manuel Roxas (1892–1948), 5th President of the Philippines
- President Roxas, Capiz, a municipality in the Philippines
- President Roxas, Cotabato, a municipality in the Philippines
- President Manuel A. Roxas, Zamboanga del Norte, a municipality in the Philippines

== See also ==
- Roxas (disambiguation)
