= Residence on Earth =

Book of poetry

1973 bilingual edition (publ. New Directions) translated by Donald D. Walsh

Residence on Earth (Spanish: Residencia en la tierra) is a book of poetry by Chilean poet Pablo Neruda. Residence on Earth came out in three volumes, in 1933, 1935, and 1947. Neruda wrote the book over a span of two decades, from 1925 until 1945.

The first volume of Residence on Earth was published by Nascimento on 16 February 1933 in an edition of 100 copies. In a letter to his friend and fellow writer Héctor Eandi, Neruda wrote 'Residencia en la tierra is being printed at this very moment in a luxury edition of just 100 copies, by Nascimento. It will be a stupendous edition. You can count on one copy, the only I'll be able to send to Argentina. It will cost 50 Chilean dollars and I don't think that it will be on sale in Buenos Aires.'

Collections in Residence on Earth:

- Series I (1925–1931)
  - Dream Horse
  - Savor
  - Ars Poetica
  - Burial in the East
  - Gentleman Alone
  - Ritual of My Legs
  - Nocturnal Collection
- Series II (1931–1935)
  - Walking Around
  - Ode with a Lament
  - Alberto Rojas Jiménez Comes Flying
  - There's No Forgetting: Sonata
- Series III (1935–1945)
  - From: The Woes and the Furies
  - A Few Things Explained
  - How Spain Was
