= Roxas =

Roxas may refer to:

== Places in the Philippines ==
=== Cities and municipalities ===
- Roxas City, capital of Capiz
- Roxas, Isabela
- Roxas, Oriental Mindoro
- Roxas, Palawan
- Roxas, Zamboanga del Norte

=== Roads ===
- Roxas Boulevard
- Roxas Avenue, Davao City
- Paseo de Roxas

=== Others ===
- Roxas Airport

== People ==
=== Surname ===
- Gerardo Roxas y Luis (fl. 1839–1891), also known as Gerardo Roxas I, Filipino servant during the Spanish Colonial Era
- Manuel Roxas (1892–1948), former President of the Philippines and son of Gerardo Roxas y Arroyo
- Trinidad Roxas (1900–1995), former First Lady of the Philippines and wife of Manuel Roxas
- Gerardo Roxas (1924–1982), also known as Gerry Roxas, Filipino politician and son of Manuel Roxas
- Mar Roxas (born 1957), Filipino politician and son of Gerardo Roxas
- Gerardo Roxas Jr. (1960–1993), popularly known as Dinggoy Roxas, Filipino politician and son of Gerardo Roxas
- Juno Roxas (born 1967), Australian musician and actor
- Rogelio Roxas (fl. 1971–1993), Filipino treasure hunter
- Jake Roxas (born 1977), Filipino actor
- Van Roxas (born 1989), Filipino actor and television personality

=== Fictional characters ===
- Roxas (Kingdom Hearts), a character from the Kingdom Hearts video game series

== See also ==
- Rojas, reformed spelling
- President Roxas (disambiguation)
- Roxa (Canhabaque), Guinea-Bissau; an island
- Roxà (Rosà), Vincenza, Veneto, Italy; a town
