= Gustavo Rojas =

Gustavo Rojas may refer to:

- Gustavo Rojas Pinilla (1900–1975), President of Colombia, 1953–1957
- Gustavo Rojas (footballer) (born 1988), Colombian football defender for Bogotá F.C
- Gustavo Rojas (golfer) (born 1967), Argentinian golfer
