= Rojas (disambiguation) =

Rojas is a Spanish-language surname.

Rojas may also refer to:

== Places ==
=== Antarctica ===
- Rojas Cove, cove on the coast of Greenwich Island in the South Shetland Islands, Antarctica
- Rojas Peak, Lemaire Island, Danco Coast, Graham Land, Antarctica

=== Europe ===
- Rojas, Province of Burgos, a municipality and town located in Castile and León, Spain
- Rojas novads, a municipality in Courland, Latvia

=== Latin America ===
- Cristóbal Rojas Municipality, Miranda, a municipality in the Venezuelan state of Miranda
- Rojas, Buenos Aires, a town located in the north-east of the Buenos Aires Province, Argentina
- Rojas de Cuauhtémoc, a town and municipality in Oaxaca in south-western Mexico
- Rojas Municipality, a municipality in the Venezuelan state of Barinas
- Rojas Partido, a partido located in the north of Buenos Aires Province in Argentina

== Other uses ==
- Ernesto Rojas Commandos, a small guerrilla group in Colombia
- Estadio General Pablo Rojas, a football stadium in Barrio Obrero in Asunción, Paraguay
- Rojas Magallanes metro station, an elevated metro station in Santiago, Chile

== See also ==
- Teniente Cesar Lopez Rojas District, one of six districts of the province Alto Amazonas in Peru

== See also ==
- Roja (disambiguation)
- Roxas (disambiguation), archaic spelling
