= Roja =

Roja may refer to:

== Film and television ==
- Roja (film), a 1992 Tamil-language film by director Mani Ratnam
  - Roja (soundtrack), a soundtrack album from the film
- Roja (Tamil TV series), a 2018 soap opera
- Roja (Telugu TV series), a 2019 soap opera
- Roja (Philippine TV series), a 2025 Philippine action drama

== People ==
- Roja Chamankar, an Iranian poet
- Roja Selvamani, an Indian actress and politician
- Gheorghe Constantin Roja, an Aromanian doctor, philologist and historian

== Places ==
- Roja, Latvia, a settlement in Roja Municipality, Latvia

== See also ==
- Rojas (disambiguation)
