= Nobuhiko Jimbo =

Japanese military officer (1900–1978)

- 神保 信彦
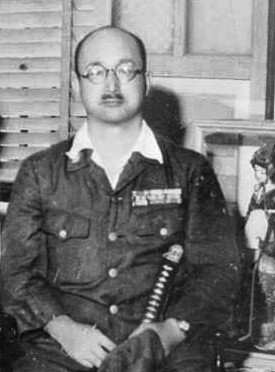
- Lt. Col. Nobuhiko Jimbo in 1943
- Born: January 1, 1900; Yamagata, Yamagata, Japan
- Died: 1978 (aged 78)
- Military career
- Allegiance: Empire of Japan
- Branch: Imperial Japanese Army
- Service years: 1914–1945
- Rank: Lieutenant colonel
- Conflicts: Second Sino-Japanese War; Philippines campaign (1941–1942)

Nobuhiko Jimbo KCR (神保 信彦, Jinbo Nobuhiko; January 1, 1900 – 1978) was a Japanese officer of the Imperial Japanese Army during World War II. He is best known for his actions in preventing the execution of future Philippine president Manuel Roxas during the Japanese occupation of the Philippines.

After the war, Jimbo was spared execution in China following an appeal by President Roxas. In his later years, he worked as a trader and became an advocate for post-war reconciliation and stronger relations between Japan and the Philippines.

== Biography ==
Jimbo was born on January 1, 1900, at Kazumicho, Yamagata, Yamagata Prefecture, as the second son of Bunji and Sada Jimbo. He entered the Sendai Local Military Preparatory School in September 1914 and graduated from the 33rd class of the Imperial Japanese Army Academy in October 1921. He attempted to enter the Army War College twice, but failed both times because he quarreled with the examiners during his interviews. By 1930, Jimbo was serving at the Tokyo Akasaka Infantry 1st Regiment and later became company commander of the Manchurian Independent Garrison in 1936.

=== World War II ===
By 1939, Jimbo was a battalion commander of the Infantry 77th Regiment, participating in various battles in Northern China. He was promoted to Lieutenant Colonel in February 1942, joined the invasion of Lingayen Gulf in March, and fought on the western coast of Bataan in April. Following the fall of Corregidor, Jimbo was adjutant of the 10th Independent Garrison in Mindanao.

At the same time, Manuel Roxas, who had been designated as successor to President Manuel L. Quezon, had just escaped from Corregidor where he was working with Quezon, but was captured by Japanese forces in April 1942 while on his way to secret pickup point where a submarine would take him to Australia. Roxas was then sent to a prisoner camp in Malaybalay, Bukidnon. Upon learning of his identity, the Japanese transferred Roxas to the mayor's house in Davao City where Jimbo met him for the first time.

Jimbo was tasked by headquarters to convince Roxas to join the Philippine Executive Commission and help restore peace and order in the country. Conversing through an interpreter, Jimbo spent three days convincing Roxas to join the Japanese administration, to no avail. Instead of resenting him, Jimbo grew to admire and respect Roxas for his resolve and intelligence.

On June 22, 1942, Jimbo's superior, Major General Torao Ikuta, received an order from the chief-of-staff of the Fourteenth Army ordering him to "execute secretly and immediately Manuel Roxas, former Finance Minister and Speaker of the Chamber of Deputies, now under your arrest." Both Ikuta and Jimbo balked at the order. They discussed it but were unable to reach a decision. Unwilling to carry out the execution, Ikuta ordered Jimbo to assume full responsibility of Roxas. Defying direct orders, Jimbo drove Roxas and another high-ranking captive (a governor) to a small village outside Davao and instructed his men to keep the two Filipinos safe. Ikuta and Jimbo had hoped that, in time, the execution order would be forgotten by those that had issued it in Manila. Eventually, an officer from Manila discovered the ruse and told Jimbo that he was to be court-martialed for his "high-handed" actions, though he was not put under arrest.

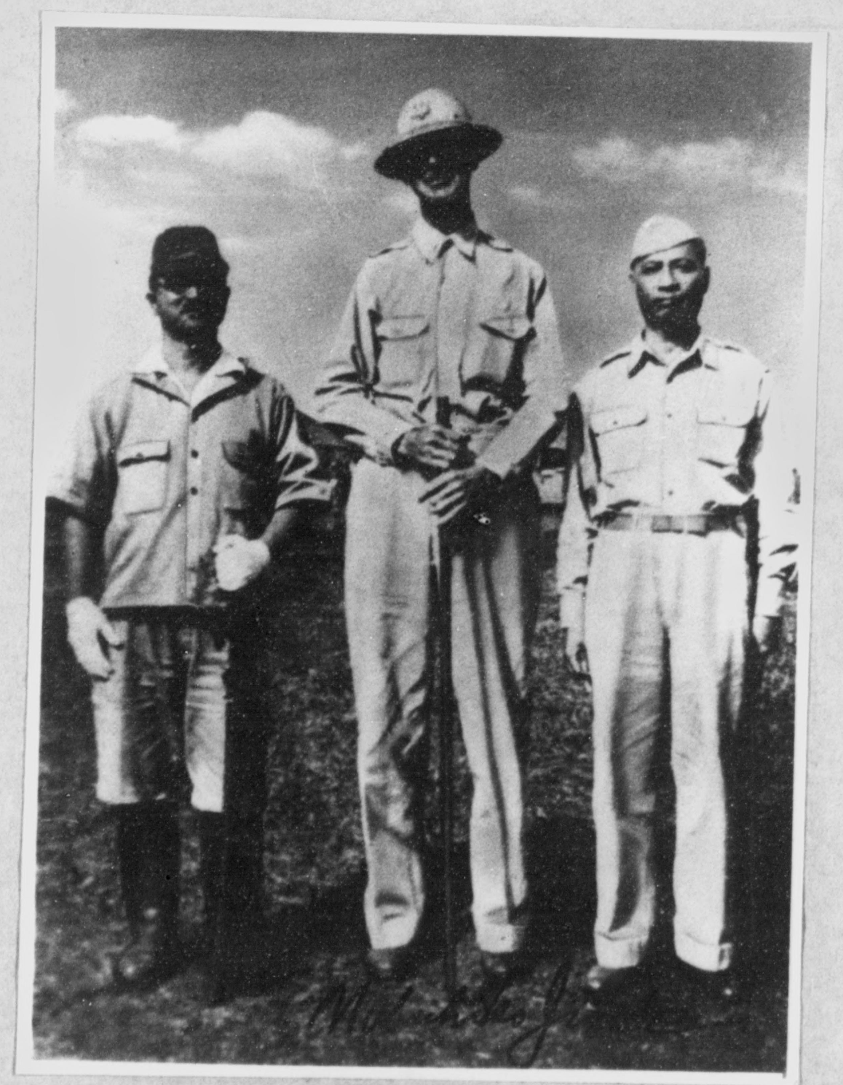
Jimbo (left), Gen. William F. Sharp (center) and Roxas (right) at Malaybalay prison camp, 1942.

Jimbo flew from Davao to Manila to directly confront General Masaharu Homma, who was out of the office at the time. Homma's chief-of-staff Takaji Wachi met Jimbo and said Homma never issued an order to execute Roxas, and that the general was furious after learning that Chief Justice José Abad Santos and the Chinese consul-general were executed. Wachi went to the office of Major General Yoshihide Hayashi demanding to know who gave the order, and then called on Jimbo to show the original copy of the execution order, which bore Hayashi's stamp. Hayashi and the other staff officers eventually confessed that they had stamped the order "without giving it too much thought." Homma issued another order to rescind the execution of Roxas and instead employ him "in the service of placation of the people."

Upon his return to Davao, Jimbo was alarmed to find out that in the meantime Ikuta had sent Roxas to Malaybalay for execution, as he didn't want Roxas to be executed within Davao. Jimbo flew to Malaybalay immediately to prevent Roxas' execution. Jimbo visited Roxas at the Malaybalay prison camp frequently to give extra food and deliver letters. Wachi then ordered Jimbo to secretly bring Roxas to Manila, where he returned home to his family in Taft Avenue.

Because of his merciful actions towards Roxas and other Filipinos, Jimbo was looked down upon by other staff officers and by the chief of the Kempeitai. In February 1944, Jimbo was transferred to the northern Chinese front and was appointed adjutant of the Forty-Third Army which mostly consisted of poorly trained and poorly equipped reservists. He was also assigned as the initial commandant of the Weihsien Internment Camp, where he was noted for being more restrained in using intimidation and punishment compared to counterparts in similar camps. After Japan's surrender, Jimbo was arrested on February 15, 1946, by the National Revolutionary Army in Jinan and charged as a war criminal.

=== Request for clemency by Roxas ===
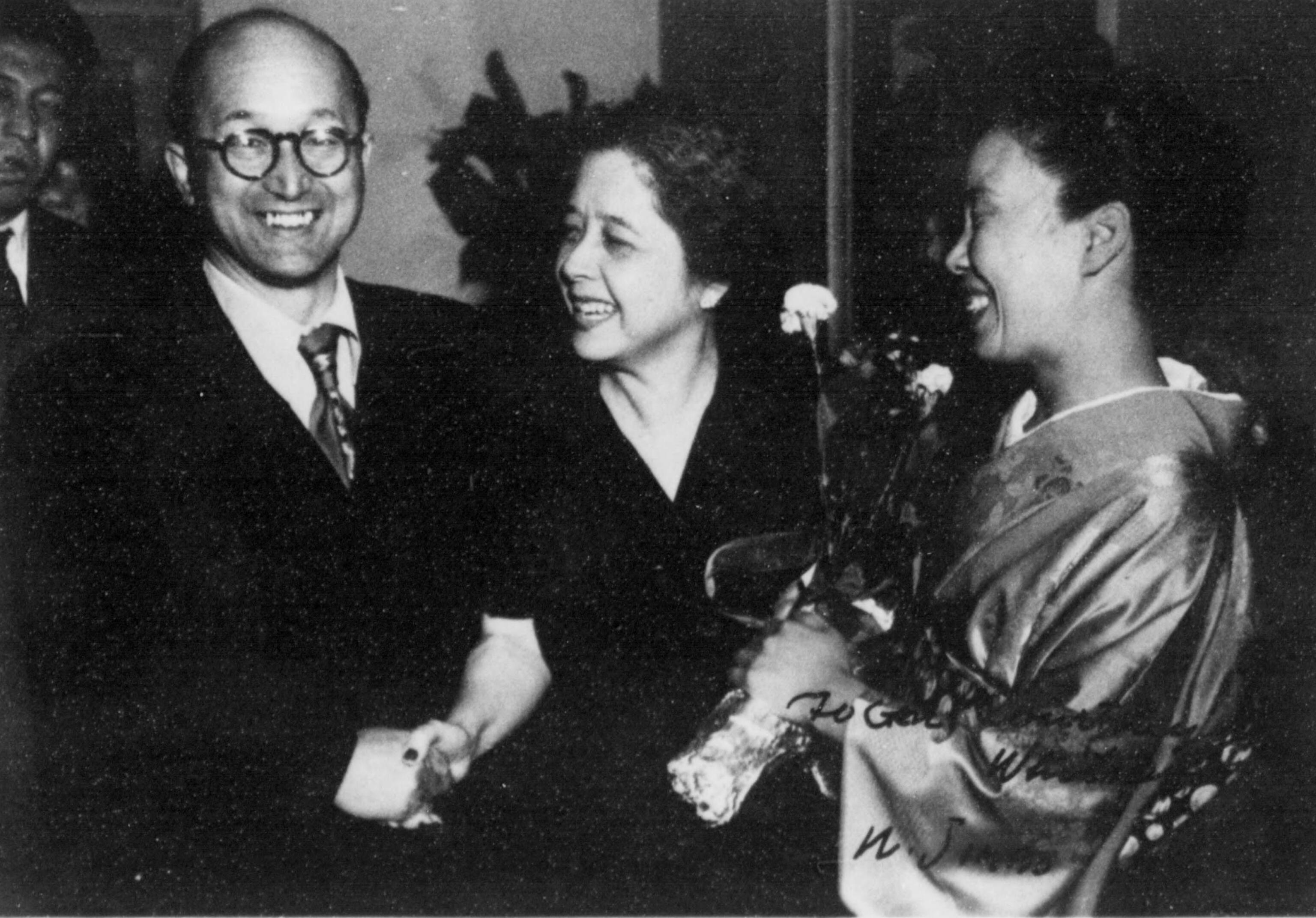
Jimbo (left), his wife Ryuko (right) and former first lady Trinidad de Leon-Roxas (center) meeting on April 21, 1950, in Tokyo

Manuel Roxas was elected president in the 1946 Philippine presidential election. From Jimbo’s wife, Ryuko, he heard that Jimbo had been imprisoned in China and charged with war crimes. Roxas wrote a personal appeal to Chiang Kai-shek, requesting clemency. Chiang issued a special order for Jimbo's release. Jimbo returned home to Yamagata in Japan in July 1947, where newspaper reporters and photographers were waiting for him at the train station.

Jimbo and Roxas exchanged their final letters on April 9, 1948, with Roxas writing his desire to visit Jimbo as soon as he can and tasking the chairman of the Philippine Delegation to Japan to assist Jimbo's efforts in repairing relations between the Philippines and Japan. Roxas died on April 15, 1948, only five days after sending his final letter. Despite initially wanting to keep the story between him and Roxas private, Jimbo eventually publicized their story in the April 15, 1950, issue of the newspaper Jiji Shimpō, on the 2nd anniversary of Roxas' death. On April 21, 1950, Jimbo and his wife met with Roxas' widow Trinidad de Leon-Roxas in Tokyo as part of the former first lady's international goodwill tour.

=== Post-war activities ===
For three years after his repatriation, Jimbo was "absorbed in self-reflection" and dedicated his time researching about Japanese-Philippine commerce. He appeared in court to testify as a witness during the Yokohama War Crimes Trials.

On May 1, 1949, through a directive issued by Roxas' successor President Elipidio Quirino, Jimbo was given a post as liaison official of the Philippines Mission in Japan. Jimbo was one of the first Japanese allowed to enter the Philippines after the war, returning in February 1952 at the invitation of Roxas' widow. He negotiated with President Quirino and foreign affairs secretary Joaquín Miguel Elizalde to ensure the safe repatriation of Japanese soldiers remaining in the Philippines, while the Philippine government maintained that no Japanese soldiers were in the country. Jimbo worked with the Philippine Constabulary to convince Japanese holdouts in Lubang Island to surrender by flying in a small plane that made low-level passes at the island, dropped leaflets, and pleaded at the holdouts to turn themselves. Jimbo also regularly visited convicted Japanese war criminals who were imprisoned in the New Bilibid Prison in Muntinlupa, including General Kiyotake Kawaguchi and General Shizuo Yokoyama.

In 1959, Jimbo published the book Dawn of the Philippines detailing his experiences during the Philippines campaign and the orders they were given to commit atrocities during the Bataan Death March. He helped establish the Japan-Philippines Friendship Association (later known as the Rizal Society of Japan), serving as society president. He also established the Jimboras Company, an export-import business, and was key to securing a $2 million deal to import Philippine bananas after meeting with the Department of Commerce and Industry in 1960. He also wrote a book on the Philippine banana industry in 1962. Jimbo died sometime in 1978.

== Personal life ==
Jimbo married his wife Ryuko Uyematsu on May 8, 1929. Together, they had two sons and three daughters.

Jimbo was a Catholic, which motivated him to spare Roxas from what he called an "unjust" execution and to treat other prisoners humanely. While stationed in Mindanao, Jimbo was also noted for dining with priests and ensuring their well treatment.

He was also an anti-communist and had openly supported the Philippine government's efforts in suppressing the Hukbalahap rebellion.

The novelist Yūzō Yamamoto, a personal friend of Jimbo, described him as having interests in "Western painting, loves literature, and is interested in archaeology." He also described his personality quirks as the reason why he failed to get into the Army War College and why he "was slow to be promoted."

== Honors and legacy ==
Jimbo was conferred the title of Knight of Rizal and was made vice president of the Tokyo chapter of the Order of the Knights of Rizal.

The historical novel Occupation by John Toland includes the fictional character Colonel Heijiro Iwata, which Toland said is directly based on Jimbo.

In 1995, Philippine President Fidel V. Ramos awarded a certificate of commendation to Jimbo's widow Ryuko and his eldest son in recognition of his actions in saving the life of President Roxas.
