= Joel Humberto Rojas Pérez =

Cuban painter (born 1968)

- Born: 1968; Santa Clara, Cuba
- Occupation: Painter

Joel Humberto Rojas Pérez (born March 1968 in Santa Clara, Villa Clara, Cuba) is a Cuban painter. He studied at Instituto Superior de Arte (ISA), Havana, Cuba.

== Individual exhibitions ==
His first exhibition was at the Library of the National Art School with the name Muestra personal in 1986. He presented Joel Rojas as a collateral exhibition to the 5th Havana biennial at Casa del Joven Creador Gallery, Havana, 1994.

== Collective exhibitions ==
His work was part of the Exposición en saludo a la Segunda Bienal de La Habana, Escuela Nacional de Arte, Havana, 1986. His work was seen in the 6th Awarded Saloon, at the Museo Nacional de Bellas Artes, Havana, in 1992.

== Awards ==
He was awarded the Painting Prize at the IV Salón Provincial de Artes Plásticas y Diseño Villa Clara'88, Villa Clara, Cuba, in 1988. He won the Painting Prize at the Salón de Marinas, Galería Leopoldo Romañach, Caibarién, Villa Clara, in 1989. In 1992 he was recognized with a mention at the Awarded Saloon, Museo Nacional de Bellas Artes, Havana.
