= Gerardo Roxas y Luis =

Filipino soldier and servant

Gerardo Roxas y Luis (fl. estimated between 1839 and 1887 – April 21, 1891 on Panay, Philippines) was the father of Manuel Roxas, the fifth President of the Philippines. Roxas was also the great-grandfather of former senator and Secretary of the Interior and Local Government, Mar Roxas.

Roxas served as a military soldier and servant in the Spanish Colonial Era in the Philippines.

== Early life ==
Roxas was born to Antonio Roxas (II) and Francesca Luis in Capiz, Panay Island. He was a grandson of Caetano Rojas and the great-grandson of Juan Pablo Rojas y Arroyo (the son of Antonio Rojas y Ureta). He has a brother named Faustino.

== Personal life and death ==
Roxas was married to Rosario Acuña y Villaruz. The couple had two children - Mamerto and Manuel. Manuel was a posthumous child, as Roxas had died after having been mortally wounded by Spanish Guardia Civil before Manuel was born.

== Lineage ==
Roxas was a descendant of the Spaniard Antonio Rojas y Ureta, the brother of Domingo Roxas y Ureta (1782-1843) a pioneer of Philippine nationalism and a progenitor of the Roxas de Ayala and Zobel de Ayala clans)

- Antonio Rojas y Ureta - second great-grandfather
  - Juan Pablo Rojas y Arroyo - great-grandfather
    - Caetano Rojas y Romero - grandfather
      - Antonio Roxas (II) - father
      - Francesca Luis - mother
        - Gerardo Roxas y Luis
          - Manuel Roxas (1892 – 1948) - son; Philippine president
            - Gerardo Manuel Roxas ("Gerry") (1924 – 1982) - grandson; Philippine senator
              - Manuel Roxas II ("Mar") (b. 1957) - great-grandson; Philippine senator, former DILG secretary
              - Gerardo Roxas, Jr. ("Dinggoy") (1960 – 1993) - great-grandson; Philippine congressman
