= Tomás Rojas =

Tomás Rojas may refer to:

- Tomás Rojas (boxer), Mexican boxer
- Tomás Rojas (actor), Mexican actor
- Tomás Rojas (footballer), Paraguayan footballer
