= Luis Rojas =

Luis Rojas may refer to:

- Luis Rojas (footballer, born 1954), Chilean football midfielder
- Luis Rojas (Venezuelan footballer) (born 1963), Venezuelan football defender
- Luis Rojas (swimmer) (born 1979), Venezuelan Olympic swimmer
- Luis Rojas (baseball) (born 1981), Dominican baseball coach
- Luis Rojas (footballer, born 2002), Chilean football midfielder

== See also ==
- Luis Rojas Mena (1917–2009), Mexican bishop of the Roman Catholic Church.
