= Matías Rojas =

Matías Rojas may refer to:

- Matías Rojas (footballer, born 1989), Argentine forward for Ñublense
- Matías Rojas (footballer, born 1991), Argentine midfielder for Deportivo Santaní
- Matías Rojas (footballer, born 1995), Paraguayan midfielder for Inter Miami
- Matías Rojas (footballer, born 1996), Chilean defender for Provincial Ovalle Fútbol Club
