= Alberto Rojas Jiménez =

Chilean poet and journalist (1900–1934)

Alberto Rojas Jiménez (21 July 1900 – 25 May 1934) was a Chilean poet and journalist.

== Early life and education ==
He was born in Valparaíso to Alberto Rojas Guajardo and Elena Jiménez Labarca.

A student of the National Internship Barros Arana, Jiménez studied at the School of Architecture and Fine Arts at the University of Chile, located in Santiago.

== Career ==
His literary output, which is defined primarily as a poet and journalist, began in 1918 with the publication of works in prose in the magazine Zig-Zag under the pseudonym Pierre Lhéry, and ended with his writings published in the newspaper El Correo de Valdivia.

Jiménez was part of the Chilean Literary Generation of the 1920s that included Joaquín Cifuentes Sepúlveda, Armando Ulloa, Alejandro Vasquez, Rubén Azócar, Raimundo Echevarría Larrazabal, and Pablo Neruda.

Jiménez was a virtuoso draftsman, influenced by Marc Chagall's body of work. His drawings influenced the aesthetic style of and contributed to the spread of painters and sculptors while he directed and collaborated with them for the newspaper Clarity (whose directors in its initial period were Raúl Silva Castro and Rafael Yepez).

Jiménez also wrote for numerous national magazines and newspapers. In the Journal of Education, he contributed as an art critic and made contributions as a poet and articles in which he expressed his knowledge of the art of the time. He wrote in the journals Gaceta de Chile and Magazine of Art. Also, the daily La Nación had him as editor at "Montparnasse" page, where he collaborated on occasion with Luis Vargas Rosas and Juan Emar. In addition, in the daily La República de Valdivia, he was charged with the "Kaleidoscope" column.

In 1923, Jiménez traveled to Paris with his friend, the painter Abelardo Bustamante Paschin. There he, Paschin, and Magallanes Moure developed unusual trades, such as a cartoonist in bars and cafés or lender of a lens on the streets so that passersby could see the stars.

Jiménez wrote under the pseudonyms: Zain Gimel, Pierre Hugo Lhéry, and Ramiel.

In April 1930, he published the book Chileans in Paris, his only published work. The book chronicles his impressions of people and a season of experiences, covering the multitude of Chileans seen parading through the cities of Europe. Among the characters therein: Vicente Huidobro, Julio Ortiz de Zarate, Oscar Fabres, Abelardo Bustamante Paschin, and Rafael Silva.

== Death and legacy ==
The poet died in Santiago on 25 May 1934.

Sixty years later, Oreste Plath and the National Library of Chile published an autobiographical account and collection of his work, entitled Alberto Rojas Jiménez Walked Around Dawn (which may be downloaded in its original language).

Chilean poet Pablo Neruda immortalized Jiménez in the poem "Alberto Rojas Jimenez Comes Flying". The poem would later be the inspiration for the form and content of Poet Laureate and Pulitzer Prize-winning poet Elizabeth Bishop's poem set in Brooklyn, New York, entitled "An Invitation to Marianne Moore".

== Works ==
- Chileans in Paris, chronicles, 1930
- Charter – Ocean. poetry, posthumous publication
