= Gustavo Rojas (footballer) =

Colombian footballer (born 1988)

Personal information
- Full name: Gustavo Andrés Rojas Calderón
- Date of birth: February 6, 1988 (age 38)
- Place of birth: Bogotá, Colombia
- Height: 1.77 m (5 ft 10 in)
- Position: Right-back

Team information
- Current team: Bogotá

Senior career*
Years	Team	Apps	(Gls)
2005–2009	Millonarios		
2009–2011	Atlético Huila	27	(1)
2012–	Bogotá	10	(2)
- * Club domestic league appearances and goals as of 5 November 2012

Gustavo Andrés Rojas Calderón (born February 6, 1988) is a Colombian football defender, who currently plays for Bogotá F.C. in the Categoría Primera B. He has played for the U-20.
