= Jack (given name) =

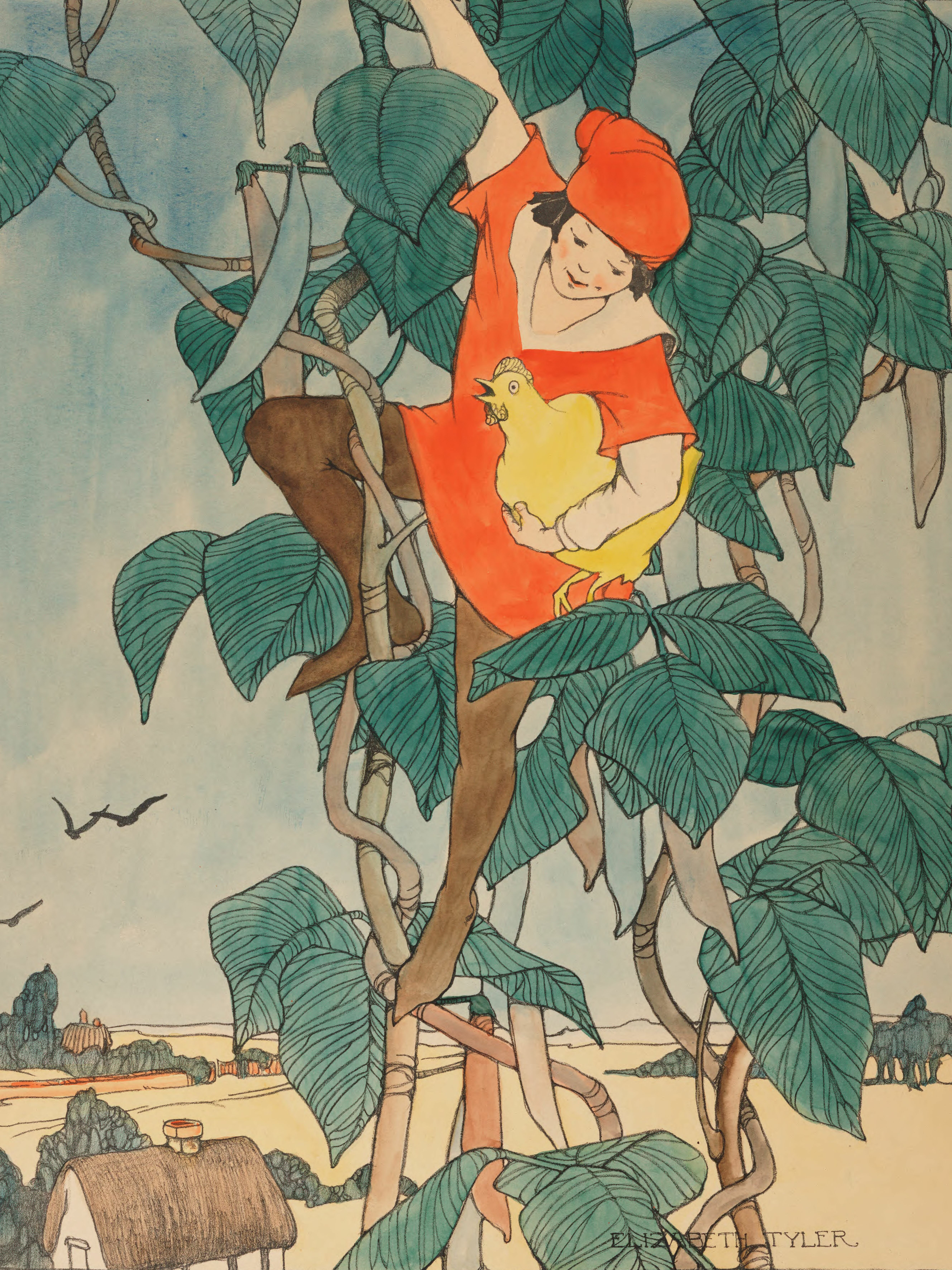
- Illustration of Jack from the English fairy tale Jack and the Beanstalk
- Pronunciation: /dʒæk/
- Gender: Unisex
- Language: English

Origin
- Language: English
- Origin: Middle English, indirect diminutive of "John" or from an anglicized form of French "Jacques"
- Meaning: "Yahweh is gracious", "holder of the heel" or "supplanter"
- Region of origin: England

Other names
- Nicknames: Jackie, Jacky, Jay
- Related names: John, James, Jacob, Jackson, Jacques, Jacqueline, Jock

Jack is popular in the countries shown in green

Jack is a given name of English origin. In modern usage, Jack is often a given name on its own, although it can be used as a diminutive of other given names. Since the late 20th century, Jack has become one of the most common names for boys in many English-speaking countries. Jack is also used to a much lesser extent as a female name, often as a shortened version of Jacqueline.

The word "jack" is also commonly used in other contexts in English for many occupations, objects, and actions, linked to the use of the word as a metaphor for a common man.

== Origin ==
Jack is derived from the Middle English diminutive Jackin, an alteration of Jankin. Jankin is a diminutive of Jan which is derived from the Old French name Jehan, a form of John. Alternatively, it may be derived from an anglicisation of Jacques, the French form of the name James or Jacob.

Both the name and the word "jack" were long used as a term to refer to any man (including boys), especially of the common classes.

== Frequency ==
In several English-speaking countries, Jack has become used as a formal given name and is now more popular than John, James, or Jacob. During the first decade of the 21st century, Jack was the most common given name for boys in the United Kingdom, Ireland, and Australia, and grew in popularity in the United States and Canada.

Jack appeared on the lists of the most frequently used male-baby names in the UK for 2003–2007.

From 2000 to 2024, Jack was either the number 1 or 2 most popular name for baby boys in Ireland.

In 2008, 2009, 2010, and 2013, Jack was the most common name given to boys in Australia.

The frequency of Jack as a baby name in the US has steadily increased from the 160–170 rank prior to 1991 to a rank of 11 in 2021.

In 2022, it was the tenth most common name given to boys in Canada.

== Other uses in English ==
The name Jack is unusual in the English language for its frequent use as a noun or verb for many common objects and actions, and in many compound words and phrases.

Examples include implements, such as a car jack, knucklebones (the game jacks), or the jack in bowls.

The word is also used in other words and phrases such as: apple jack, hijack, jack of clubs (playing card), jack straw (scarecrow), jack tar (sailor), jack-in-the-box, jack-of-all-trades, Jack the lad, jack o'lantern, jackdaw, jackhammer, jackknife, jackpot, lumberjack, Union Jack, etc.

The history of the word is linked to the name being used as a by-name for a man.

== People with the given name ==
- Jack Abbott (coach) (1873–1918), American athlete and coach
- Jack Abbott (footballer) (1943–2002), British association football player
- Jack Abbott (politician) (born 1990), British Labour Party politician
- Jack Henry Abbott (1944–2002), American murderer and author
- Jack I. Abecassis, American scholar of French literature
- Jack Abeillé (1873–1939), French painter and illustrator
- Jack Abel (1927–1996), American comic book artist
- Jack Abendschan (1942–2025), American gridiron football player
- Jack Abernathy (1876–1941), United States Marshal
- Jack Abraham (born 1986), American businessman
- Jack Abrahams (1860–1922), English footballer
- Jack Abramoff (born 1959), American lobbyist
- Jack Absalom (1927–2019), Australian artist
- Jack Acland (1904–1981), New Zealand politician
- Jack Adams (disambiguation), multiple people
- Jack Adler (1917–2011), American comics artist
- Jack Afamasaga (born 1984), Samoan professional rugby league footballer
- Jack Agazarian (1915–1945), British spy
- Jack Aikins (born 2002), American swimmer
- Jack Aitken (born 1995), British-Korean racing driver
- Jack Agüeros (1934–2014), author, playwright, poet and translator
- Jack Aker (born 1940), American Major League Baseball pitcher
- Jack Albertson (1907–1981), American actor
- Jack Anderson (disambiguation), multiple people
- Jack Angel (1930–2021), American actor
- Jack Antonoff (born 1984), American musician and producer
- Jack Arute (born 1950), American sportscaster
- Jack Asher (1916–1991), English cinematographer
- Jack Asselstine (1895–1966), Canadian ice hockey player
- Jack Avery (murder victim) (1911–1940), British War Reserve Constable
- Jack Avery (singer) (born 1999), American singer in the boy band Why Don't We
- Jack Babuscio (1937–1990), American journalist
- Jack Baigrie (1929–2008), Canadian television personality
- Jack Banta (disambiguation), multiple people
- Jack Barakat (born 1988), lead guitarist for punk rock band All Time Low
- Jack Bartley (1909–1929), English footballer
- Jack Baker (born 1942), one half of the first same-sex couple to be married legally with a license that was never revoked
- Jack Bech (born 2002), American football player
- Jack Benny (1894–1974), American comedian, vaudevillian, actor, and violinist
- Jack Black (born 1969), American actor
- Jack Blott (1902–1964), All-American football center and place kicker
- Jack Bouwmeester (born 1999), Australian gridiron football player
- Jack Brodrick (1913–1965), rugby league player
- Jack Brabham (1926–2014), Australian racing driver
- Jack Brickhouse (1916–1998), American sportscaster
- Jack Brisco (1941–2010), American professional wrestler
- Jack Brittain, American professor
- Jack Browning (born 2001), American football player
- Jack Bruce (1943–2014), Scottish musician, composer, and vocalist
- Jack Buck (1924–2002), American sportscaster
- Jack Burtch (1926–2015), American lawyer
- Jack Cade (c. 1420–1450), the leader of a popular revolt against the government of England in 1450
- Jack Campbell (born 1992), American ice hockey goaltender
- Jack W. Carter (1938–2019), American politician
- Jack Catley (born 1945), English footballer
- Jack Bridger Chalker (1918–2014), British artist and teacher
- Jack L. Chalker (1944–2005), American science fiction author
- Jack Charlton (1935–2020), English footballer and manager
- Jack Chesbro (1874–1931), American Major League Baseball pitcher
- Jack T. Chick (1924–2016), American publisher, writer, and comic book artist of evangelical fundamentalist Christian tracts and comic books
- Jack Ciattarelli (born 1961), American politician and businessman
- Jack Cichy (born 1996), American football player
- Jack Cirilo (born 1999), Peruvian footballer
- Jack Clarke (1933–2001), Australian rules footballer and coach in the VFL
- Jack Clement (1931–2013), American singer-songwriter, record producer
- Jack Clifford (disambiguation), several people
- Jack Cock (1893–1966), English footballer
- Jack Colman (1887–1965), New Zealand rugby union player
- Jack E. Conger (1921–2006), American Marine flying ace during World War II
- Jack Kent Cooke (1912–1997), Canadian entrepreneur
- Jack Coombs (1882–1957), Major League Baseball pitcher
- Jack Cork (born 1989), English footballer
- Jack Crawford (disambiguation), multiple people
- Jack Crisp (born 1993), Australian rules footballer
- Jack Cronin (1874–1929), American Major League Baseball pitcher
- Jack Cronin (American football) (1903–1993), American football player
- Jack Crook (born 1993), English basketball player
- Jack Cross (1887–1948), Canadian ice hockey player
- Jack Cushing (born 1996), American baseball player
- Jack Cust (born 1979), American baseball player
- Jack Daly (politician) (1915–1988), Irish politician
- Jack Daniels (disambiguation), multiple people
- Jack Dann (born 1945), American writer
- Jack Carl Dean, better known by alias JaackMaate, British YouTuber
- Jack Dee (born 1961), English stand-up comedian, actor, and writer
- Jack DeJohnette (1942–2025), American jazz drummer, pianist, and composer
- Jack DeLeon (1924–2006), American actor
- Jack Del Rio (born 1963), American football coach
- Jack Della Maddalena (born 1996), Australian MMA fighter
- Jack Dempsey (disambiguation), multiple people
- Jack Dickin (1899–1966), British Olympic swimmer
- Jack Diment (died 1978), Scottish footballer
- Jack Dingle (born 2003), American football player
- Jack Doan (born 1972) American professional wrestling referee
- Jack Dootson (1914–1985), American politician
- Jack Dorsey (born 1976), American technology entrepreneur, co-founder and CEO of Twitter
- Jack Douglass (born 1988), American YouTube comedian of "jacksfilms" fame
- Jack Dowsey (1905–1942), English footballer
- Jack Driscoll (American football) (born 1997), American football player
- Jack Dromey (1948–2022), British Labour Party politician and trade unionist
- Jack Dugger (1923–1988), American football player
- Jack Dugnolle (1914–1977), English footballer
- Jack Duncliffe (born 1947), English footballer
- Jack Dyer (1913–2003), Australian rules footballer and coach, broadcaster and journalist
- Jack Easterby (born 1982 or 1983), American football executive
- Jack Eichel (born 1996), American National Hockey League player
- Jack Eisner (born 1947), Israeli basketball player
- Jack Elam (1920–2003), American actor
- Jack Elder (politician) (born 1949), New Zealand politician
- Jack Ellena (1931–2012), American football player
- Jack Elway (1931–2001), American football player and head coach
- Jack Ely (1943–2015), American guitarist and singer
- Jack Endino (born 1964), producer and musician based in Seattle
- Jack Evans (disambiguation), multiple people
- Jack Faber (1903–1994), American microbiologist and college football and lacrosse coach
- Jack Falahee (born 1989), American actor
- Jack Fellure (1931–2022), American perennial political candidate and engineer
- Jack Fettes (born 2005), British basketball player
- Jack Fingleton (1908–1981), Australian cricketer
- Jack Finney (1911–1995), American author
- Jack Flagerman (1922–2005), American football player
- Jack Flaherty (disambiguation), multiple people
- Jack Flatley (born 1994), English professional boxer
- Jack Fleck (1921–2014), American professional golfer
- Jack Foley (disambiguation), multiple people
- Jack Fortner, Member of the Arkansas House of Representatives
- Jack Fox (disambiguation), multiple people
- Jack Fritz (disambiguation), multiple people
- Jack Fultz (born 1948), American long-distance runner
- Jack Gamble, British footballer
- Joaquín "Jack" García (born 1952), Cuban-American FBI agent
- Jack Garfinkel (1918–2013), American basketball player
- Jack Givens (born 1956), American collegiate and professional basketball player
- Jack Glasscock (1857–1947), American Major League Baseball player
- Jack Gilinsky (born 1996), member of the American pop-rap duo Jack & Jack
- Jack Gingrass (1921–2010), American politician
- Jack Gold (1930–2015), British film and television director
- Jack Goody (1919–2015), British social anthropologist
- Jack Gotta (1929–2013), American-born Canadian football player, coach, and general manager
- Jack Gore (actor) (born 2005), American actor
- Jack Graf (1919–2009), American football and basketball player
- Jack Graney (1886–1978), Canadian Major League Baseball player
- Jack Grant (disambiguation), multiple people
- Jack Dylan Grazer (born 2003), American actor
- Jack Grealish (born 1995), English footballer
- Jack Greenwell (1884–1942), English footballer and manager
- Jack Griffo (born 1996), American actor
- Jack Haden (1914–1996), American football player
- Jack Hale (disambiguation), multiple people
- Jack Haley (disambiguation), multiple people
- Jack Halliday (American football) (1928–2000), American football player
- Jack Ham (born 1948), American football linebacker
- Jack Hand (1912–1995), American sports reporter
- Jack Hanna (born 1947), American zookeeper
- Jack Hannah (1913–1994), American animator, writer, and director of animated shorts
- Jack Harkness (born 2004), Scottish footballer
- Jack Harper (disambiguation), multiple people
- Jack Heflin (born 1998), American football player
- Jack Heinemann, New Zealand academic
- Jack Hennig (born 1946), Canadian singer-songwriter
- Jack Herer (1939–2010), American cannabis activist
- Jack Heyes (1902–?), English footballer
- Jack Hill (disambiguation), multiple people
- Jack Hinchy (born 2003), English footballer
- Jack Hinshelwood (born 2005), English footballer
- Jack Hirsch (born 1941 or 1942), American basketball player and coach
- Jack Hirsh (born 1935), Canadian clinician and scientist
- Jack Hobbs (1882–1963), English cricketer
- Jack Hoffman (American football) (1930–2001), American football player
- Jack Hollington (born 2001), British actor
- Jack Holt (disambiguation), multiple people
- Jack Hopkins, English footballer
- Jack Hughes (disambiguation), multiple people
- Jack Hurley (1897–1972), American boxing promoter
- Jack Hurley (baseball) (born 2002), American baseball player
- Jack Huston (born 1982), English actor
- Jack Hyles (1926–2001), figure in the American Independent Baptist movement
- Jack Iddon (1902–1946), English cricketer
- Jack Ikin (1918–1984), English cricketer
- Jack Ingram (disambiguation), multiple people
- Jack Iroga (born 1986), sprinter from the Solomon Islands
- Jack Irons (born 1962), American musician
- Jack Irvin (1929–2008), American politician
- Jack Ivankovic (born 2007), Canadian ice hockey player
- Jack Iverson (1915–1973), Australian cricketer
- Jack Jacobs (disambiguation), multiple people
- Jack Jeffery (racing driver) (1938–2005), American racing driver
- Jack Jewsbury (born 1981), American soccer player
- Jack Johnson (disambiguation), multiple people
- Jack Jones (disambiguation), multiple people
- Jack Kamen (1920–2008), American illustrator
- Jack Katz (businessman) (born c. 1943), American businessman
- Jack Keane (born 1943), four-star general, former Vice Chief of Staff of the United States Army, and defense analyst
- Jack D. Keene (born 1947), American professor
- Jack Kemp (1935–2009), American politician and collegiate and professional footballer
- John F. Kennedy (1917–1963), American president, often called "Jack"
- Jack Kerouac (1922–1969), American novelist
- Jack Ketch (died 1686), English executioner employed by King Charles II
- Jack Kevorkian (1928–2011), American doctor
- Jack Kilby (1923–2005), American electrical engineer
- Jack Kirby (disambiguation), multiple people
- Jack Klugman (1922–2012), American actor
- Jack Kornfield (born 1945), American author and teacher in the vipassana movement in American Theravada Buddhism
- Jack Kotelawala (1910–1992), Sri Lankan Ambassador to the Soviet Union from 1969 to 1970
- Jack Kruger (born 1994), American professional baseball player
- Jack Ladyman (born 1947), American politician
- Jack Lambert (disambiguation), multiple people
- Jack Langer (born 1948/1949), American basketball player and investment banker
- Jack Larsen (baseball) (born 1995), American baseball player
- Jack Larson (1928–2015), American actor
- Jack Lausch, American football player
- Jack Layton (1950–2011), Canadian politician
- Jack Lea (born 1994), rugby player
- Jack Leathersich (born 1990), American baseball player
- Jack Le Brocq (born 1992), Australian racing driver
- Jack Lemmon (1925–2001), American actor
- Jack de Leon, (1902–1956), British theatre manager, impresario and playwright
- Jack Lew (born 1955), American government administrator, attorney, and 76th United States Secretary of the Treasury
- Jack Donald Lewis (born 1938), wealthy zookeeper who disappeared in 1997
- Jack Leyfield (1923–2014), English footballer
- Jack Lindsay (1900–1990), Australian-born British writer and poet
- Jack Lindsay (footballer) (1921–2006), Scottish footballer
- Jack Loach (born 1942), British businessman
- Jack London (disambiguation), multiple people
- Jack Lord (1920–1998), American actor
- Jack Lowden (born 1990), Scottish actor
- Jack Lynch (disambiguation), multiple people
- Jack Ma (born 1964), Chinese entrepreneur and philanthropist
- Jack Mack (1881–1960), Australian rules footballer
- Jack Mara (1908–1965), co-owner of the New York Giants football franchise
- Jack Markell (born 1960), American politician
- Jack Marley (born 2002), Irish boxer
- Jack Marsh (c. 1874–1916), Australian first-class cricketer
- Jack Mates (1870–????), Welsh footballer
- Jack Mayfield (born 1990), American baseball player
- Jack McBrayer (born 1973), American comedic actor
- Jack McCall (1852/1853–1877), murderer of Old West legend Wild Bill Hickok
- Jack McConnell (born 1960), Scottish politician, First Minister of Scotland 2001–2007
- Jack McCoy (1937–2009), American racing driver
- Jack D. McCoy (1928–2020), American racing driver
- Jack McCracken (1912–1958), American basketball player in the 1930s and 1940s
- Jack McFetridge (1869–1917), Major League Baseball pitcher
- Jack McKinney (basketball) (1935–2018), American basketball coach
- Jack McKinney (writer), pseudonym used by American authors James Luceno and Brian Daley
- Jack McVite (1932–1967), British criminal
- Jack Meanwell (1919–2005), Canadian artist and art teacher
- Jack Meltzer (1921–2010), American academic
- Jack Merriott (1901–1968), English writer and artist
- Jack Moehle, American academic
- Jack Moore (disambiguation), multiple people
- Jack Morelli (born 1962), American comic book letterer
- Jack Morrell (born 1955), American boxer
- Jack Morris (born 1955), American Major League Baseball pitcher
- Jack Maumbe Mukhwana (1939–2017), Ugandan politician
- Jack Mulcair (1889–1953), Canadian ice hockey player
- Jack Nance (1943–1996), American actor
- Jack Narz (1922–2008), American television announcer and game show host
- Jack Nasher (born 1979), German business psychologist, author, and professor
- Jack Francis Needham (1842–1924), British police officer
- Jack Nelson (disambiguation), multiple people
- Jack Neo (born 1960), Singaporean film and television actor, host, and director
- Jack Nevin, American lawyer
- Jack Newman (disambiguation), multiple people
- Jack Nicholson (born 1937), American actor
- Jack Nicklaus (born 1940), American golfer
- Jack Nitzsche (1937–2000), American musician, arranger, producer, songwriter, and film score composer
- Jack Novak (born 1953), American professional footballer
- Jack Null (1924–2003), American college basketball coach
- Jack Oakie (1903–1978), American actor
- Jack O'Connell (disambiguation), multiple people
- Jack Ohman (born 1960), American editorial cartoonist
- Jack Okey (1889–1963), American art director
- Jack Oleck (1914–1981), American novelist and comic book writer
- Jack Olsen (1925–2002), American journalist and author
- Jack O'Neill (disambiguation), multiple people
- Jack Osbourne (born 1985), English media personality
- Jack O'Shea (born 1957), Irish Gaelic footballer
- Jack Otter, American journalist
- Jack Owen (disambiguation), multiple people
- Jack Oyugi, Kenyan entrepreneur
- Jack Paar (1918–2004), American author, comedian, and talk show host
- Jack Palance (1919–2006), American actor
- Jack Pardee (1936–2013), American National Football League player and head coach
- Jack Parsons (disambiguation), multiple people
- Jack Patera (1933–2018), American footballer and coach in the National Football League
- Jack Paterson (disambiguation), multiple people
- Jack Paton (1881–1935), Scottish cricketer
- Jack Pearsall (1915–1982), Canadian politician
- Jack Peart (1888–1948), English footballer
- Jack Pickersgill (1905–1997), Canadian civil servant and politician
- Jack Piddington (1910–1997), Australian research physicist and radio scientist
- Jack Poorbaugh (1919–1987), American politician
- Jack Powell (disambiguation), multiple people
- Jack Joseph Puig, American music engineer and producer
- Jack Pyle (1909–1987), American stage magician
- Jack Quaid (born 1992), American actor
- Jack Quinlan (1927–1965), American sportscaster
- Jack Quinn (disambiguation), multiple people
- Jack N. Rakove (born 1947), American historian, author, professor, and Pulitzer Prize winner
- Jack Ralite (1928–2017), French politician
- Jack Rampton (1920–1994), British civil servant
- Jack Ramsay (1925–2014), American basketball coach
- Jack Reed (disambiguation), multiple people
- Jack Regan (disambiguation), multiple people
- Jack Remmington (born 1994), English influencer and presenter
- Jack Rieley (1942–2015), American record producer
- Jack Riewoldt (born 1988), Australian rules footballer
- Jack River (born Holly Rankin, 1991), Australian singer-songwriter
- Jack Rogers (born 1937), American politician
- Jack Rosenthal (1931–2004), English playwright
- Jack Roush (born 1942), American founder, CEO, and co-owner of Roush Fenway Racing
- Jack Ruby (1911–1967), American nightclub operator who killed Lee Harvey Oswald
- Jack Russell (disambiguation), multiple people
- Jack Sack (1902–1980), American football player and coach
- Jack Saul, South African-Israeli tennis player
- Jack Sawyer (born 2002), American football player
- Jack Shepherd (disambiguation), multiple people
- Jack Shirai (died 1937), Japanese-American activist, trade unionist, and soldier
- Jack Shonkoff, American pediatrician
- Jack Sikma (born 1955), American National Basketball Association center
- Jack Snelling (born 1972), Australian politician
- Jack Sock (born 1992), American professional tennis and pickleball player
- Jack Soren, pen name of Martin Richard Soderstrom, Canadian writer
- Jack Souther (1924–2014), American-Canadian geologist
- Jack Stauber (born 1996), American musician, YouTuber and animator
- Jack Steinberger (1921–2020), American physicist
- Jack Stoll (born 1998), American football player
- Jack Strand (born 2004), American football player
- Jack Straw (born 1946), British politician
- Jack Sullivan (disappeared 2025), Canadian missing person
- Jack Suwinski (born 1998), American baseball player
- Jack Swagger (born 1982), American wrestler
- Jack Sweeney, American programmer and entrepreneur
- Jack Swift (born 1985), Australian paratriathlete
- Jack Taggart (1950–2022), Canadian ice hockey player
- Jack Talty, Irish musician
- Jack Tatum (1948–2010), American National Football League player
- Jack Taylor (born 1990), American basketball player
- Jack Tchienchou (born 2005), American football player
- Jack Thrasher (1938–2017), American immunotoxicologist
- Jack Tighe (1913–2002), American Major League Baseball head coach
- Jack Titus (1908–1978), Australian rules footballer
- Jack Tocho (born 1995), American football player
- Jack Townend (1918–2005), British illustrator and graphic artist
- Jack Trice (1902–1923), American football player
- Jack Troy (1928–1995), Australian rugby league footballer
- Jack Turner (born 2002), English professional boxer
- Jack Twyman (1934–2012), American basketball player and sports broadcaster
- Jack Ulrich (1890–1927), Canadian ice hockey player
- Jack Underman (1925–1969), American basketball player
- Jack Underwood (1894–1936), American football player
- Jack Unruh (1935–2016), American commercial illustrator
- Jack Unterweger (1950–1994), Austrian serial killer
- Jack Urban (1928–2006), Major League Baseball pitcher
- Jack Vale (disambiguation), multiple people
- Jack Valenti (1921–2007), American political advisor and lobbyist, president of the Motion Picture Association of America
- Jack Van Berg (1936–2017), American Hall-of-Fame horse trainer
- Jack Van Impe (1931–2020), American televangelist
- Jack Vance (1916–2013), American science fiction, fantasy, and mystery writer
- Jack Veal (born 2007), British child actor
- Jack Vettriano (1951–2025), Scottish painter
- Jack Victory (born 1964), American professional wrestler and manager
- Jack Vidgen (born 1997), Australian singer
- Jack Viney (born 1994), Australian rules footballer
- Jack Voigt (born 1966), Major League Baseball outfielder
- Jack Vosti (1903–1977), Australian rules footballer
- Jack Waite (born 1969), American tennis player
- Jack Walker (1929–2000), British industrialist, and owner of Blackburn Rovers F.C.
- Jack Ward, Canadian ice hockey player
- Jack Warden (1920–2006), American actor
- Jack Warner (disambiguation)
- Jack Webb (1920–1982), American actor, television producer, director, and screenwriter
- Jack Wenninger (born 2002), American baseball player
- Jack Welch (disambiguation)
- Jack Whitam, English actor
- Jack White (disambiguation)
- Jack Whitehall (born 1988), English comedian, presenter, actor, and writer
- Jack Whitman (died 2004), American paralympic archer and dartcher
- Jack Wild (1952–2006), English actor
- Jack Wilkie-Jans, Aboriginal affairs advocate
- Jack Williamson (1908–2006), American science fiction writer
- Jack Wilshere (born 1992), English footballer
- Jack Wilson (1937–1997), Irish novelist
- Jack Winkler (born 1998), American baseball player
- Jack Witikka (1916–2002), Finnish film director
- Jack Arthur Wood Jr. (1923–2005), American state senator of Idaho
- Jack Wong (born 1998), tennis player from Hong Kong
- Jack Woodbridge (1956–2023), American pianist, singer and composer
- Jack Liangjie Xu, co-president and chief technology officer of SINA Corporation
- Jack Yan (born 1972), New Zealand publisher, designer, and businessman
- Jack Yang, American computer scientist and biophysicist
- Jack Yarber (born 1967), American singer, songwriter, and guitarist
- Jack Yeandle (born 1989), English rugby union player
- Jack Yellen (1892–1991), American lyricist and screenwriter
- Jack Yerman (born 1939), American former sprinter
- Jack Yost (born 1945), American politician
- Jack Youngblood (born 1950), American college and professional footballer
- Jack Youngerman (1926–2020), American artist
- Jack Zajac (born 1929), American artist
- Jack Zduriencik (born 1951), Major League Baseball general manager
- Jack Zelig (1888–1912), American gangster
- Jack Zeller (1883–1969), American baseball executive
- Jack Zhao (born 1969), Chinese contract bridge player
- Jack Ziebell (born 1991), Australian rules footballer
- Jack Zilly (1921–2009), American football player
- Jack Zipes (born 1937), American professor of German
- Jack Zouhary (born 1951), American federal judge
- Jack Zunz (1923–2018), British civil engineer, former chairman of Ove Arup & Partners

== People with the nickname ==
- Papa Jack (born 1982), Filipino radio DJ and TV personality

== Fictional characters ==
=== Folklore and nursery rhymes ===
- Jack Frost, bringer of winter
- Jack (hero), an archetypal English hero of such fairy tales as "Jack and the Beanstalk"
- Characters in English nursery rhymes and proverbs, including:
  - "Jack and Jill"
  - "Jack Be Nimble"
  - "Jack Spratt"
  - "Little Jack Horner"

=== Films and novels ===
- Jack Aubrey, an officer in the Royal Navy of the Napoleonic Wars, one of the two main characters in the Aubrey–Maturin series by Patrick O'Brian
- Jack Burton, from the film Big Trouble in Little China
- Jack Crawford, in the Hannibal Lecter book series and several adaptations
- Jack Dawson, played by Leonardo DiCaprio in the 1997 film Titanic
- Jack Napier, of the main characters in the 1989 film Batman
- Jack Reacher, protagonist in a series of novels by Lee Child
- Jack Ryan, in Tom Clancy books and film adaptations
- Jack Skellington, from the film The Nightmare Before Christmas
- Jack Sparrow, protagonist of the Pirates of the Caribbean films
- Jack Torrance, from the 1977 novel The Shining and its film adaptation from 1980
- Jack West Jr, protagonist in a series of novels written by Matthew Reilly

=== Television ===
- Jack Abbott, in the CBS soap opera The Young and the Restless
- Jack Bauer, main character in the American TV series 24
- Jack Branning, in the British soap opera EastEnders
- Jack Carter (Eureka), in the American TV series Eureka
- Jack Donaghy, in the American TV series 30 Rock
- Jack Duckworth, in the British soap opera Coronation Street
- Jack Fenton, in the American animated TV series Danny Phantom
- Jack Geller, recurring character in the American TV show Friends
- Father Jack Hackett, in the British TV series Father Ted
- Jack Harkness, main character in the British TV series Torchwood and a recurring character in Doctor Who
- Jack Hodgins, in the American TV series Bones
- Jack Kelly, in the musical Newsies
- Jack Landors, in the American TV series Power Rangers SPD
- Jack McFarland, in the American sitcom Will & Grace
- Jack Michaelson, fictional character in the British soap opera, Brookside, played by actor Paul Duckworth
- Jack O'Neill, main character in the Canadian-American TV series Stargate SG-1
- Jack Osborne, in the British soap opera Hollyoaks
- Jack Samuels, a corrupt detective in American TV series American Horror Story: Cult
- Jack Shephard, main character in the American TV series Lost
- Jack Spicer, villain in the American animated series Xiaolin Showdown
- Jack Sugden, in the British soap opera Emmerdale
- Jack Tripper, protagonist of the American sitcoms Three's Company and Three's a Crowd
- Jack Pearson, main character in the American TV series This Is Us
- Jack the Front Loader, in the British TV series Thomas & Friends
- Jack Russell, a friend of Rusty with ADHD in Bluey
- Samurai Jack (real name unknown), the official nickname of the otherwise unnamed protagonist of the Samurai Jack animated series

=== Video games ===
- Jack (Tekken), multiple characters from the Tekken series
- Jack (Mass Effect), in the Mass Effect series
- Handsome Jack, the main antagonist from Borderlands 2
- Jack (BioShock), a.k.a. Jack Ryan, the silent protagonist of BioShock
- Raiden (Metal Gear), the main character of Metal Gear Solid II and Metal Gear Rising is also named Jack
- Jack Marston, a character from Red Dead Redemption and Red Dead Redemption 2
- Jack Krauser, a character and antagonist from the video game series Resident Evil

=== Mascots ===
- Jack Box, mascot of the American restaurant chain Jack in the Box
- Jack the Bulldog, Georgetown University mascot

=== Other ===
- Jack Flag, superhero appearing in American comic books

== See also ==
- Jack (disambiguation)
- Jack (surname)
- Jacques
- Jock (given name)
- Old Jack (disambiguation), a list of people with the nickname and a few other items
