= Jock (given name) =

Origin
- Origin: Scotland

Other names
- Related names: Jack, Jacques, James, Jacob, John

Jock is a Scottish diminutive form of the forename "John"; It is also a nickname for someone of Scottish origin, as well as being the collective name for Scottish soldiers, collectively known as "the Jocks". It corresponds to Jack in England and Wales. In London the rhyming slang "sweaty" is used, deriving from "Sweaty sock - Jock".

The name may refer to:

== Art and entertainment ==
- Jock Bartley, American rock guitarist
- Jock Gaynor (1929–1998), American actor, producer, and writer
- Jock Macdonald (1897–1960), Scottish-born Canadian painter
- Jock McFadyen (born 1950), British painter
- Jock Mahoney (1919–1989), American actor and stuntman
- Jock Purdon (1925–1998), British poet and songwriter
- Jock Reynolds (born 1947), American museum administrator and visual artist
- Jock Soto (born c. 1965), American former ballet dancer and current instructor
- Jock Sturges (born 1947), American photographer

== Crime, punishment and policing ==
- Jock Delves Broughton (1883–1942), British aristocrat acquitted of murder
- Robert Leslie Stewart (1918–1989), Scottish hangman
- Jock Wilson (police officer) (1922–1993), British police officer
- Joseph Yablonski (1910–1969), American murdered labor leader
- Jock Young (1942–2013), British sociologist and criminologist

== Military ==
- Jock Campbell (British Army officer) (1894–1942), British Army officer and recipient of the Victoria Cross
- Jock Cunningham (1902–1969), British lieutenant colonel in the Spanish Civil War
- Jock Haswell, (1919–2018) British military and intelligence author and former British intelligence officer
- Jock Lewes (1913–1941), British Army lieutenant, inventor of the Lewes bomb and founding principal training officer of the Special Air Service
- Jock Slater (born 1938), retired Royal Navy admiral, First Sea Lord and Chief of the Naval Staff
- Jock Stirrup (born 1949), retired Royal Air Force marshal
- Jock Wilson (British Army soldier) (1903–2008), British serviceman and oldest D-Day veteran

== Politics and diplomacy ==
- Jock Bruce-Gardyne (1930–1990), British politician
- Jock Colville (1915–1987), British civil servant
- Jock Ferguson (politician) (1946–2010), Scottish-born Australian politician
- Jock Haston (1913–1986), British Trotskyist politician
- Jock Granter (1921–2012), Australian politician
- John R. McKernan Jr. (born 1948), American politician, twice governor of Maine
- Jock Mathison (1901–1982), New Zealand politician and cabinet minister
- Jock Nelson (1908–1991), Australian politician
- Jock Taylor (diplomat) (1924–2002), British diplomat and ambassador to several countries
- Jock Tiffin (1896–1955), British union and Labour Party official
- Jock Alves (c. 1909–1979), Rhodesian physician and politician

== Sports ==
- Jock Aird (1926–2021), Scottish retired footballer
- Jock Allan (born c. 1891), Scottish footballer
- Jock Archibald (1895–1967), Scottish footballer
- Jock Blackwood (1899–c. 1979), Australian rugby union player
- Jacques "Jock" Boyer (born 1955), American former cyclist, first American to compete in the Tour de France
- Jock Butterfield (1932–2004), New Zealand rugby league footballer
- Jock Callander (born 1961), Canadian ice hockey player
- Jock Cameron (1905–1935), South African cricketer
- Jock Cameron (footballer), Scottish football player and managers in the 1900s and 1910s
- Jock Campbell (footballer) (1922–1983), Scottish footballer
- Jock Carter (1910–1992), English footballer
- Jock Climie, Canadian sportscaster and retired Canadian Football League player
- Jock Collier (1897–1940), Scottish footballer and manager
- Jock Cordner (1910–1996), Australian rules footballer
- Jock Cumberford, footballer who played in Australia's first three full international matches in 1922
- Jock Davie (1913–1994), Scottish footballer
- Jock Dodds (1915–2007), Scottish footballer
- Jock Doherty (1894–1957), Australian rules footballer
- Jock Drummond (1870–1935), Scottish footballer
- Jock Edward, Scottish footballer in the 1920s
- Jock Edwards (1955–2020), New Zealand former cricketer
- Jock Espie (1868-?), Scottish footballer
- Jock Ewart (1891–1943), Scottish football goalkeeper
- Jock Ferguson (soccer) (1887–1973), Scottish-born American soccer player
- Jock Govan (1923–1999), Scottish footballer
- Jock Grieve (1887–1955), Scottish footballer
- Jock Hamilton (1869–1931), Scottish footballer
- Jock Hanvey (1882–1935), American college football player and coach
- Jock Henderson (footballer, born 1871) (1871–1930), Scottish footballer
- Jock Henderson (footballer, born 1895) (1895–1957), Scottish footballer
- John Henebry (1918–2007), United States Air Force major general
- Jock Hobbs (1960–2012), New Zealand rugby union player and All Blacks captain
- Jock Hutcheson, Scottish professional footballer in the 1870s and '80s
- Jock Hutchison (1884–1977), Scottish-American golfer
- Jock Hutton (1898–1970), Scottish footballer
- Jock Kirton (1916–1996), Scottish footballer
- Jock Landale (born 1995), Australian basketball player
- Jock Leckie (1906–1977), Scottish football goalkeeper
- Jock Lineen (1928–2022), former Australian rules footballer
- Jock Livingston (1920–1998), Australian cricketer
- Jock McAvoy, ring name of British boxer Joseph Patrick Bamford (1908–1971)
- Jock McCorkell (1918–1987), Australian rules footballer
- Jock McDougall (1901–1973), Scottish footballer
- Jock McHale (1882–1953), Australian rules football player and coach
- Jock McKenzie (Australian footballer) (1911–1989), Australian rules footballer
- Jock McKenzie (rugby union, born 1892) (1892–1968), New Zealand rugby union footballer
- Jock McNab (1894–1949), Scottish footballer
- Jock Menefee (1868–1953), American Major League Baseball pitcher
- Jock Mulraney (1916–2001), Scottish footballer
- Jock Newall (1917–2004), New Zealand footballer
- Jock O'Brien (footballer, born 1909) (1909–1985), Australian rules footballer
- Jock O'Brien (footballer, born 1937) (1937–2022), Australian rules footballer
- Jock Paterson (1926–2000), English footballer
- Jock Porter (1894–1952), Scottish motorcycle racer
- Jock Robertson (1898–1970), English footballer
- Jock Robson (1899–1995), Scottish football goalkeeper
- Jock Rutherford (1884–1963), English footballer
- Jock Sanders (born 1988), American football player in the Canadian Football League
- Jock Scott (footballer) (1906–1981), Scottish footballer
- Jock Semple (1903–1988), Boston Marathon official
- Jock Shaw (1912–2000), Scottish footballer
- Jock Shearer (1917–1979), Scottish football player and coach
- Jock Simpson (1886–1959), English footballer
- Jock Somerlott (1882–1965), American Major League Baseball player
- Jock Spencer (1928–2003), Australian rules footballer
- Jock Stein (1922–1985), Scottish football player and manager
- William Stewart (cyclist) (1883–1950), British Olympic cyclist
- Jock Sturrock (1915–1997), Australian yachtsman
- Jock Sutherland (1889–1948), American college football player and Hall-of-Fame coach and National Football League coach
- Jock Sutherland (basketball) (1928–2023), American basketball coach
- Jock Taylor (1954–1982), Scottish motorcycle sidecar racer
- Jock Taylor (footballer, born 1886) (1886–1916), Scottish footballer
- Jock Taylor (footballer, born 1909) (1909–1964), Scottish footballer
- Jock Thomson (1906–1979), Scottish football player and manager
- Jock Turner (1943–1992), Scottish former rugby union player
- Jock Wadley (1914–1981), English sports journalist
- Jock Wallace, Jr. (1935–1996), Scottish football player and manager, son of Jock Wallace, Sr.
- Jock Wallace, Sr. (1911–1978), Scottish football goalkeeper
- Jock Walker (1882–1968), Scottish footballer (Swindon Town, Middlesbrough, Reading, Scotland)
- Jock Waters, Scottish rugby union player in the 1930s
- Jock West (1909–2004), British motorcycle racer
- Jock White (1897–1986), Scottish footballer
- Jock Whyte (1921–1998), Scottish footballer
- Jock Wightman (1912–1964), Scottish footballer
- Jock Wilson (Scottish footballer) (1870–after 1900)
- Jock Young (canoeist), British slalom canoeist, 1981 world champion in the C-2 team event

== Other ==
- Jock R. Anderson (born 1941), Australian agricultural economist
- Jock Barnes (1907–2000), New Zealand trade unionist and syndicalist
- Jock Brown (born 1946), Scottish solicitor and freelance football commentator
- Jock Campbell, Baron Campbell of Eskan (1912–1994), British businessman
- Jock Carroll (1919–1995), Canadian writer, journalist and photographer
- Jock Kinneir (1917–1994), British typographer and graphic designer who, with Margaret Calvert, designed many of the road signs used throughout the United Kingdom
- Jock D. Mackinlay (born 1952), American information visualization expert
- Jock McKeen (born 1946), Canadian physician, acupuncturist, author and lecturer
- Jock Marshall (1911–1967), Australian writer, academic and ornithologist
- Jock Phillips (born 1947), New Zealand historian, author and encyclopedist
- John Hay Whitney (1904–1982), American businessman, philanthropist and ambassador
- Jock Zonfrillo (1976–2023), Scottish-Australian chef and television presenter

== See also ==
- Joc Pederson (born 1992), American Major League Baseball player
