= John Kirby =

John Kirby may refer to:

== Arts and entertainment ==
- Joshua Kirby (1716–1774), often mistakenly called John Joshua Kirby, British landscape painter, engraver, and writer
- John Kirby (actor) (1950/1951–2026), American actor and acting coach
- John Kirby (artist) (1949–2025), British painter
- John Kirby (musician) (1908–1952), American jazz musician
- John Carroll Kirby (born 1983), American pianist, record producer and composer

== Politics ==
- John Kirby (Canadian politician) (1772–1846), Canadian businessman & politician
- John Kirby (admiral) (born 1963), retired United States Navy admiral, and spokesperson
- John Kirby (MP), member of parliament for Hertfordshire

== Sports ==
- John Kirby (baseball) (1865–1931), baseball player
- John Kirby (English footballer) (1909–1969), English football player
- John Kirby (American football) (1942–2017), American football player
- John Kirby (cricketer) (born 1936), English cricketer
- Jon Luke Kirby (born 1998), rugby league footballer

== Other people ==
- John Kirby (topographer) (1690–1753), English mapmaker and illustrator
- John Kirby (surgeon) (1781–1853), president of the Royal College of Surgeons in Ireland
- John Henry Kirby (1860–1940), American businessman
- John Kirby (bishop) (born 1938), Irish bishop
- John Kirby (attorney) (1939–2019), American lawyer and namesake of Nintendo character Kirby

== See also ==
- John Kirby Allen (1810–1838), American pioneer
- Jack Kirby (disambiguation)
- John Kirkby (disambiguation)
