= John Yang =

John Yang is the name of:

- John Yang (photographer) (1933-2009), architect and photographer
- John Yang (journalist) (born 1958), journalist and television news correspondent
- John Baptist Yang Xiaoting (born 1964), Chinese Roman Catholic bishop
- Jack Yang, Harvard scientist

== See also ==
- Yang (surname)
- Andrew Yang, mistakenly referred to as "John Yang" by MSNBC during his presidential campaign
