= Senator Wood =

Senator Wood may refer to:

- Amos E. Wood (1810–1850), Ohio State Senate
- Asa Wood (1865–1945), Nebraska State Senate
- Benjamin Wood (American politician) (1820–1900), New York State Senate
- C. B. Wood (1867–1915), Arizona State Senate
- Daniel P. Wood (1819–1891), New York State Senate
- Fay Wood (politician) (1889–1959), Nebraska State Senate
- Frank Wood (Iowa politician) (born 1951), Iowa State Senate
- George Tyler Wood (1795–1858), Texas State Senate
- H. R. Wood (died 1952), Arizona State Senate
- Jack Arthur Wood Jr. (1923–2005), Idaho State Senate
- James Wood (New York politician) (1820–1892), New York State Senate
- Jeannette Wood (1932–2021), Washington State Senate
- John Wood (Illinois politician) (1798–1880), Illinois State Senate
- Lloyd H. Wood (1896–1964), Pennsylvania State Senate
- Reuben Wood (1793–1864), Ohio State Senate
- Samuel Newitt Wood (1825–1891), Kansas State Senate
- Stephen Mosher Wood (1832–1920), Ohio State Senate
- T. A. Wood (1852–1936), Mississippi State Senate
- T. Newell Wood (1909–1982), Pennsylvania State Senate
- Thomas Jefferson Wood (1844–1908), Indiana State Senate
- William R. Wood (Indiana politician) (1861–1933), Indiana State Senate
