= Asselstine =

Asselstine is a surname. Notable people with the surname include:

- Brian Asselstine (born in 1953), American baseball player
- Jack Asselstine (1895–1966), Canadian ice hockey player
- Ron Asselstine (born 1946), Canadian ice hockey player
- William James Asselstine (1891–1973), Canadian politician

== See also ==
- Asselstine, Ontario, communities of Loyalist, Ontario
