= Leyfield =

Leyfield is a surname. Notable people with the surname include:

- Charlie Leyfield (1911–1982), English footballer
- Jack Leyfield (1923–2014), English footballer

== See also ==
- Layfield, a surname
- Leafield
- Leyfields, a housing estate in Tamworth, Staffordshire, England
