= Jack Morrell =

Jack Morrell may refer to:

- Jack Morrell (boxer) (born 1955), American boxer
- Jack Morrell (historian of science), University of Leeds, England
