= Mulcair =

Mulcair is an Irish language name.

== Geography ==
- River Mulcair aka River Mulkear, in Ireland

== People ==
- Barry Mulcair (born 1948), Australian-rules footballer
- Jack Mulcair (1889–1953), Canadian íce hockey player
- Tom Mulcair (born 1954), Canadian politician

== See also ==
- Mulcare, a surname
