= Jack Wilkie-Jans =

Aboriginal filmmaker and advocate

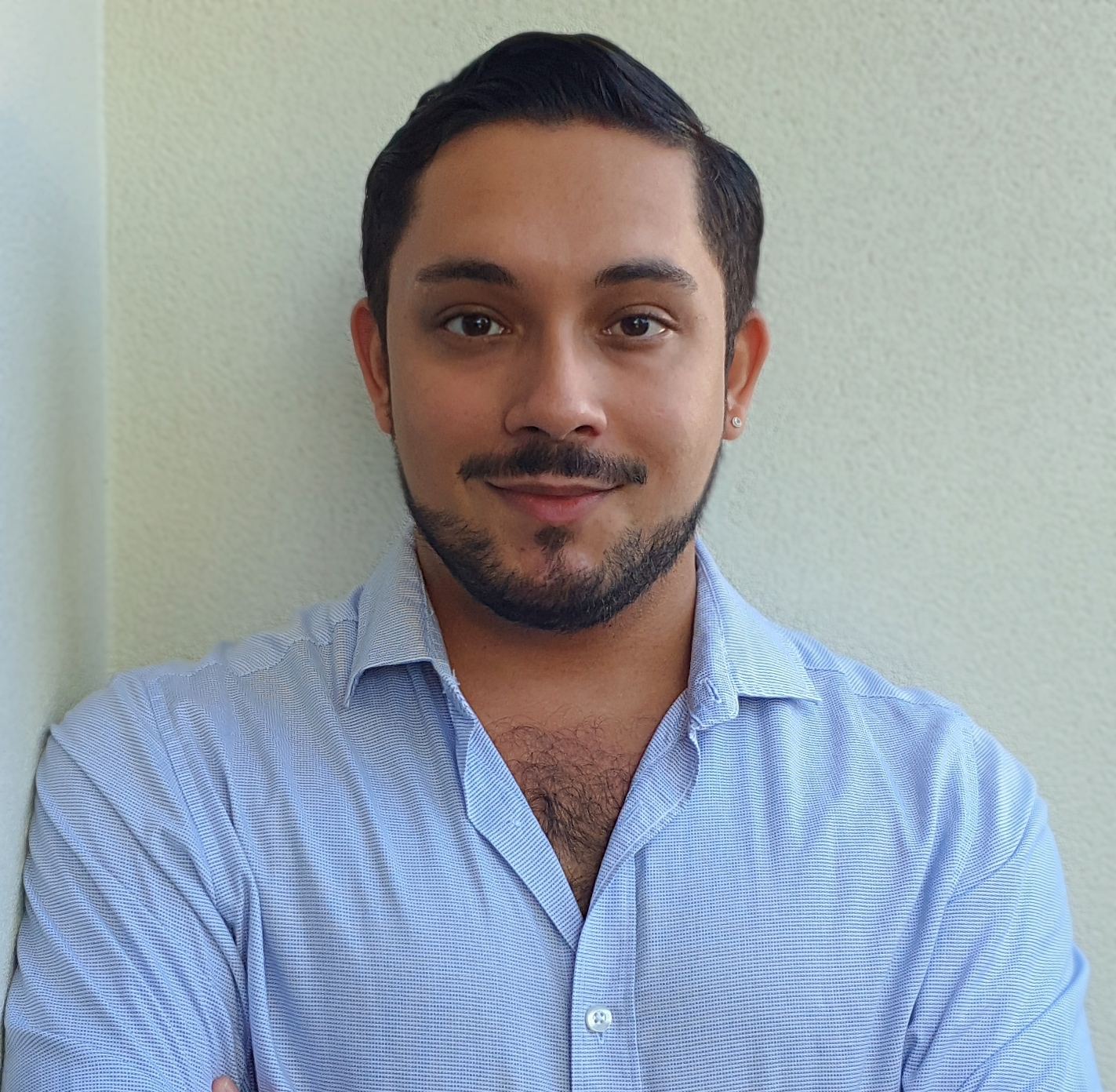
- Born: Jack Andrew Jans; August 8, 1992 (age 34); Cairns, Queensland, Australia
- Other name: Jack Jans
- Citizenship: Australian and British
- Education: James Cook University
- Occupations: Artist, journalist, political affairs commentator
- Awards: Alumni National Gallery of Australia's Wesfarmer's Indigenous Arts Leadership Program, Associate Fellow of the Royal Commonwealth Society
- Website: www.jackwilkiejans.com

Jack Andrew Jans or Jack Wilkie-Jans is an Australian Aboriginal affairs advocate, artist (painter and filmmaker), writer, and politologist.

Born in Cairns/Gimuy in tropical Far North Queensland, Jack is a Waanyi, Teppathiggi and Tjungundji man and is of mixed heritage (British, Vanuatuan, Danish).

== Aboriginal Affairs ==
In recent years Jack's work as an Aboriginal affairs advocate has increased as both a political commentator and journalist. Known for his commentary of Cape York Peninsula issues, economic development in remote regions and contemporary Indigenous affairs, he is known at times for his controversy in critiquing long-standing Government programmes and their approach to Indigenous peoples. He is perhaps most known for lobbying against ineffective Native Title representation "punitive measures" such as the Alcohol Management Plans & Welfare Reform Trials in Cape York Peninsula (a region known for high unemployment), arguing that focus ought to be placed on addressing solutions to the issues of economic ostracisation and welfare dependency.

In 2014 Jack became a board member to be elected to Cape York Sustainable Futures Inc. which was Cape York's peak organisation for economic & community development (formerly known as Cape York Peninsula Development Association); and as Deputy Chair of then-Local Tourism Organisation: Tourism Cape York. In 2018 Jack stood down as Deputy Chair of the organisation and resigned from the board.

== Art and culture ==
In 2023 Jack launched his private consultancy practice, JWJ Consultancy covering a scope of strategy and policy planning within the Indigenous art sector of the Australian arts industry; including artist representation.

Jack has written for multiple major arts publications, maintaining a regular column (since 2023) with Koori Mail, as a freelance contributor to ArtsHub, and occasional contributor to Art Collector.

His short film I'm Still Here won the Best Experimental Film of the Understory Film Festival awards in 2020.

== Other interests ==
Linking to his early background in Cape York Peninsula, Jack is also passionate about the development of First Nations-led native food business development and manufacturing. In 2022, he became an founding director of the Food Beverage Institute.

== Family ==
Notable relatives of Jack include Aboriginal leader, Jean Aileen Little (his maternal grandmother), as well as renowned Australian sculptor & ceramicist, the late Dr. Thancoupie Fletcher James AO (who was his tribal grandmother). Also, he is a [maternal] great grand nephew of land rights activist, Denny Bowenda.

== Awards ==
In 2013 Jack was a nominee for the Cairns Region Australia Day Awards for the Cultural Award, both for his work with supporting local charities and the arts. In 2015 he was named an Associate Fellow of the Royal Commonwealth Society. In 2017 he was named as one of the Queen's Baton Bearers for the 2018 Commonwealth Games.

== Qualifications ==
Jack holds a bachelor's degree of arts, majoring in Politics & International Affairs from James Cook University. He is also an alumnus of the National Gallery of Australia's Indigenous Arts Leadership Program.
