= Judge Nevin =

Judge Nevin may refer to:

- Jack Nevin (fl. 1990s–2020s), Washington superior court judge and judge of the United States Army Court of Criminal Appeals
- Robert Reasoner Nevin (1875–1952), judge of the United States District Court for the Southern District of Ohio
