= Jean Aileen Little =

Aboriginal leader

Jean Aileen Little OAM
- Gaarkamunda
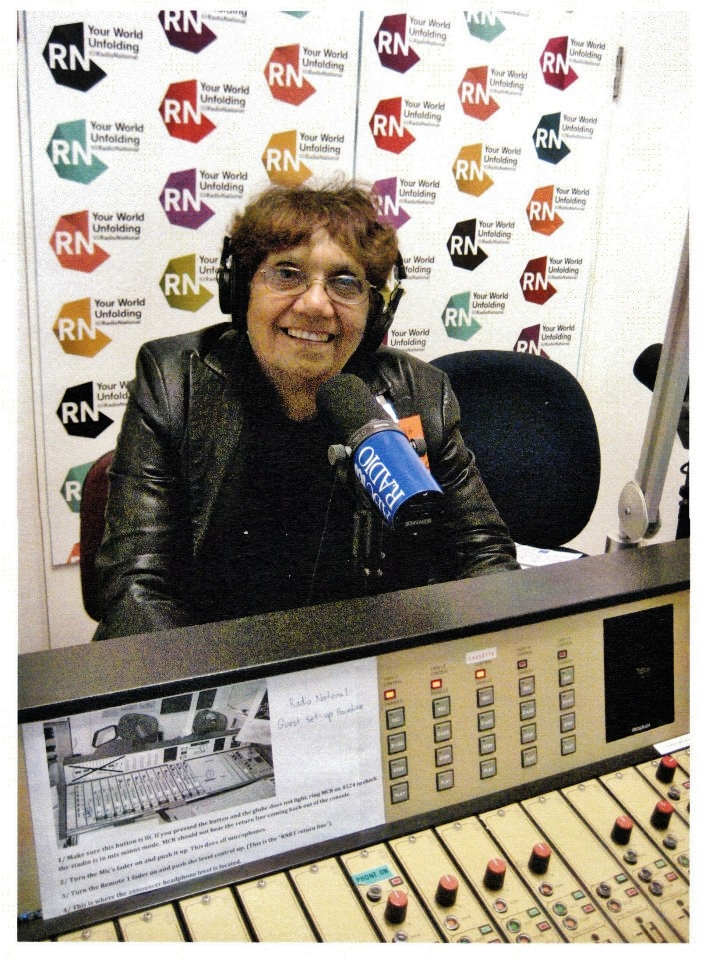
- Little in 2012
- Born: 1941 (age 84–85)
- Other names: Jean Jans, Jean Ling
- Education: St. Andrew's War Memorial Hospital
- Occupations: Nurse, Public Servant, Aboriginal Affairs Activist
- Awards: Medal of the Order of Australia

Jean Aileen Little OAM, née Ling (also known as Jean Jans from her first marriage, born 1941) is an Australian Aboriginal leader and community advocate from Mapoon in the Far North Queensland. In 1997 the then Governor of Queensland, Leneen Forde, awarded Little the Medal of the Order of Australia for her services to Aboriginal health and community services.

== Background ==
Little was born in 1941 at the Presbyterian Mission in the small Aboriginal community of Mapoon in the Western Cape of Cape York Peninsula. Mapoon was a former Mission town but prior to the 'Burning of Mapoon' Little with her family moved to the Torres Strait island of Thursday Island. From there she left to Melbourne, Victoria after having successfully completed her nursing training at St. Andrew's War Memorial Hospital in Brisbane (for which, in 1966, she won a study scholarship from then Queensland Peanut Marketing Board and Trans Australian Airlines).

== Career ==
Little is known for her extensive community work in the health, as a consultant on Cultural Awareness across the corporate sector, advocacy against deaths in custody and involvement within politics in relation to Indigenous Affairs. Little has also worked in a number of public service positions including the Canberra Institute for Criminology, Department of Community Services and the Department of Health & Ageing. She is also a former Executive Officer of Mapoon Shire Council.

Little is a Life Member of the now closed Alcohol and Other Drugs Council of Australia (ADCA) Australia's peak body in alcohol and substance abuse and misuse research, and in 2012 she was elected by her peers to be the first Aboriginal woman to sit on the Board of Directors. In 2005 she was an ambassador to the 25th International Montessori Congress in Sydney.

== Community advocacy ==
Little currently sits on a number of community led committees who advocate against the use of excessive force from Police Officers on prison or watch-house inmates. She also sits on the Thancoupie Bursary Fund committee, a bursary in honour of late Queenslander and celebrated Australian ceramicist Dr Thancoupie Gloria Fletcher James AO. Little is a former Chair of the Cape York District Health Council, now known as the Cape York Hospital and Health Service Board. She was also one of the original signatories of the Western Cape Communities Co-existence Agreement (also known as the Western Cape Communities Trust), and was also one of the original signatories from the Tjungundji tribe of Mapoon for the DOGIT or Deed of Grant in Trust agreement, which enabled local Aboriginal people in communities to manage traditional land and receive royalties/reparations for mining activities.

== Awards and honours ==
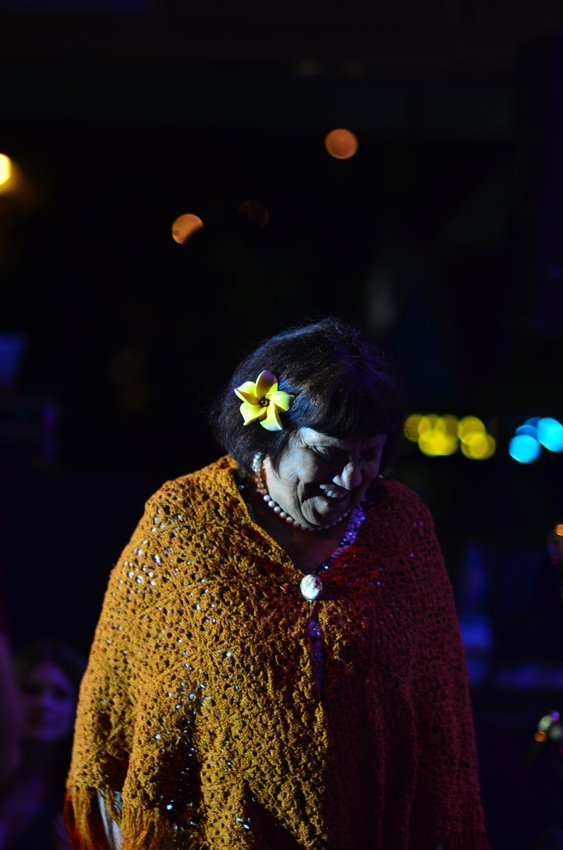
Little performing as a Queensland State Finalist at the State Finals for the National Poetry Slam in 2011 at the State Library of Queensland

In 1995, Little received a local "Citizen of the Year" award. Little is a Life Member of the Alcohol and other Drugs Council of Australia. In 1997 she was awarded the Medal of the Order of Australia for her work in Aboriginal health and the community.

In 2011 Little, also a writer and poet, was selected as one of Queensland's State Finalists for the National Poetry Slam. She performed at the State Finals at the State Library of Queensland.

In 2013 Little was awarded the Queensland's Speaker's Inspiring Women Award for the electorate Queensland state electorate of Barron River.

In 2014 Ms Little was announced as one of the state finalists for the 2015 Queensland Australian of the Year Awards in the Senior Australian of the Year division.
