= Jack Kirby (disambiguation) =

Jack Kirby (1917–1994) was an American comic book writer.

Jack Kirby may also refer to:

- Jack Kirby (Australian footballer) (1889–1939), Australian rules footballer
- Jack Kirby (English footballer) (1910–1960), English football goalkeeper
- Jack Kirby (American football) (1923–2007), American football player
- Jack T. Kirby (1938–2009), American historian who wrote about the Southern United States

== See also ==
- John Kirby (disambiguation)
- Jack Kilby (1923–2005), electrical engineer
