= John Kirkby =

John Kirkby may refer to:

- John Kirkby (bishop of Ely) (died 1290)
- John Kirkby (bishop of Carlisle) (died 1352)
- John Kirkby (soccer) (1929–1953) American soccer player
- John Kirkby (MP) for Hampshire (UK Parliament constituency)

== See also ==
- John Kirby (disambiguation)
- John de Kirkby (died 1423), English scholar, cleric and Crown official
