= Jack Moore =

Jack Moore may refer to:

- Jack Moore (sportsman) (1911–?), English amateur footballer, referee and tennis player
- Jack D. Moore (1906–1998), American set decorator
- Jack Moore (basketball) (1959–1984), American college basketball player
- Jack B. Moore, American chief executive
- Jack Moore (preacher) (1905–1975), American deliverance preacher
- Jack Moore, cartoonist, creator of Kelly & Duke
- Clayton Moore (Jack Carlton Moore, 1914–1999), American actor best known for playing the Lone Ranger
- Jack Moore (actor), portrayed the son of Connor Hawke

== See also ==
- John Moore (disambiguation)
