= Royal Belfast Golf Club =

Golf club in Craigavad, Belfast

Coordinates: 54.66161°N 5.78411°W

The Royal Belfast Golf Club is located on the southern shores of Belfast Lough at Craigavad in County Down, seven miles from the centre of Belfast. Founded in 1881 the club claims to be the oldest such club in Ireland. The present course was designed by Harry Colt.

== Origins ==
The course was founded at lands at Kinnegar, Holywood in 1881 and granted a Royal Charter by the Prince of Wales, later Edward VII, in 1885. In 1892 the club moved to Carnalea and then again to its present location at Craigavad in 1925.

== See also ==
- List of golf clubs granted Royal status
