= Layfield =

Layfield is a surname. Notable people with the surname include:

- John "Bradshaw" Layfield, American businessman, wrestler, and television personality
- John Layfield (theologian) (died 1617), English scholar and bible translator
- Jonelle Layfield
- Kirstine Layfield

== See also ==
- Leyfield, a surname
