= Mulcare =

Mulcare is a surname. Notable people with the surname include:

- Frank Mulcare, New Zealand rugby league player
- Nyota Mulcare, Montserrat politician

== See also ==
- Mulcair (disambiguation)
