= Craigavad =

Townland in County Down, Northern Ireland

Coordinates: 54.6655°N 5.76792°W

Craigavad (from Irish Craig an Bháda, meaning 'rock of the boat') is a townland in County Down, Northern Ireland, lying within the civil parish of Holywood and the historic barony of Castlereagh Lower. Suburban and residential in character, Craigavad lies between the centre of Holywood and Bangor in the area administered by the Ards and North Down Borough Council.

== Places of note ==
- Royal Belfast Golf Club, possibly the oldest such club in Ireland is located at Station Road, Craigavad
- Rockport School founded in 1906 is located in Craigavad.
- There is a Camphill community at Seahill Road, Craigavad.

== People ==
- Geoffrey Henry Cecil Bing (1909–1977) a barrister and politician was born at Craigavad.
- Sir John Campbell (1862–1929) a consultant surgeon and politician died at his house at Craigavad.
- Robert Cunningham (minister) (died 1637) first Presbyterian minister
- John Aiken Wilson (1937–1997) a Northern Irish born novelist, amateur boxer and notable literary figure was born at Ballyrobert, Craigavad.

== Transport ==
The A2 road passes through Craigavad where it is joined by the B20 road. Although the Belfast-Bangor railway line also passes through the area, Craigavad station is no longer in use. The closest stations are at Cultra and Seahill.
