= Jack Loach =

British businessman (born 1942)

- Born: August 21, 1942 (age 83); United Kingdom
- Occupation: Businessman
- Known for: Being director of companies involved in several prominent legal cases

Jack Loach (born 21 August 1942) is a prominent British businessman.

His company was accused of failing in its duty of care in regard to the death of a 17-year-old boy. Loach was one of the directors (together with members of his family) of S&J Loach Ltd engineering contractors who were originally the subject of a Coroner’s verdict of unlawfully killing.

== Outcome ==
The 17-year-old boy driver lost control of his car on a newly laid road surface, crashed and was killed. A public outrage (mainly his family and friends.) was caused when the Coroner was ordered by the Crown Office to change his verdict to one of accidental death. The Crown Office/Coroner apologized to S&J Loach Ltd for the gross negligence in reaching the original verdict. The Coroner in question was removed from the high-profile major city coroner’s post to a more rural location.

== Career ==
He became director and a Construction Engineer at Reflecting Building Materials Limited in March 1995 and held this position until January 2000. He subsequently was director and secretary of S&J Loach Limited from pre June 1991 until August 2005.

After that he moved and held the position of director, Secretary and a Construction Engineer at Exactbond Limited from May 1992 until March 2000. Jack Loach became Managing Director of Glostone Limited in October 1998.

== Legal cases ==
- Jack Loach has been involved in various litigation in the United Kingdom. In September 2001, he sought permission to appeal a May 2001 judgment which dismissed his appeal against an order of April 2001.

This case was a second-tier appeal. The judges disagreed with the submission put forward by Mr. Loach.

According to the court ruling, the representation relied on the particulars of claim which was the sum of £1,370,000 would or could be transferred from one of the accounts of Peter Hirst held in the Pictet & Cie Bank, Switzerland into Jack Loach’s account. An account was set up for Mr. Loach by Pictet & Cie and documented agreements were drawn up by Pictet Asset Management for their client Peter Hirst to facilitate this transaction on 15 February 1997. A similar account had been set up personally by Ivan Pictet for a Mr. Peter Humphries in their London offices to transfer monies from Peter Hirst’s accounts in Geneva. Mr. Humphries gave this evidence to the courts. Those transactions were illegal transactions if carried out. Peter Hirst was an undischarged criminal bankrupt. Pictet & Cie were aware of their client's "criminal bankruptcy" back in 1993. They were visited in London by the Fraud Squad seeking the whereabouts of monies that Peter Hirst had fraudulently obtained and hidden. Therefore, any transfer of money from any account in Peter Hirst’s name was illegal, and in any case, that money had already vested in the trustee in bankruptcy. Mr. Loach and Mr. Humphries are registered as creditors with Peter Hirst’s trustee in bankruptcy. The trustee acknowledges that Mr. Loach & Mr. Humphries account for almost 92% of the creditor debt.

- Hansard. British Parliament. 27 March 2007. Mr. Barry Sheerman M.P. (Loach & Humphries) -- constituents of mine have lost £2 million through fraud. The fraudster used Pictet & Cie – a French bank – and Pictet Asset Management to back the fraud being perpetrated.
- On 21 February 1997 (some six days after the monies from Pictet & Cie failed to materialise) the firm of S & J Loach had to raise monies which resulted in them making an agreement with Michael Gerson (Leasing) Limited.
- In early 2001 Jack Loach was named as a defendant in a request for an appeal in regard to a leasing agreement dispute with Michael Gerson (Leasing) Limited. Mr Loach had entered into a written guarantee with Gerson, whereby he undertook to pay Gerson any such sums owed that were unpaid by the family company.

Gerson made formal demands to S&J Loach for payment on 18 October 2000, and filed a claim against Mr Loach on 27 October 2000. The particulars of the claim alleged that at the result of the termination of the leasing agreement a total of £160,667.52 had become due to Gerson. The trial took place in December 2001. The judge gave judgment against Jack Loach in the sum claimed (including interest to date) of £203,212.27. He further provided that interest should accrue on the judgment sum until payment at the rate of 2% per month. He refused the defendant's permission to appeal.

- S.& J.Loach lodged an appeal at the Court of Appeal and the judgment sum was reduced to £95,885.50.
