= Jack Bartley =

English footballer

Personal information
- Full name: John Bartley
- Date of birth: 15 January 1909
- Place of birth: Houghton-le-Spring, England
- Date of death: 10 October 1929 (aged 20)
- Place of death: Houghton-le-Spring, England
- Position: Wing half

Youth career
- Hetton Juniors

Senior career*
Years	Team	Apps	(Gls)
1925–1926	Chester-le-Street		
1926–1929	Sunderland	19	(1)
- * Club domestic league appearances and goals

John Bartley (15 January 1909 – 10 October 1929) was an English professional footballer who played as a wing half for Sunderland.
