= Jack Francis Needham =

Jack Francis Needham OBE (1842–1924) was a British officer in the Bengal Police who was posted in the Eastern Himalayan region during the late 19th and early 20th centuries. He authored several pioneering descriptions of Sino-Tibetan and Tai-Kadai languages in the area.

== Biography ==
Jack Francis Needham (often referenced as J. F. Needham) was an Officer in the Bengal Police in the mid-to-late 19th century, later appointed Political Officer at the British outpost of Sadiya in Assam in 1882. Needham conducted a tour of the "Abor" (Adi) area in the Siang River Valley (modern-day East Siang District in Arunachal Pradesh state) in 1884, which established British relations with a small segment of the Tani hill tribes. His conduct in this region was strongly criticised after he led a punitive force up the Yamne River to punish villages around Damroh, which destroyed villages, livestock, household property and crops. Needham later determined that the wrong villages had been punished. Six years later, he led another expedition in the region but it was also criticised by Viceroy Curzon for its poor planning, avoidable loss of life and disproportionate expenditure. During this time Needham also produced outline grammars of local tribal languages. His expeditions helped extend British political control beyond the existing borders and gathered geographical information later used in drawing the McMahon Line.

== Research and publications ==
During his tenure in Sadiya Needham completed the first ever descriptions of several regional languages, including the Eastern Tani language Mising, the Sal language Singpho and Tai Khamti, as well as an ethnographic travelogue of his journey from Sadiya to South-Eastern Tibet.
