= Jack Pyle =

American stage magician

- Born: 1909
- Died: July 17, 1987 (aged 77–78); Tampa, Florida

Jack Pyle (1909-1987) was an American stage magician.

== Biography ==
=== Early life ===
He was the third youngest of eight brothers and sisters, all of whom became scholars and professional people including a brigadier general. He was influenced by a long-lost half-brother, a patent medicine salesman known as “Chief Lighthawk” and did his first magic trick at age nine. An undated press clipping reports him performing at a Kiwanis club in Rockport, probably in 1940.

A later press clipping reports him in the Navy’s 52nd Defense Battalion in the Marshall Islands in World War II, performing for front line troops under “impossible conditions.” He devised a way to produce a large pig (named Tojo) from thin air, which the natives eventually stole and ate. The pig trick evolved into his trademark “giant rabbit production.”

While recovering from illness in Honolulu he met the Japanese magician, Ishida Tenkai, who was reportedly under house arrest and not allowed to leave the island. He and Tenkai both had short fingers and it was from Tenkai that Pyle learned how to do sleight of hand with this handicap.

=== First performance ===
His first performance after the war was in the Empire Room of the Schroeder Hotel in Milwaukee. He headlined at Milwaukee’s Celebrity Club, 26 Club, the Blatz Palm Garden, Abe’s Colony Club in Dallas He toured for International Harvester Inc. throughout the Midwest and Texas, pulling a house trailer with his wife Barbara and son John (later to become hypnotist John-Ivan Palmer), appearing in hundreds of small town theaters and auditoriums. He did TV commercials for Hudson automobiles and was a model for the riverboat gambler on Stancraft playing cards.

In 1949 he was briefly associated with Harry Blackstone in Kansas City and thereafter appeared at such prestige venues as the Copacabana, the Waldorf Astoria, the Palmer House and the Playboy Clubs. He traveled on USO tours from the North Pole to the Arctic and appeared at one time or another with virtually all the stars of his day including Sophie Tucker, Hank Williams, George Gobel, Dub Taylor, Jan Murray, Conway Twitty, George Kirby and Bobby Vinton.

=== 1960s ===
In the 1960s he performed in the emerging market known as “trade shows.” His close-up magic was known for its simplicity of technique and bold misdirection. He was one of the regulars at Ed Marlo’s ultra-secret Knights of Sleights Roundtable in Chicago. His Lake Michigan penthouse was full of mirrors so he could observe from all angles his natural body movements and their application to sleight of hand.

During the last twenty-five years of his career he was managed by the Charles Hogan Agency in Chicago, the same agency that booked Bob Hope. He emceed for the Sergio Franchi tour.

=== Death ===
In spite of deteriorating health, he continued performing until a few weeks before he his death in Tampa, Florida. In his obituary in the conjurer’s journal M-U-M his final words on death are quoted as “If I get out of this one, I’ll be a hard act to follow!”

His ashes were dispersed in the Gulf of Mexico.
