= Jock Campbell (footballer) =

Scottish footballer (1922–1983)

Personal information
- Full name: James Campbell
- Date of birth: 11 November 1922
- Place of birth: East Kilbride, Scotland
- Date of death: 7 July 1983 (aged 60)
- Place of death: Cambridge, England
- Position: Full back

Senior career*
Years	Team	Apps	(Gls)
1946–1958	Charlton Athletic	255	(1)
- * Club domestic league appearances and goals

James Campbell (11 November 1922 – 7 July 1983) was a Scottish footballer. He was in born in East Kilbride.

Campbell played as a full back in the Football League for Charlton Athletic.
