= Jack Irvin =

American politician

Carl Jackson Irvin, Jr.

Member of the Georgia House of Representatives for the 10th district
- In office 1951–1960

Personal details
- Born: January 16, 1929 Cornelia, Georgia, United States
- Died: January 25, 2008 (aged 79) Demorest, Georgia, United States
- Party: Democratic

Carl Jackson Irvin, Jr. (January 16, 1929 – January 25, 2008) was an American politician. He served in the Georgia House of Representatives from 1973 to 1985 as Democrat.
