= Jack Dowsey =

English footballer

- Dowsey at Nuneaton Town in 1934–35

Personal information
- Full name: John Dowsey
- Date of birth: 1 May 1905
- Place of birth: Willington, County Durham, England
- Date of death: 27 October 1942 (aged 37)
- Place of death: Costock, England
- Height: 5 ft 8 1/2 in (1.74 m)
- Positions: Wing-half; inside forward

Youth career
- Hunwick Villa

Senior career*
Years	Team	Apps	(Gls)
1924–1926	Newcastle United	3	(0)
1926–1927	West Ham United	1	(0)
1927	Carlisle United		
1927–1929	Sunderland	11	(1)
1929–1931	Notts County	98	(4)
1931–1934	Northampton Town	86	(5)
1934–193?	Nuneaton Town		
- * Club domestic league appearances and goals

John Dowsey (1 May 1905 – 27 October 1942) was an English professional footballer who played as a wing-half or inside-forward in the Football League for Newcastle United, West Ham United, Carlisle United, Sunderland, Notts County and Northampton Town.

Dowsey started his career with Hunwick Villa, moving to Newcastle United in June 1924. He featured regularly for the reserve team, scoring 54 goals in the North Eastern League during his two seasons at the club. He made his first of three first-team appearances for the Geordies on 14 November 1925 in a 3–1 home victory over Tottenham Hotspur.

He made the move to West Ham United in May 1926. His sole First Division appearance for the club came on 6 September 1926, where he played at inside-right in 1–0 loss to Sheffield Wednesday.

Dowsey joined Carlisle United in August 1927, then joined Sunderland in 1928. He moved to Notts County the following year and captained the team. He then joined Nuneaton Town in 1934 and played regularly in the Birmingham & District League as a centre-half.

In 1942, Dowsey hanged himself at his home in Costock, Nottinghamshire. A coroner ruled a verdict of "suicide while the balance of his mind was disturbed."
