= Jack Fritz =

Jack Fritz may refer to:

- Jack Fritz (politician) (born 1950), Micronesian politician
- Jack Fritz (radio personality) (born 1994), American sports radio personality
