= Jack Merriott =

English painter

- Born: 15 November 1901; Greenwich, London, England
- Died: 1968; Worthing, West Sussex, England
- Education: Croydon School of Art; St Martins School of Art
- Known for: Painting, Drawing
- Movement: Light impressionist
- Elected: RI, ROI, RSMA, RWS
- Patrons: British Railways; General Post Office

Jack Merriott RI, ROI, RSMA, RWS (15 November 1901 – 1968) was an English writer, artist, and poster designer famous for his artworks produced for British Railways and the General Post Office.

== Bibliography ==
- An Introduction to Water Colour. London: Artist Publishing Company. 1957. OCLC 562379988. (Volume 8 of Artist's Handbooks.)
- Drawing and Painting in Pastel. London: A & C Black. 1963. OCLC 5865251.
- Discovering Watercolour. London: Pitman. 1973. ISBN 978-0-823-01349-4.

== See also ==
- Claude Buckle
- Frank Henry Mason
- Frank Newbould
