= Jack Haley (disambiguation) =

Jack Haley (1897–1979) was an American actor.

Jack or John Haley may also refer to:

- Jack Haley Jr. (1933–2001), son of the actor, movie producer, notably of That's Entertainment!
- Jack Haley (basketball) (1964–2015), American basketball player
- John Haley (attorney), Arkansas lawyer involved in the Whitewater controversy
- John F. Haley (born 1965), known as Jack, United States Army general
- John Wesley Haley (1878–1951), pastor, missionary and mission strategist
- Jackie Earle Haley (born 1961), American actor
- Bill Haley (1925–1981), American musician, who once used "Jack Haley" as a stage name

== See also ==
- John Hailey (1835–1921), delegate to the U.S. House of Representatives from Idaho Territory
