= Old Jack =

Old Jack may refer to:

== Nickname ==
- John Driscoll (fl. 1867), Australian jockey
- J. T. Hearne (1867–1944), English cricketer
- Jacques Henry (1942–2016), French private rally driver
- Jack Hinson (c. 1807–1874), American farmer and Civil War Confederate sniper
- Stonewall Jackson (1824–1863), Confederate general during the Civil War
- Mildirn (c. 1835–c. 1914), Aboriginal leader, translator and advisor also called Old Jack Davis
- Carbine (horse) (1885–1914), New Zealand-bred Thoroughbred race horse

== Arts and entertainment ==
- Old Jack (album), the first album from Brazilian blues/rock band O Bando do Velho Jack, recorded in 1998
- the title character of Old Jack's Boat, a British pre-school children's television series (2013–2015)
