= Jack Moehle =

American civil engineer

Jack Moehle is the Ed and Diane Wilson Presidential Professor of Structural Engineering at the University of California, Berkeley.

== Education ==
Jack Moehle received his B.S. (1977), M.S. (1978), and Ph.D. (1980) in Civil Engineering from the University of Illinois.

== Professional career ==
Moehle joined the University of California, Berkeley faculty in 1980. He was the director of the Earthquake Engineering Research Center at Berkeley from 1991 to 2001 In 1996 he became the founding director of the Pacific Earthquake Engineering Research Center, where he served until 2008. He was elected a member of the National Academy of Engineering in 2014, for contributions to earthquake-resistant design and analysis of building structures, and for leadership in engineering education.

He is the author of the textbook, Seismic Design of Reinforced Concrete Buildings.

He has helped lead development of numerous codes and guidelines for the design and retrofit of structures, including Guidelines for Evaluation and Repair of Masonry and Concrete Walls (FEMA 306); Guidelines for Seismic Rehabilitation of Buildings (FEMA 273 and ASCE 356), Performance-Based Seismic Assessment Procedures (FEMA P-58), and Guidelines for Performance-Based Seismic Design of Tall Buildings (Tall Buildings Initiative, PEER).

== Awards ==
- Walter L. Huber Civil Engineering Research Prize, 1990
- Fellow of the American Concrete Institute (ACI), 1990
- The Annual Distinguished Lecture Award, Earthquake Engineering Research Institute, 2005
- Distinguished Alumnus Award, Civil Engineering, University of Illinois, Urbana-Champaign, 2005
- President's Award, Los Angeles Tall Buildings Structural Design Council, 2008.
- Fellow, Structural Engineers Association of California (SEAOC), 2008
- Award of Excellence (SEAONC), and Excellence Award (SEAOC) for Tall Buildings Initiative Guidelines, 2011
- The Top 25 Newsmakers, Engineering News Record, 2011
- Award in Excellence, for the Tall Buildings Initiative, WSSPC, 2013
- National Academy of Engineering, 2014
- Helmut Krawinkler Award, SEAONC, 2014
- Fellow, Structural Engineers Institute, American Society of Civil Engineers, 2015
- George W. Housner Medal, Earthquake Engineering Research Institute, 2020
