= Jack Shirai =

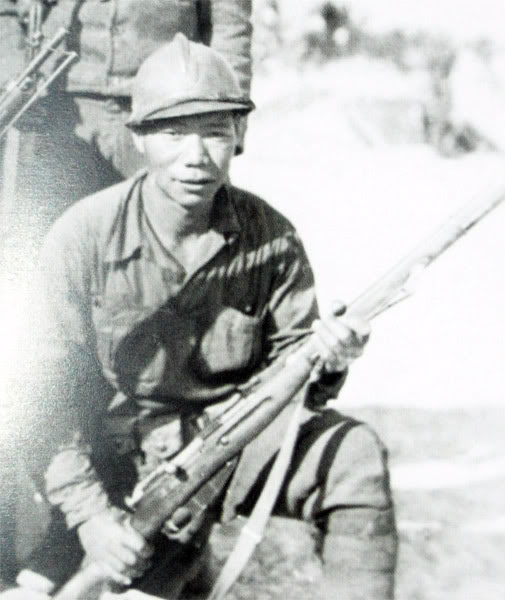
Shirai in 1937

Jack Shirai (? – July 10, 1937) was a Japanese-American activist, trade unionist, and soldier who volunteered with the Abraham Lincoln Brigade to fight for the Republicans against the Nationalists in Spain. He was killed in Brunete, in the hills of Jarama, Spain.

== Early life ==
Shirai was an orphan, who lived near Hakodate, Japan. He immigrated to the United States around 1930.

== Service ==
A cook by occupation, he served with a machine-gun unit. According to Arthur Landis in The Abraham Lincoln Brigade: "He was killed by a machine-gun burst and, like Oliver Law, they buried him that night with a notation on a board as to his ancestry and his courage." According to the Asian-American Hyphen Magazine, in an article titled The Cook With a Gun, Shirai is described as "beloved not only for his skills as a cook but also for his determination to fight for his beliefs."
