= Jack I. Abecassis =

American scholar of French literature

Jack I. Abecassis is an American scholar of French literature. He is the Edwin Sexton and Edna Patrick Smith Modern European Languages Professor and Professor of Romance Languages and Literatures at Pomona College in Claremont, California.
