= Jack Baigrie =

Canadian businessman (1929–2008)

Jack E. Baigrie (1929–2008) was most known as the General Manager of Winnipeg Videon from 1979 to about 1991.

Prior to working at Videon, he was employed at MTS in different positions in the Inside Plant Division. After that he was employed at Transport Canada in the Telecommunication & Electronics Branch in Winnipeg and Ottawa.

After leaving Transport Canada he worked at the Department of Communications as manager and as liaison between the TransCanada Telephone System, AT&T Long Lines, and other phone companies operating in the U.S.
