= Jack Rampton =

British civil servant (1920–1994)

Sir Jack Leslie Rampton, KCB (10 July 1920 – 30 March 1994) was a British civil servant.

Born in India on 10 July 1920, Rampton was the son of a businessman. He attended Tonbridge School and Trinity College, Oxford, and was unable to serve in the military during the Second World War due to poor eyesight. He was employed by HM Treasury in 1941 and was promoted to under-secretary for the public expenditure side in 1964. He was then deputy secretary of the Ministry of Technology from 1968 to 1970, and then of the new Department of Trade and Industry, where he was Second Permanent Secretary for Industrial Development from 1972 to 1974; he was knighted in 1973 as a Knight Commander of the Order of the Bath. His portfolio was particularly important as the European Community made regional development a priority, and Rampton was particularly interested in the development of British areas struggling economically.

In 1974, Rampton was appointed Permanent Secretary of the new Department of Energy, remaining there until he retired in 1980. This coincided with significant problems for the energy industry, including the oil crisis and an overtime ban for coal miners. While leading the department through these problems, he was also in charge as the UK exploited the oil and gas reserves under the North Sea, making the UK less dependent on foreign imports and domestic coal. He nevertheless clashed with the minister, Tony Benn, including about the specifications for new nuclear plants.

In retirement, he held directorships in the private sector, including the North Sea Sun Oil company, and was chairman of the British–Australia Society and the Cook Society. He died on 30 March 1994.
