= Jack B. Moore =

American business executive in the oil industry

- Born: 1953 (age 72–73); United States
- Education: University of Houston
- Occupation: Businessman
- Known for: Former chairman and CEO of Cameron International Corporation when the Deepwater Horizon oil spill occurred

Jack B. Moore is an American oil industry executive who was the chairman, president and chief executive officer of Cameron International Corporation. He became the president and CEO in April 2008 and became the chairman of the board in May 2011. He retired in quarter 4 of 2015.

== Early life and education ==
Moore was born in 1953 in the United States has a BBA from the University of Houston. He attended the six-week Advanced Management Program at Harvard Business School.

== Career ==
He first joined Cameron's Drilling & Production Systems group in July 1999 as the VP and general manager for the Western Hemisphere. In July 2002 he was then named president for this group. Prior to joining Cameron, he worked at Baker Hughes Incorporated for 23 years where he held many management positions including as the vice president, Eastern and Western Hemisphere Operations.

== Controversy ==
Moore was the president and CEO of the company already in 2010 when a BP oil rig exploded (called the Deepwater Horizon oil spill). It killed eleven workers and spilled millions of gallons of oil into the Gulf of Mexico. This caused one of the worst environmental disasters in US history. The company paid BP over $80 million in a negotiated settlement.

== Board memberships ==
Moore serves on the board of directors for the American Petroleum Institute (API), the Petroleum Equipment Suppliers Association and the National Ocean Industries Association (NOIA). He is on the board of KBR, Inc. He is active as a leader, as well, with non-profits such as the Greater Houston Partnership, Spindletop Charities, Memorial Drive United Methodist Church and The University of Houston C.T. Bauer College of Business Dean’s Executive Board.

He was appointed to the University of Houston System Board of Regents by Governor Greg Abbott in 2018 for a six-year term and will serve through August 31, 2023. For fiscal year 2017-2018, he will serve as a member of the Academic and Student Success Committee, the Endowment Management Committee and the Facilities, Construction and Master Planning Committee.
