= Jack Dugnolle =

English footballer

Personal information
- Full name: John Henry Dugnolle
- Date of birth: 24 March 1914
- Place of birth: Peshawar, British India
- Date of death: 31 August 1977 (aged 63)
- Place of death: Shoreham-by-Sea, England
- Height: 5 ft 9 in (1.75 m)
- Position: Wing half

Senior career*
| Years | Team | Apps | (Gls) |
- Hove
| 193?–1934 | Southwick | | |
| 1934–1938 | Brighton & Hove Albion | 7 | (0) |
| 1938 | Tunbridge Wells Rangers | | |
| 1938–1946 | Plymouth Argyle | 4 | (0) |
| 1946–1948 | Brighton & Hove Albion | 59 | (0) |
| 1951–195? | Horsham | | |
- * Club domestic league appearances and goals

John Henry Dugnolle (24 March 1914 – 31 August 1977) was an English professional footballer who made 70 Football League appearances playing as a wing half for Brighton & Hove Albion and Plymouth Argyle.

== Life and career ==
Dugnolle was born in 1914 in Peshawar, which was then part of British India, the son of a serving soldier in the Royal Sussex Regiment, John Henry Dugnolle, and his wife Harriett. His father, by then a second lieutenant, was killed in France in September 1915. Dugnolle attended Connaught Road School in Hove, and was a member of the Brighton Schools team that reached the final of the 1928 English Schools' Inter-Association Cup.

He played Sussex County League football for Hove and Southwick, and appeared for Brighton & Hove Albion's reserve team as an amateur, before signing professional forms with Albion in 1934. He made his senior debut in the Football League Third Division South in November 1935, but played only rarely, and returned to non-league football with Tunbridge Wells Rangers of the Southern League in 1938. He soon returned to the Football League with Plymouth Argyle, for whom he made four appearances in the Second Division before competitive football was suspended for the duration of the Second World War.

Dugnolle rejoined Brighton after the war, making 65 more appearances in all competitions and staying on to coach the youth team. He returned to the pitch as player-coach of Horsham, with whom he won the 1951–52 Metropolitan League title. He went on to coach at and manage Worthing, published a coaching manual, Soccer Simplified, and scouted for Liverpool. He died in Shoreham-by-Sea, Sussex, in 1977 at the age of 63.
