= Jack Hale =

Jack Hale may refer to:

- Jack Hale (Australian footballer) (1913–2001), Australian rules footballer
- Jack Hale (musician), American musician and player on Al Green's 1974 song "Take Me to the River"
- Jack Hale (sprinter) (born 1998), Australian track and field sprinter
- Jack Hale (swimmer) (1922–2008), British swimmer
- Jack K. Hale (1928–2009), American mathematician
