= Jack Mates =

Welsh footballer

Personal information
- Date of birth: 28 February 1870
- Place of birth: Wales

International career
Years	Team	Apps	(Gls)
1891–1897	Wales	3	(0)

Jack Mates (28 February 1870 – date of death unknown) was a Welsh international footballer. He was part of the Wales national football team between 1891 and 1897, playing 3 matches.

Mates was a member of the Chirk team that won the Welsh Cup in 1889–90, and was one of twenty internationals to have originated from the club. He played his first match for Wales on 7 February 1891 against Ireland and his last match on 29 March 1897 against England.

== See also ==
- List of Wales international footballers (alphabetical)
