= Jack Cirilo =

Peruvian footballer (born 1999)

Personal information
- Full name: Jack Harrison Cirilo Silva
- Date of birth: 27 January 1999 (age 27)
- Place of birth: Lampian, Peru
- Height: 1.82 m (6 ft 0 in)
- Position: Right winger

Team information
- Current team: ADA Cajabamba

Youth career
- 2011-2013: Unión Huaral
- 2014–2019: Alianza Lima

Senior career*
Years	Team	Apps	(Gls)
2019–2020	Alianza Lima	0	(0)
2019	→ Ayacucho (loan)	4	(1)
2020–2021	Santos de Nasca	29	(3)
2022	Unión Huaral	0	(0)
2022	Ecosem Pasco		
2023	Deportivo Binacional	15	(1)
2024	Tiro Nº 28		
2025–	ADA Cajabamba		
- * Club domestic league appearances and goals as of 21:05, 23 January 2024 (UTC)

Jack Harrison Cirilo Silva (born 26 January 1999) is a Peruvian footballer who plays as a right winger for Peruvian side ADA Cajabamba.

== Club career ==
=== Early years ===
Cirilo began playing football when he was 6 years old, when his father took him out to play with the kids from his neighborhood. His big talent was quickly discovered and he began playing for the local club Unión Huaral. After a trial in October 2013, he moved to Alianza Lima the age of 13.

=== Alianza Lima ===
Cirilo played in the Alianza Lima's youth rank's for several years, before he was promoted to the reserve team where he quickly became an important player and the captain. In January 2019, he joined Peruvian Primera División side Ayacucho FC on loan until the end of the year. He scored his first official goal in his second appearance for the team. However, he only made a total of for appearances and was mostly used for the reserve team, where he became the captain and scored 15 goals in the 2019 season.

Cirilo returned to Alianza for the 2020 season.

=== Later years ===
On 15 September 2020 it was confirmed, that Cirilo had left Alianza to join Peruvian Segunda División side Santos de Nasca. He left the club at the end of 2021. In July 2022, Cirilo returned to his former club, Unión Huaral. In September 2022, he moved to Ecosem Pasco.

In December 2022, ahead of the 2023 season, Cirilo moved to Deportivo Binacional. In February 2024, Cirilo joined Tiro Nº 28.
