= Jack Flaherty (disambiguation) =

Jack Flaherty (born 1995) is an American baseball pitcher for the Los Angeles Dodgers.

Jack Flaherty may also refer to:

- Jack Flaherty (gymnast) (1908–1980), British Olympic gymnast
- Jack Flaherty (politician) (1933–2025), Canadian politician and member of the Legislative Assembly of Alberta

== See also ==
- John Flaherty (disambiguation)
