= Jack Catley =

English footballer

Personal information
- Full name: John William Catley
- Date of birth: 16 March 1945 (age 81)
- Place of birth: Grimsby, England
- Position: Winger

Senior career*
Years	Team	Apps	(Gls)
1962–1963	Grimsby Town	2	(0)
- * Club domestic league appearances and goals

John William Catley (born 16 March 1945) is an English former professional footballer who played as a winger.
