= John Kirby (cricketer) =

English cricketer

Personal information
- Full name: John Edward Weston Kirby
- Born: 4 February 1936 (age 90); Low Fell, County Durham, England
- Batting: Right-handed
- Bowling: Right-arm medium

Domestic team information
- Years: Team
- 1956: Oxford University

Career statistics
Competition	First-class
Matches	3
Runs scored	78
Batting average	13.00
100s/50s	–/–
Top score	28
Catches/stumpings	4/–
- Source: Cricinfo, 18 June 2020

John Edward Weston Kirby (born 4 February 1936) is an English former first-class cricketer.

== Biography ==
Kirby was born in February 1936 at Low Fell, County Durham. He was educated at Ampleforth College, before going up to Corpus Christi College, Oxford. While studying at Oxford, he made three appearances in first-class cricket for Oxford University in 1956, against the Free Foresters, Nottinghamshire and Sussex. He scored 78 runs in his three matches, with a high score of 28.
