= Jack Abbott (footballer) =

British association football player

Personal information
- Full name: John Abbott
- Date of birth: 25 May 1943
- Place of birth: Winsford, England
- Date of death: December 2002 (aged 59)
- Place of death: Cheshire, England
- Position: Defender

Senior career*
| Years | Team | Apps | (Gls) |
| 1960–1961 | Winsford United | ? | (?) |
| 1961–1965 | Crewe Alexandra | 2 | (0) |
| | Oswestry Town | ? | (?) |
- * Club domestic league appearances and goals

John Abbott (25 May 1943 – December 2002) was an English professional footballer who played in the Football League for Crewe Alexandra as a centre-half.
