= Jack Soren =

Canadian writer (born 1962)

Marty Soderstrom
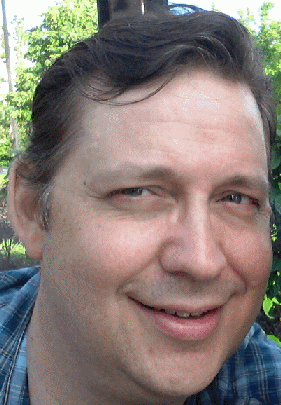
- Jack Soren, Toronto, Canada (2014)
- Born: Martin Richard Soderstrom; September 7, 1962 (age 64); Toronto, Canada
- Occupation: Novelist
- Writing career
- Pen name: Jack Soren, Martin R. Soderstrom
- Genres: Action-adventure, Action-thriller, Adventure, Mystery, Techno-thriller

Jack Soren is the pen name of Canadian writer Martin Richard Soderstrom, a writer of action-adventure/thriller novels. He was born and raised in Toronto, Canada, and is now a resident of Oshawa, Canada.

Under the name Martin R. Soderstrom, he has published horror and science fiction short stories.

== Biographical Sketch ==
Soderstrom's father was a salesman, and his mother was a part-time bookkeeper for a local law firm. He had one younger brother. The family lived in the Toronto suburbs in a detached brick house with a large backyard.

He attended Anson Park Public School and later R.H. King Collegiate Institute. He went on to study journalism at Centennial College in Toronto.

== Published works ==
Soderstrom sold his first novel, The Monarch (2014), under the pen name of Jack Soren to HarperCollins. The novel was picked out for the new imprint, Witness Impulse. Soren's editor asked him to turn the standalone thriller into a series. With The Tomorrow Heist (2015), the two books became The Monarch Series.

The digital edition of The Monarch was published in December 2014 while the Trade Paperback edition came out in January 2015. The book was translated and published in Germany, Japan, France, and the Netherlands.

In June 2015, The Monarch was short-listed for the Kobo Emerging Writer Prize.

The Monarch Series follows international art thief Johnathan Hall. In the first book in the series, The Monarch (2014), Hall is pulled back from retirement after mutilated bodies of New York's elite were found, carved with The Monarch's signature symbol.

In the following novel, The Tomorrow Heist (2015), Jonathan Hall pairs with Lew Katchbrow and joins a dark organization which leads them to discover the truth behind Ashita, a futuristic city in the depths of the Pacific Ocean.

== Bibliography ==
=== As Jack Soren ===
==== The Monarch series ====
1. The Monarch (2014)
2. The Tomorrow Heist (2015)

==== Stand-alone work ====
- Slaybells (novella) (2014)

=== As Martin R. Soderstrom ===
- Roommates (1989) [short story] Tyro Magazine #21
- A Little Matter (1990) [short story] Figment Magazine #5
- The Rabbit Hole (1995) [short story] Deathrealm #25
- Forever Young (1995) [short story] 100 Vicious Little Vampire Stories Anthology
- In the Cards (1995) [short story] 100 Wicked Little Witches Anthology
- Family (1998) [short story] Dark Muse Ezine #1
- The Root of All Evil (1998) [short story] IF Magazine #2
- Empathy's Bed at Midnight (1998) [short story] Horrors! 365 Scary Stories Anthology
- X-Files and Sliders Trivia (1999) [trivia questions] Sci-Fi Channel SF Trivia CD-ROM
- Forever Young (2000) [movie option] Animate 2000, Inc.
- The Find (2000) [short story] Transversions Anthology
- Spark (2007) [short story] Zombies Anthology, Altair Australia Books
- The Pond (2008) [short story] Don't Turn On The Lights Anthology

=== Awards ===
- Forever Young (1996), Honorable Mention, Year's Best Fantasy and Horror #9
- The Monarch (2015) short-listed for the Kobo Emerging Writer Prize
