= Jock Lineen =

Australian rules footballer

Personal information
- Full name: Jock Lineen
- Born: 17 February 1928
- Died: 12 April 2022 (aged 94)
- Original team: Cororooke
- Height: 191 cm (6 ft 3 in)
- Weight: 86 kg (190 lb)
- Position: Ruck

Playing career^{1}
Years	Club	Games (Goals)
1947, 1949–54	North Melbourne	53 (1)
- ^{1} Playing statistics correct to the end of 1954.

Jock Lineen (17 February 1928 – 12 April 2022) was an Australian rules footballer who played with North Melbourne in the Victorian Football League (VFL).
