= Jack Duncliffe =

English footballer

Personal information
- Full name: Michael John Duncliffe
- Date of birth: 17 September 1947 (age 79)
- Place of birth: Brighton, England
- Height: 5 ft 8 in (1.73 m)
- Position: Full back

Senior career*
Years	Team	Apps	(Gls)
1965–1968	Brighton & Hove Albion	22	(0)
1968–1970	Grimsby Town	72	(0)
1970–1973	Peterborough United	120	(0)
1973–1974	Cambridge City		
1974–197?	Wisbech Town		
- * Club domestic league appearances and goals

Michael John Duncliffe (born 17 September 1947) is an English former professional footballer who made more than 200 appearances in the Football League playing as a full back for Brighton & Hove Albion, Grimsby Town and Peterborough United.
