= Jack Wilson (writer) =

John "Jack" Aiken Wilson
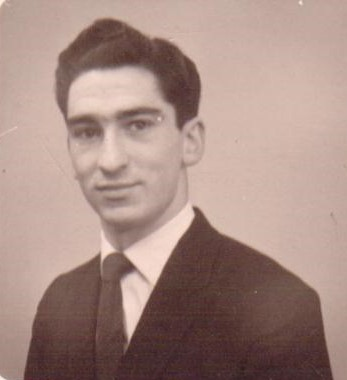
- Jack Wilson in 1960
- Born: 2 October 1937; Ballyrobert, Craigavad, Co Down, Northern Ireland
- Died: 15 December 1997 (aged 60)
- Occupations: Novelist; Boxer
- Spouse: Vera Wilson (married 1963)
- Children: 1

John Aiken Wilson (2 October 1937 – 15 December 1997) was a Northern Irish born novelist, a successful amateur boxer and notable literary figure in Ireland in the late 1960s.

== Early life ==
Wilson was born in Ballyrobert, Craigavad, County Down to James and Eileen (née Aiken) Wilson. He had four brothers and one sister. At the age of eleven he developed abdominal tuberculosis, a disease which almost ended his life. Prevented from joining in lessons with other children, Wilson was given books to read by his teacher, a Mr Cameron, and he quickly developed a love for the works of Robert Louis Stevenson, C. S. Forester and James Fenimore Cooper.

After being bedridden for almost a year, Wilson was eventually cured of his illness and he returned to school. However, stunted growth, a curvature of the spine and a chronic lack of self-confidence were the lifelong legacies of the tuberculosis.

In 1948, Wilson's father died due to pulmonary tuberculosis, and the family moved first to Newry, then to Comber, where they settled until the late 1950s.

== Boxing career ==
Living in a rural environment, Wilson sought to strengthen his damaged body through physical exercise, and he was put to work, alongside his younger brother, Maurice, on farms and in the fields around Scrabo Tower, an area of natural beauty at the northern end of Strangford Lough. This experience would later provide much of the material for his first novel, The Wild Summer.

In his late teens, Wilson was tasked by his mother to extract his brother Maurice from a boxing club the younger sibling had joined recently. Wilson returned to his mother with news that he too had joined the Crown Club.

Over the course of the next few years, both Wilson and Maurice established a reputation as being very good amateur fighters, Wilson first at flyweight and Maurice as a welterweight. Wilson's lower torso had been affected by his illness, however, his long arms, strong jaw and heavy punching ability soon landed him a fight for the Ulster (Junior) Flyweight Championship in 1960.

Fighting against the favourite, Brian Wright, proved a test of nerves for Wilson in the first round. However, after his trainer, Arthur Anderson gave him the advice, 'he's shown you what he can do, so now you show him what you can do', Wilson struck first and tellingly in the second, and the fight finished early due to knockout. Over the course of Wilson's amateur career he may have won up to 32 of his 35 fights with one disqualification, controversially, in the Irish Flyweight title fight in Dublin.

== Writing career ==
Whilst Wilson enjoyed success as an amateur boxer, turning down opportunities to turn professional, his childhood love of reading novels grew into a desire to write them. In between fights, Wilson would buy books to learn how to write, primarily using William Faulkner, Ernest Hemingway and John Steinbeck as his teachers.

In 1962, he submitted his first novel, The Wild Summer, a coming-of-age story drawn out from his experiences of working in the County Down fields, to Friedrich Muller Limited. The following year Muller published the novel, and this was followed in 1964 by Adam Grey, in 1967 by the Tomorrow Country and Dark Eden in 1969.

With Adam Grey, Wilson had his most commercial success, with a film company allegedly courting Julie Christie and Adam Faith to play the lead roles. However, due to the financial collapse of the production company, Wilson had to be content with Corgi Books releasing Adam Grey in paperback, under the new title of The Nightcomer.

Throughout his writing career, Wilson had articles published for local newspapers and had radio plays broadcast by the BBC. He was also the chairman of the Irish PEN (Poets, Essayists and Novelists).

The Wild Summer was republished in 2001 by Lagan Press.

== Personal life ==
Wilson was married to Vera Munn on 2 October 1963. They had one child. Wilson was a keen supporter of Manchester United Football Club, and continued to follow boxing.

In 1997 he died due to sepsis brought on by a compromised immune system after treatment for oesophageal cancer. He is survived by his wife and son.
