= Jack Maumbe Mukhwana =

Ugandan politician, activist and war veteran (1939-2017)

Honourable Jack Maumbe Mukhwana
- Born: April.18.1939; Mbale, Uganda
- Died: 27 Feb 2017; Mbale, Uganda
- Years active: 1986.........2017
- Title: Minister Of Information (1986–1996) Member Of Parliament Mbale (1996–2000)
- Term: 1986–1996 and 1996–2000
- Political party: National Resistance Movement (N.R.M)

Jack Maumbe Mukhwana (18 April 1939 – 27 February 2017) was a Ugandan politician, civil rights activist, war veteran and community Activist. He was one of the core founders of the ruling National Resistance Movement (NRM) Political Party in Uganda alongside President Yoweri Museveni.

== Early life ==
Jack Maumbe Mukhwana was born in a polygamous family in Busiu, Mbale district in Eastern Uganda but later relocated to Mabanga village in Bungokho sub country, Busilikori parish. He went to Nabongo Primary School, Nabumali SSS and finally Makerere University where he later on met and married his wife Beth Maumbe in 1970. He had six children.

== Political career ==
He fought in the liberation struggle against the dictatorial regime of Idi Amin. He was a rebel of a group that was known as Front for National Salvation (FRONASA) alongside other veterans like Museveni who was by then the leader. He was also a community activist who acted as a medium between the Eastern Uganda politicians and the central government in cases of disagreement and opposition. At a certain point in the struggle for liberation, he is notably remembered for hiding and shielding President Museveni from Idi Amin's soldiers who were ready to massacre all the FRONASA members who were by then rebels. In 1986 Jack was appointed a Deputy Minister for information and later on a member of parliament of Mbale district.

== Death ==
He died of colon cancer on 27 February 2017.

== See also ==
- Yoweri Kaguta Museveni
- Lanie Banks
- Lydia Wanyotto
- James Wapakhabulo
