= Jack Brittain =

American academic

- Occupation: Professor

Academic background
- Education: University of California, Berkeley

Jack William Brittain is a professor at the David Eccles School of Business at the University of Utah, and served as dean from 1999 to 2008. He holds the Pierre Lassonde Presidential Chair in Entrepreneurship.
