= Jack Vale =

Jack Vale may refer to:

- Jack Vale (Australian footballer) (1905–1970), Australian footballer
- Jack Vale (comedian) (born 1973), American comedian
- Jack Vale (footballer, born 2001), Welsh footballer
