= Jack Townend =

British illustrator and graphic artist (1918–2005)

Photograph of Jack Townend, 1947

Jack Townend (1918–2005) was a British illustrator and graphic artist. He was best known for his lithographic children's books, his contemporaries include Jan Lewitt, George Him, Hans Tisdall and Barnett Freedman.

== Early life ==
Jack Townend was born on 30 March 1918 in Bingley, Yorkshire. He attended the local grammar school, obtaining a school certificate, and in 1936 enrolled in the Bradford College of Arts and Crafts, graduating in 1938.

At 20, Townend moved first to Hampstead, London, and then to Watford. He studied at the Slade School of Art – under the direction of Randolph Schwabe. With the outbreak of war, Schwabe oversaw the evacuation of the Slade to the Ruskin School of Drawing and Fine Art, University of Oxford. He collaborated with his friend Albert Rutherston, the Ruskin Master of Drawing, to combine the two schools for the duration of the war. Townend moved to Oxford in 1940 for the final year of his diploma, living at 70 Walton Street and remaining in the city for the next 50 years. Among his Slade contemporaries were landscape painter Kyffin Williams, Picasso scholar John Richardson, interior designer and antiques dealer Geoffrey Bennison, and artist Milein Cosman.

Townend graduated with a Diploma in Fine Art in June 1941, and won two first prize awards of £3 for engraving and lithography, possibly while studying under illustrator Harold Jones.

== Publications ==
During the war, Townend wrote and illustrated books for the London publishing house Faber and Faber. The first, A Railway ABC, was released in 1942 and was printed at Gilmour & Dean in Glasgow. It was later published in the US by Franklin Watts as Railroad ABC, with different colour illustrations by Denison Budd

In 1944, Townend published two more books with Faber and Faber: Jenny the Jeep a tale of a bullied, pink army jeep who saves the day and becomes a war hero; Ben a love story about a hardworking lonely steam roller who falls for Matilda, another steam roller. In 1945, A Story about Ducks was released; a group of ducks go on a series of adventures only to realise there is no place like home.

These three books were published lithographically at the Baynard Press in London, during a period of ink and paper rationing. Around this time the press was also printing books by artists such as Enid Marx and Leslie Wood.

In 1947, Townend produced one of his most celebrated books: The Clothes We Wear, number 64 in the Puffin Picture Book series. It was described by Joe Pearson in Drawn Direct to Plate (2010) as being "the only title...to offer a modernist cover...one of the most striking of the series with Freedmanesque lettering." This was also printed at the Baynard Press.

Through the 1950s and 1960s, it is believed that Townend only illustrated a handful of books: Charles Dickens' David Copperfield for Oxford University Press, Eric Baxter's The Study Book of Water Supply for the Bodley Head, Evan Owen's What Happened Today: An Almanack of History, and in 1971, Alan James' book Buses and Coaches.

His children's books form part of the Renier Collection of Children's Literature in the Victoria and Albert Museum's National Art Library, which includes over 100,000 children's books. Previously out of print, A Railway ABC, Jenny the Jeep, Ben and A Story about Ducks were reprinted by V&A Publishing, London, in 2014 and 2015.

== Teaching, appointments and awards ==
Very little is known about Townend's war work, although his Oxford Slade records show that he was an Acting Pilot Officer on probation. It is unknown how long this lasted, nor why the post seems to have finished before the war ended. Townend's name is included, however, on the Slade-Ruskin's assistant staff list for the academic year 1942–43, and in 1944–45, he stayed on as a wood-engraving tutor.

He was elected a Fellow of the Royal Society of Arts in 1946. This honour is granted to those who have demonstrated significant achievements in the arts.

In 1949–51, he was employed by the Ruskin School of Art to teach lithography composition, design and wood-engraving. He tutored, among others, author and illustrator Shirley Hughes. In A Life Drawing: Recollections of an Illustrator (2002), Hughes recalls a lithography class taught one day a week by Townend. A "dapper, bearded and bow-tied figure with a high falsetto voice...[He was] a strict, critical and humorous teacher. He took the work we did seriously and he taught me a lot." She credits Townend as being responsible for her career in book illustration

Between 1952 and 1961 Townend taught graphic design, lithography and printmaking at the Ruskin, where Enid Marx is also listed as a teacher for the 1952–53 academic year. During the 1950s and 1960s, he taught at the New College and Greycotes schools, and later acted as an art advisor for the Oxford City Council.

In the 1990s, Townend left Oxford and returned to his hometown, Bingley. He settled in a house just around the corner from where he was raised. He died on 15 May 2005, soon after his 87th birthday.

== Select bibliography ==
- Nature (Basil Blackwell, illustrated by Jack Townend, 1953) - a slim early words children's picture book
- Townend, Jack. A Railway ABC. (Reprint edition, V&A Publishing, 2014)
- Townend, Jack. Story About Ducks. (Reprint edition, V&A Publishing, 2014)
- Townend, Jack. Jenny the Jeep. (Reprint edition V&A Publishing, 2015)
- Townend, Jack. Ben. (Reprint edition, V&A Publishing, 2015)
