= Jack Meltzer =

American urban renewal advocate (1921–2010)

Jack Meltzer (August 21, 1921 – May 5, 2010) was a leading figure of urban renewal during the 1950s and 1960s primarily in the Hyde Park neighborhood on the South Side of Chicago, Illinois. He was one of three people who most shaped the direction of the future Hyde Park. He was dean of the School of Social Sciences at the University of Texas at Dallas.

== Academics ==
Meltzer studied at Wayne University (now Wayne State University) in Detroit before going on to earn a master's degree in political science from the University of Chicago in 1947. In 1983, he became dean of the School of Social Sciences at the University of Texas at Dallas. He retired in 1986, and relocated to Washington, D.C.

== The 1950s ==
As director of planning for the South East Chicago Commission from 1954 to 1958, he took on the job of planning how millions in federal money would be spent to fend off blight in Chicago's Hyde Park and Kenwood neighborhoods. The Hyde Park Herald newspaper praised Meltzer as "a young man with a sense of humor and a sense of responsibility" in 1954 when "He was the planner in the middle of the maelstrom", said Bruce Sagan, then and now publisher of the Herald. "As a planner he had this wonderful moment to work out this new idea— the problem was it was a very controversial idea." Throughout the mid-1950s, Meltzer was the public face of a program that dramatically reshaped the physical landscape of Hyde Park and cemented the neighborhood's reputation for public engagement on all public projects. "No planner can proceed with a disregard for the wishes of the community if he is to succeed. I hope the various civic groups in the community will make known their ideas and wishes to me," Meltzer said when he took up the planning of urban renewal in 1954. Meltzer remained calm at the time when neighbors and parents harshly rebuked him for his plan to demolish housing to make way for a school expansion.

"The amazing thing about Hyde Park ... is not its problems but the fact that it has resisted them", Meltzer said in 1956.

== The 1960s ==
Meltzer would reinsert himself in the city planning process again in 1964 as the city planned the expansion and rerouting of a multi-lane highway through the city's Jackson Park. As neighborhood groups and then-Mayor Richard J. Daley clashed over competing plans, Meltzer stepped in and offered to draft a compromise plan himself. After leaving his role at the South East Chicago Commission in 1963, Meltzer would stay in Hyde Park for another 20 years as the first director of the Center for Urban Studies at the University of Chicago.
