= Jack Nasher =

Germany author

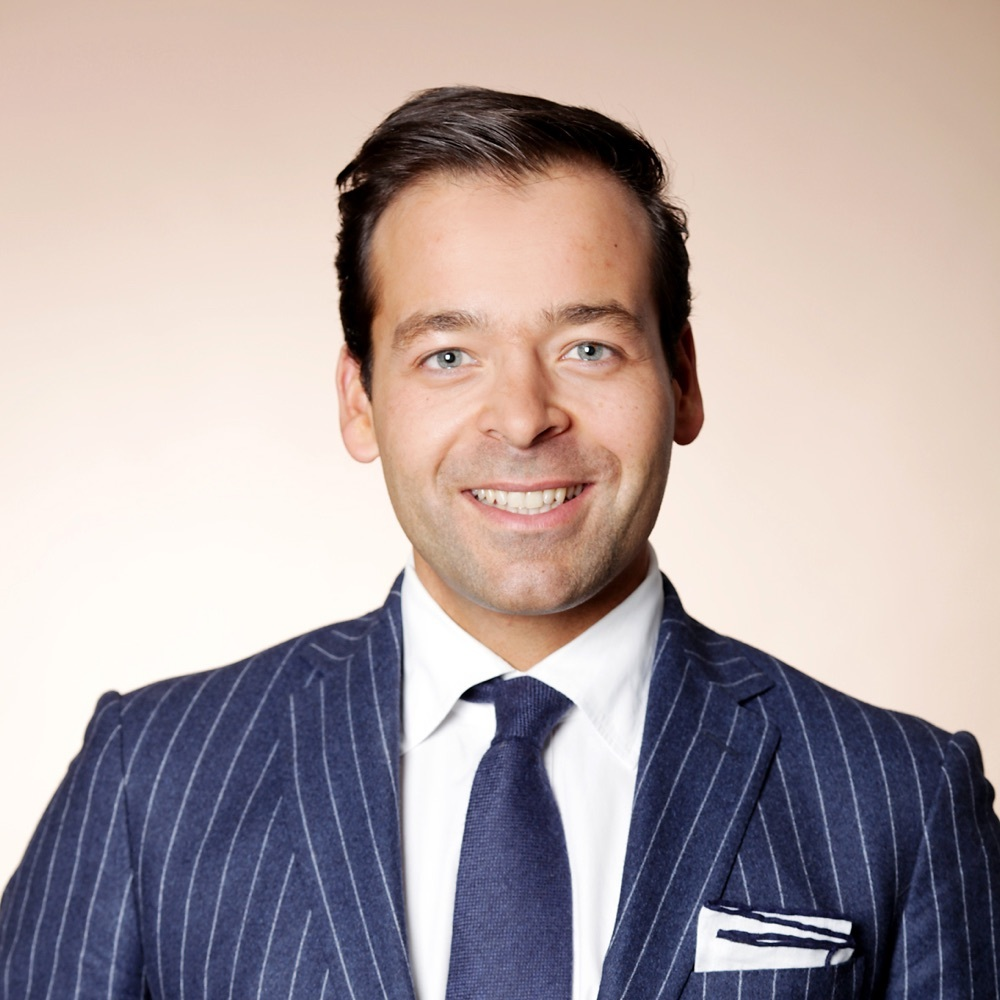
- Born: Jack Lord Nasher-Awakemian; 1 June 1979 (age 47); Korbach, Germany
- Occupations: Management psychologist; author; professor
- Years active: 2004–present
- Known for: Negotiation, business psychology, mentalism

Jack Nasher (born Jack Lord Nasher-Awakemian; 1 June 1979) is a German author, negotiation advisor.

== Early life and education ==
Nasher went to school in Germany, France, and in the United States. He received a master's degree in Philosophy and Psychology at Trier University. After that, he studied Management Sciences for a year at Oxford before studying law from 2004-2008 at the Frankfurt University. At Oxford, Nasher was a Research Associate of Holywell Manor, Oxford. Parallel to his law studies, Nasher completed a doctorate in philosophy at Vienna University. Nasher concluded his legal training at the European Court of Justice, the European Parliament, the law firm Skadden, Arps, Slate, Meagher & Flom. and the German mission to the United Nations in New York City.

== Career ==
=== Teaching ===
Nasher started his teaching career as a tutor at Oxford University, where he also conducted interviews for prospective students, before being appointed Professor for Leadership and Organization at Munich Business School in 2010. At the time of his appointment, he was the youngest professor in the state of Bavaria. His professorship at Munich Business School ended in September 2023. He is a visiting faculty of the Bing Overseas Studies Program at Stanford University

=== Works ===
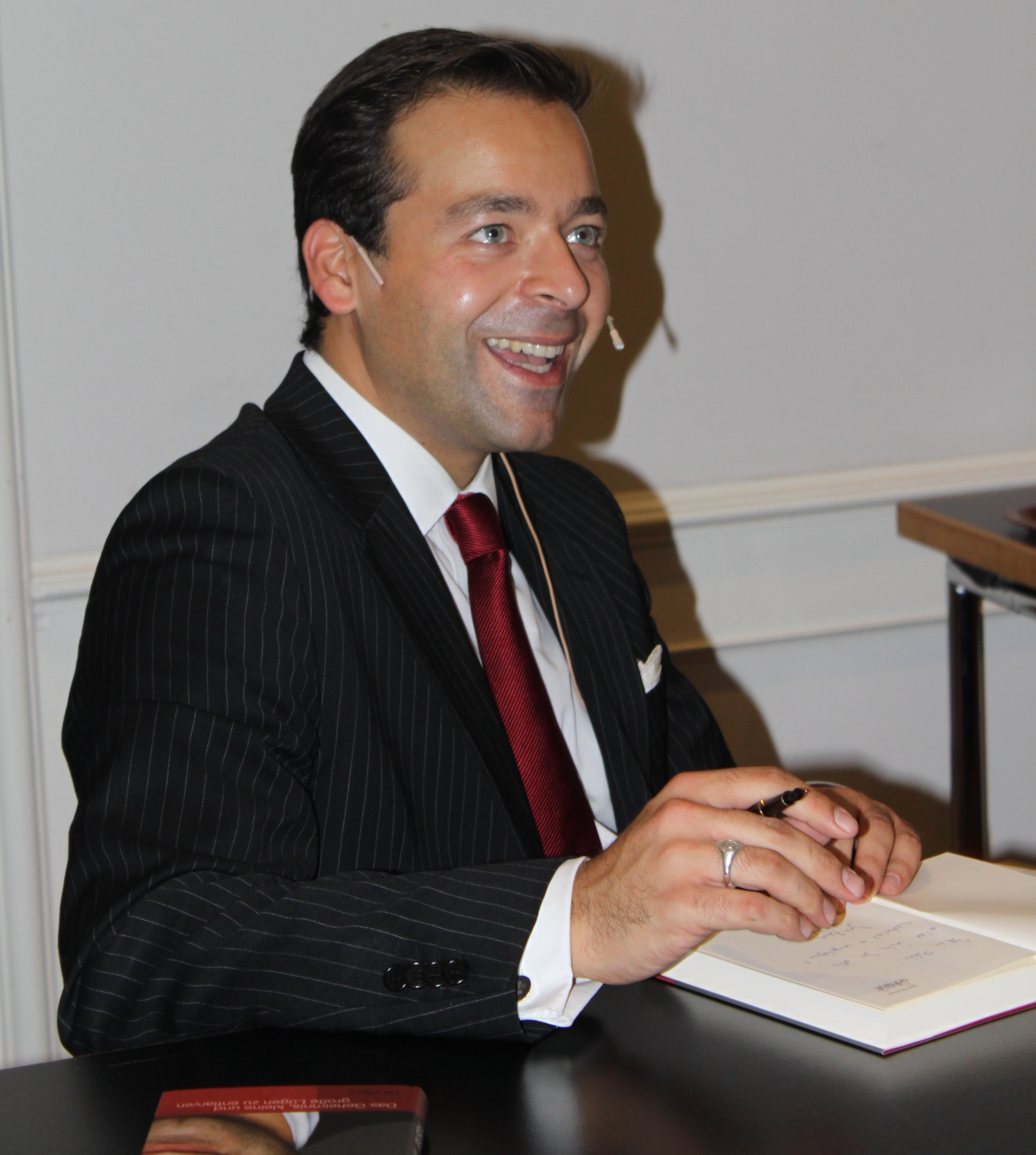
Jack Nasher in 2013

Nasher mostly applies psychological concepts in order to assess and influence individuals, mostly in the context of negotiations. He is a contributor for Forbes and authors the annual Top 10 list of "World Changing Negotiations". Nasher's books reached were published in the USA, the United Kingdom, Australia, India, Germany, Austria, Switzerland, Poland, Czech Republic, Korea, Russia, Taiwan, Japan, Mexico and China.

Nasher's work has been covered in publications such as The Wall Street Journal, ZEIT, Fast Company, Inc. and Forbes.

- Deal! Frankfurt/New York: Campus 2013, ISBN 978-3593398211 reached multiple bestselling status in Germany, became one of Germany's best selling business books of the year and was considered one of the best career books of the year. It was subsequently published in Russia, Korea, Taiwan, China, Japan, Austria and in Switzerland.
- CONVINCED! How to Prove Your Competence and Win People Over. Berrett-Koehler 2018, ISBN 9781523095599 was published in Germany, Austria, Switzerland, China, Korea, Russia, Poland, Mexico, the USA, Canada, India, the United Kingdom, and Australia.
- Durchschaut! Das Geheimnis, kleine und große Lügen zu entlarven. Random House 2010, ISBN 978-3-453-16992-0 also published in China, Korea, Taiwan, Poland, Czech Republic, Austria and Switzerland.

== Awards and memberships ==
- In 2016, Nasher received the Gold Medal for best paper at the International Conference on Applied Psychology in Colombo/Sri Lanka
- Full member, Society of Personality & Social Psychology
- Principle Practitioner, Association of Business Psychologists

== Philanthropy ==
Nasher donated his royalties from his book publication on Karl Popper's Open Society ("Die Staatstheorie Karl Poppers") to Human Rights Watch, a nonprofit, nongovernmental organization.

== Trivia ==
Nasher is an avid mentalist and regularly performs at The Magic Castle in Hollywood, California. He has performed in the show Manhattan Magic on Times Square in New York City in 2009., and was a participant in the German TV-Show The next Uri Geller.

Nasher acted as a co-executive producer for the British gangster movie "The Smoke" that was introduced at the Marbella International Film Festival.

He is a cousin of the Afghan singer Farhad Darya.

== Conferences ==
- What Makes Leaders Look Great? Actual and Perceived Competence of Leaders; interactive poster presented at the 42nd Annual Conference of the European International Business Academy (EIBA), 2–5 December 2016, Vienna/Austria.
- The Art of Showing Expertise, CECE Congress "Industry in Transformation. Drivers of Success"; 5–7 October 2016, Prague/Czech Republic
- Casting a Brick for a Jade, 6th International Biennial on Negotiation, 16–18 November, Paris/France
- The Impression of Competence, International Conference on Applied Psychology, 26–28 August 2016, Colombo/Sri Lanka.
- The Norm of Reciprocity Revisited, 11th Global Research Symposium, 15–17 June 2016, Rome/Italy.
