= Jack Oyugi =

Jack Oyugi is an entrepreneur from Kenya known for developing Aquaprotein animal feed from water hyacinth, an invasive species in Lake Victoria.

Oyugi worked as a dairy farm manager and observed that water hyacinth would be consumed by cows up to the point where it became inundated with heavy metals. In 2016, he started a company which harvested hyacinth and processed it with a fungus to increase protein levels from 14% to 50% to create a product able to be used as feed. Fishermen on Lake Victoria harvest the hyacinth. The byproduct can also be used as fertilizer.
