= Jack Banta =

Jack Banta may refer to:

- Jack Banta (American football) (1917–1977), American football halfback
- Jack Banta (baseball) (1925–2006), American baseball pitcher
