= Jack Paton =

Scottish cricketer

Personal information
- Full name: John Paton
- Born: 25 August 1881; Dunfermline, Fife, Scotland
- Died: 22 August 1935 (aged 53); Dunfermline, Fife, Scotland
- Batting: Unknown
- Bowling: Unknown-arm slow

Domestic team information
- Years: Team
- 1914: Scotland

Career statistics
Competition	First-class
Matches	1
Runs scored	2
Batting average	1.00
100s/50s	–/–
Top score	2
Balls bowled	155
Wickets	5
Bowling average	17.60
5 wickets in innings	–
10 wickets in match	–
Best bowling	4/33
Catches/stumpings	1/–
- Source: Cricinfo, 15 July 2022

John Paton (25 August 1881 – 22 August 1935) was a Scottish first-class cricketer.

Paton was born at Dunfermline in August 1881. A club cricketer for Dunfermline Cricket Club, Paton was invited to play for the Rest of Scotland in 1913 on the back of strong bowling performances at club level. The following year he was selected for the senior Scotland team, playing in a first-class match against Ireland at Dublin. Playing as a bowler, he led the Scottish bowling figures in the Irish second innings with figures of 4 for 48, adding to the wicket of William Meldon that he took in the Irish first innings. Batting at the tail, he was dismissed for 2 runs in the Scottish first innings by Meldon, while in their second innings he was dismissed without scoring in the Scottish first innings by Basil Ward. At club level, Paton was a useful all-rounder who played for Fifeshire after the First World War and captained the side in 1921, but returned to Dumfermline to captain the side for the 1922 season. It was noted that following the war, Paton was employed in a government office at Perth. He died at Dunfermline in August 1935.
