= Jack Gamble =

English rugby league footballer

Playing information
- Position: Centre
Club
Years	Team	Pld	T	G	FG	P
1962–67	Castleford	101	39	0	0	117
1967–68	Halifax	12	5	0	0	15
	Total	113	44	0	0	132
Representative
Years	Team	Pld	T	G	FG	P
1965	Yorkshire	1	0	0	0	0
1966	Great Britain U24	1	0	0	0	0

Jack Gamble is a former professional rugby league footballer who played in the 1960s. He played at representative level for Yorkshire, and at club level for Castleford, as a centre.

== Playing career ==
=== Club career ===
Gamble played in Castleford's victory in the Yorkshire League during the 1964–65 season.

In January 1967, he was sold to Halifax for a fee of £5,000.

=== Representative honours ===
Gamble won a cap playing centre for Yorkshire while at Castleford in the 15-9 victory over New Zealand at Castleford's stadium on 20 September 1965.
