= Jack Lindsay (footballer, born 1921) =

Scottish footballer

Personal information
- Full name: John McArthur Lindsay
- Date of birth: 11 December 1921
- Place of birth: Flemington, Scotland
- Date of death: 9 February 2006 (aged 84)
- Place of death: Carlisle, England
- Position: Forward

Youth career
- Kerrydale Celtic

Senior career*
Years	Team	Apps	(Gls)
1944–1945	Greenock Morton		
1946	Sheffield Wednesday	1	(1)
1946–1947	Bury	11	(7)
1947–1950	Carlisle United	103	(46)
1950–1952	Southport	50	(20)
1952–1954	Wigan Athletic	88	(21)
1954–1955	Carlisle United	13	(2)
1956–1957	Wigan Athletic	16	(0)
- * Club domestic league appearances and goals

John McArthur Lindsay (11 December 1921 – 9 February 2006) was a Scottish footballer who played in The Football League for Sheffield Wednesday, Bury, Carlisle United and Southport.

In 1952, he joined Wigan Athletic. In two spells at the club he made a combined total of 104 Lancashire Combination appearances, scoring 21 goals.
