= Jack Otter =

American journalist and editor

- Occupation(s): journalist and editor

Jack Otter is an American journalist and editor with Barrons.com. He is the author of Worth It...Not Worth It: Simple & Profitable Answers to Life's Tough Financial Questions, which was published by Business Plus, a division of Hachette, in May 2012.

Previously, Otter was executive editor at CBS MoneyWatch.com, deputy editor of Rodale's Best Life and former articles editor at SmartMoney. He has appeared on CNN, CNBC, NBC, Today, The Early Show and CBS This Morning. He has written for publications including The Wall Street Journal, O magazine and The New Yorker.
