= Jock Archibald =

Scottish footballer

Personal information
- Full name: John Archibald
- Date of birth: 25 August 1895
- Place of birth: Strathaven, Scotland
- Date of death: 1967 (aged 71–72)
- Height: 6 ft 0 in (1.83 m)
- Position: Goalkeeper

Senior career*
Years	Team	Apps	(Gls)
1912–1919	Albion Rovers	7	(0)
1919–1920	Reading		
1920–1921	Chelsea	0	(0)
1921–1922	St Bernard's	32	(0)
1922–1923	Newcastle United	1	(0)
1923–1926	Grimsby Town	111	(0)
1926–1928	Darlington	41	(0)
1928	Albion Rovers	6	(0)
1928–1929	East Stirlingshire	4	(0)
1929	Clydebank	6	(0)
- * Club domestic league appearances and goals

John Archibald (25 August 1895 – 1967) was a Scottish professional football goalkeeper who played in the Football League for Darlington, Grimsby Town and Newcastle United. He also played in the Scottish League for St Bernard's, Albion Rovers, East Stirlingshire and Clydebank.

== Personal life ==
Archibald was the younger brother of footballer Bobby Archibald. During the First World War, Archibald served in the Royal Field Artillery and saw action at Gallipoli.

== Career statistics ==
Appearances and goals by club, season and competition
Club	Season	League			National Cup		Total	
Club	Season	Division	Apps	Goals	Apps	Goals	Apps	Goals
Albion Rovers	1912–13	Scottish Second Division	16	0	0	0	16	0
Albion Rovers	1913–14	Scottish Second Division	1	0	0	0	1	0
Albion Rovers	Total		17	0	0	0	17	0
St Bernard's	1921–22	Scottish Second Division	32	0	0	0	32	0
Newcastle United	1921–22	First Division	1	0	―		1	0
Albion Rovers	1928–29	Scottish Second Division	6	0	―		6	0
Albion Rovers	Albion Rovers total		23	0	0	0	23	0
East Stirlingshire	1928–29	Scottish Second Division	4	0	0	0	4	0
Clydebank	1928–29	Scottish Second Division	6	0	―		6	0
Career total			66	0	0	0	66	0

== Honours ==
Grimsby Town

- Football League Third Division North: 1925–26
