= Jack Fettes =

British basketball player

No. 30 – Surrey Scorchers
- Position: Guard
- League: British Basketball League

Personal information
- Born: 30 November 1999 (age 26) Chertsey
- Listed height: 6 ft 2 in (1.88 m)

Career information
- High school: Riverdale High
- College: Charnwood College (2016–2017); Three Rivers Academy (2017–2019); Plymouth Marjon University (2019–present)
- Playing career: 2018–2019

Career history
- 2018–2019: Surrey Scorchers

Career highlights
- none

Jack Fettes (born 30 November 1999) is a British semi-professional basketball player who most recently played for the Surrey Scorchers in the British Basketball League.

== College career ==
Fettes played for Charnwood College before joining the Three Rivers Academy in the Academy Basketball League. In 2017, the school announced a partnership with the Surrey Scorchers to become the club's new youth academy. As a result, Scorchers head coach Creon Raftopoulos also joined the team as assistant coach.

== Professional career ==
In 2018, Fettes joined Raftopoulos at the Surrey Scorchers in the British Basketball League.

Following the end of 2018–19 season, Jack Fettes was released – he then graduated with a university degree in Strength and Conditioning and now focuses on his personal training business with a substantial following on social media focusing on Mental & Physical Health.
