= Jack Arthur Wood Jr. =

American politician

Jack Arthur Wood Jr. (December 28, 1923 – July 4, 2005) was an American politician. He was a three-term state senator of Idaho, then served two terms as state chairman of Democrats for Ronald Reagan in 1984. He also was county coroner for three terms in Bonneville County, Idaho. He was also a member of the Church of Jesus Christ of Latter-day Saints.

== Early life ==
Wood was born on December 28, 1923, in his grandfather's funeral home in Murray, Utah. After moving to Idaho Falls, Idaho, and attending Idaho Falls High School, he enlisted with the United States Navy. He then briefly returned to Idaho before serving a LDS Mission in Northern California and Oregon; returning 1949. He was shortly married after.
