= Jack Nevin =

American lawyer

- Occupations: lawyer, judge, professor

Jack Nevin is a lawyer, retired Washington superior court judge in Pierce County, Washington, and a visiting professor at Seattle University's School of Law. He was formerly a military lawyer. He is currently a brigadier general in the United States Army Reserves. He is the chief judge of the United States Army Court of Criminal Appeals.

== Education ==
Education
	Bachelor	Washington State University
	MBA	Gonzaga University
	J.D.	Gonzaga University
1996		Air War College
1998		Army War College

== Military career ==
Nevin has been in the US military for over thirty years.

== Legal career ==
Nevin helped newly formed countries set out their own rules for their judiciaries. In January 2012, Nevin was an observer at the military commissions at the Guantanamo Bay detention camp

In 2003, Nevin was chosen by the Washington State Trial Lawyers Association to be Washington State's Judge of the Year. He retired from the Washington Superior Court on December 21, 2020.
