= Jack Asselstine =

Canadian ice hockey player

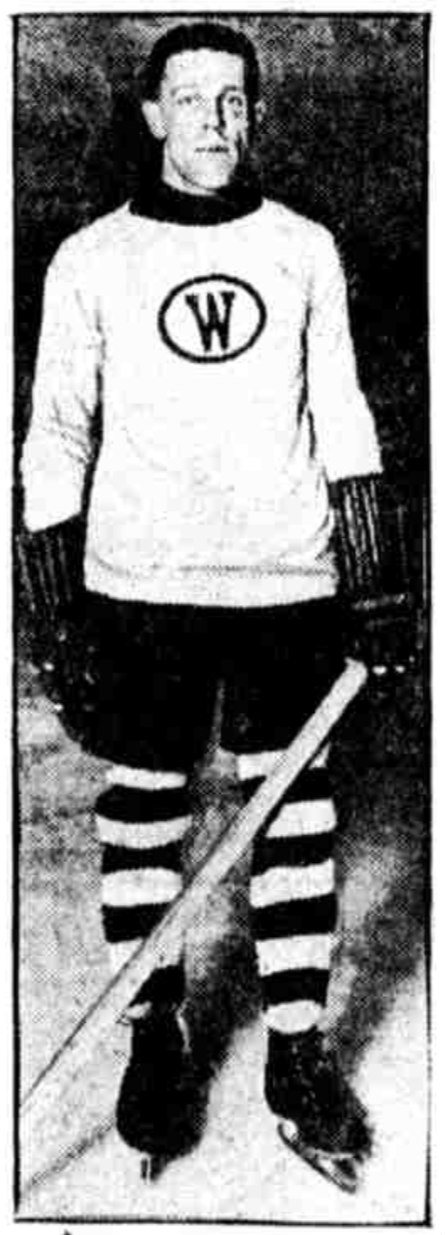
- Asselstine with the Winnipeg Hockey Club c. 1921
- Born: June 2, 1895; Perth, Ontario, Canada
- Died: November 2, 1966 (aged 71)
- Height: 5 ft 11 in (180 cm)
- Weight: 155 lb (70 kg; 11 st 1 lb)
- Position: Right wing
- Shot: Right
- Played for: Saskatoon Sheiks; Vancouver Maroons; Regina Capitals
- Playing career: 1915–1924

John Wesley Asselstine (June 2, 1895 – November 2, 1966) was a Canadian professional ice hockey player. From 1922–1924 he played with the Saskatoon Sheiks and the Regina Capitals of the Western Canada Hockey League and the Vancouver Maroons of the Pacific Coast Hockey Association.
