= Jack Yang =

American computer scientist and biophysicist

- Education: Johns Hopkins University; Purdue University; Harvard Medical School
- Scientific career
- Fields: Computer science Biophysics
- Workplaces: Indiana University; Harvard University

Jack Y. Yang is an American computer scientist and biophysicist. As of 2011, he is the editor-in-chief of the International Journal of Computational Biology and Drug Design.

== Education ==
Yang received his Ph.D. and MS degrees from Purdue University under the supervision of Okan Ersoy (computer engineering) and Albert Overhauser (biophysics), receiving the grade of summa cum laude and the award of Ph.D. thesis of the year in the USA. His post-doctoral training was from Harvard Medical School and Indiana University School of Medicine, and he received training in biostatistics and bioinformatics from Johns Hopkins University, and in computer science from University of Illinois at Urbana-Champaign.

During this period he spent a few months at the CERN Institute. Yang was trained as a combined experimental and computer scientist with teaching, research, engineering, and in field practice in computer science, biomedical engineering and biophysics.

== Career ==
Yang works in engineering and translational medicine, with research interests ranging from cancer homeostasis, computational drug development, high throughput biology, database maintenance and microfluidomics applied to microarray proteomics. He specializes in cancer biology and artificial intelligence.

He is an honorary editor for the International Journal of Functional Informatics and Personalized Medicine and editor-in-chief of the International Journal of Computational Biology and Drug Design, together with partial appointments in Nature and Science, where he contributes regular revisions and comments. He has also been an editor of more than a dozen journals and proceedings books including the Journal of Supercomputing.

He was the general chair of the IEEE 7th International Conference on Bioinformatics and Bioengineering at Harvard Medical School and Co-PI of several grants form the National Science Foundation, Howard Hughes Medical Institute, and the National Institute of Health. He is also a consultant to Interlink Continental Journal of Biological Sciences, MIR labs, and the International Conference on Bioinformatics and Computational Biology.

Yang has published more than 100 peer-reviewed papers and book chapters, especially in BMC Genomics. He is a permanent candidate to the Millennium Technology Prize. Yang completed a university speaking tour in Japan, and met with prime minister Yoshihiko Noda to discuss possible solutions to the Fukushima Daiichi nuclear disaster.
