= Jack Leyfield =

English footballer (1923–2014)

Personal information
- Full name: John George Leyfield
- Date of birth: 5 August 1923
- Place of birth: Handbridge, Cheshire, England
- Date of death: 21 December 2014 (aged 91)
- Place of death: Guildford, Surrey, England
- Position: Wing-half

Senior career*
Years	Team	Apps	(Gls)
1946–1950	Wrexham	34	(1)
1950–1951	Southport	26	(0)
- Winsford United
- * Club domestic league appearances and goals

John George Leyfield (5 August 1923 – 21 December 2014) was an English professional footballer who played as a wing-half. He made appearances in the English Football League with Wrexham and Southport. He also guested during the Second World War with Chester City.
