= Jack Morrell (boxer) =

American boxer (born 1955)

Jack Morrell (born September 16, 1955) was a light welterweight boxer. He ended his career with a record of 19-7-2. He was once a championship hopeful out of Lowell, Massachusetts. He had fought some contenders in Marlon Starling and Kevin Rooney. His son, John Morrell, is the nephew of "Irish" Micky Ward. His name is briefly mentioned in the book Irish Thunder: The Hard Life and Times of Micky Ward.
