= Jack Mulcair =

Canadian ice hockey player

- Born: January 23, 1889; Montreal, Quebec, Canada
- Died: March 19, 1953 (aged 64)
- Height: 5 ft 8 in (173 cm)
- Weight: 135 lb (61 kg; 9 st 9 lb)
- Position: Left wing
- Shot: Left
- Played for: Montreal Shamrocks
- Playing career: 1903–1920

John Mulcair (January 23, 1889 – March 19, 1953) was a Canadian professional ice hockey player. He played with the Montreal Shamrocks of the Canadian Hockey Association and the National Hockey Association.
