= Jack Kirby (English footballer) =

English footballer

Personal information
- Full name: John Kirby
- Date of birth: 30 September 1909
- Place of birth: Overseal, England
- Date of death: 15 June 1960 (aged 50)
- Place of death: Derby, England
- Position: Goalkeeper

Senior career*
Years	Team	Apps	(Gls)
–	Newhall United		
1929–1938	Derby County	173	(0)
1938–1939	Folkestone Town		

Managerial career
- 1938–1939: Folkestone Town (player-manager)
- * Club domestic league appearances and goals

John Kirby (30 September 1909 – 15 June 1960) was an English football goalkeeper who played for Derby County. Kirby is best remembered as the only Derby player touring Germany in 1934 who refused to give the Nazi salute before each game.

== Derby County ==
Kirby joined Derby County from Derbyshire based, Newhall United in April 1929. He debuted for Derby during the 1929–30 season when the club finished second in the First Division.

In 1934 he was part of the Derby side that toured Germany. Kirby defied the German authorities by being the only member of the team to refuse to give the Nazi salute before each of the four games played on the tour. The team had been instructed to give the salute by British diplomats. A photo of Kirby turning his body 90 degrees and being the only Derby player refusing give the Nazi salute was auctioned for £550 in 2012.

Kirby's gesture preceded Stan Cullis being dropped when responding "Count me out", when directed pre-match to give the Nazi salute when England played Germany in Berlin in 1938.

== After Derby ==
Kirby left Derby in August 1938 having made 191 appearances to become player-manager of Folkestone Town. He held that role until August 1939, the month before World War II began. He died aged 50 in 1960.

In 2025, following an appeal which raised £1500, Kirby's grave in Netherseal, Derbyshire was restored from its weathered state.
