= Jack (surname) =

Family name

Jack has been used as a surname, primarily deriving from the Middle English and Older Scottish personal names such as Jak, Jagge and Jakke, in turn derived from pet forms of John, but perhaps in some cases Jack arose in Middle English from the Old French personal name Jacque(s) (i.e. James).

== Frequency ==
The occurrence of Jack as a surname is much less frequent than its use as a male forename. In 1990, in the United States, this surname is shared by about 0.007% of the population, though the geographical distribution of the surname has been broad since at least 1840, at which time there was a modest concentration of Jacks in Pennsylvania. Within the United Kingdom, the surname is considered almost exclusively Scottish. In the late-nineteenth century, the geographic distribution of Jacks in England was also broad, with concentration in North East England, Yorkshire and the Humber, and southern North West England.

== Notable people with this surname ==
- Aaron Jack (born 1975), member of the Kansas House of Representatives
- Adrian Jack (born 1943), British composer
- Alexander Jack (1805–1857), Scottish army officer in the East India Company
- Alister Jack (born 1963), Scottish politician
- Andrew Jack (disambiguation)
- Andy Jack (1920–2004), Scottish footballer
- Annie Jack (née Hayr) (1839–1912), Canadian garden writer
- Archibald Jack (1874–1939), New Zealand-born railway engineer and British Army officer
- Badou Jack (born 1983), Swedish-Gambian boxer
- Barnaby Jack (1977–2013) New Zealander hacker, programmer and computer security expert
- Bob Jack (1876–1943), Scottish football player and manager
- Brandon Jack (born 1994), Australian rules footballer and author, younger brother of Kieren
- Caroline Jack (born 1978), South African field hockey player
- Chris Jack (born 1978), New Zealand rugby union footballer
- Cordel Jack (born 1982), West Indies cricketer
- David Jack (disambiguation), several people
- Denis Jack (born 1941), Scottish footballer
- Donald Jack (1924–2003), Canadian novelist and playwright
- Elaine L. Jack (1928–2025), Canadian church leader, president of the Relief Society of the LDS Church
- Eric Jack (born 1972), American football cornerback
- Felisha Legette-Jack (born 1966), American university basketball coach
- Fritz Jack (1879–1966), German fencer
- Galactus Jack, real name Ben Jack (born 1982), British disc-jockey and producer
- Garry Jack (born 1961), Australian rugby league footballer and coach, father of Kieren and Brendan
- George Jack (architect) (1855–1931), British Arts and Crafts designer and architect
- George W. Jack (1875–1924), United States district judge
- Gilbert Jack (Jachaeus, Jacchaeus) (c. 1578–1628), Scottish philosopher
- Gullah Jack (died 1822), Angolan-American conjurer and slave
- Henry Jack (1917–1978), Scottish mathematician
- Holly Jack, Scottish actress and director
- Homer A. Jack (1916–1993), American Unitarian Universalist clergyman pacifist and social activist
- Hugh Jack (1929–2018), Australian long jumper
- Hulan Jack (1905–1986), Saint Lucian-born New York politician
- Ian Jack (1945–2022), Scottish journalist
- Ian Jack (literary scholar) (1923–2008), British academic
- Isaac Allen Jack (1843–1903), Canadian lawyer and author
- James Jack (disambiguation)
- Janis Graham Jack (born 1946), United States federal judge
- Jarrett Jack (born 1983), American basketball player
- Jill Jack, American singer-songwriter
- Jimmy Jack, Australian screenwriter, film director, actor and producer
- John Jack (1932–1988), Scottish footballer
- Julian Jack (born 1936), New Zealand physiologist
- Keith Jack (born 1988), British actor and singer
- Kelvin Jack (born 1976), Trinidadian football goalkeeper
- Kema Jack (born 1982), international footballer for Papua New Guinea
- Kenneth Jack (1924–2006), Australian watercolour artist
- Kieren Jack (born 1987), Australian rules footballer, older brother of Brendan
- Lowell Jack (1925–2010), historian, city commissioner, mayor and president of chamber of commerce in Manhattan, Kansas
- Mac Jack (1965–2020), South African politician
- Sir Malcolm Jack (born 1946), clerk of the House of Commons of the United Kingdom
- Martin Jack (footballer) (born 1989), Scottish footballer
- Martin Jack (politician), member of the New Hampshire House of Representatives
- Mathias Jack (born 1969), German footballer
- Michael Jack (born 1946), English politician
- Myles Jack (born 1995), American football linebacker
- Nawal El Jack (born 1988), Sudanese sprinter
- Noel Morrison Jack (died c. 1985), Australian ornithologist
- Patrick Churchill Jack (1808–1844), leader in the Republic of Texas
- Raewyn Jack (born 1971), New Zealand rhythmic gymnast
- Richard Jack (1866–1952), Canadian painter
- Richard C. Jack, British animator and filmmaker
- Robert Logan Jack (1845–1921), Australian geologist
- Rodney Jack (born 1972), football player from Saint Vincent and the Grenadines
- Rollo Jack (1902–1994), English footballer
- Ross Jack (born 1959), Scottish football manager
- Sir Roy Jack (1914–1977), New Zealand politician
- Ryan Jack (born 1992), Scottish footballer
- Samuel Jack (1884–?), Scottish footballer
- Samuel S. Jack (1905–1983), American Marine general, Navy Cross recipient
- Sandy Jack (1922–2002), Scottish campaigner and consumer champion
- Simon Jack (born 1971), British business journalist
- Steven Jack (born 1970), South African cricketer
- Stuart Jack (1949–2022), British diplomat, Governor of the Cayman Islands 2005–2009
- Summers Melville Jack (1852–1945), member of the U.S. House of Representatives
- Thomas Jack (athlete) (1881–1961), British track and field athlete
- Thomas Jack (born 1993), Australian DJ
- Walter Jack (1874–1936), Scottish footballer
- William Jack (disambiguation)

== See also ==
- Jacq, surname
- Jacque, given name and surname
- Sumner Dagogo-Jack (born 1930), chairman of the National Electoral Commission of Nigeria, 1994–1998
