= Jacques =

- Pronunciation: French: [ʒɑk] or [ʒak] Quebec French: [ʒɑɔ̯k]
- Gender: Male

Origin
- Origin: Hebrew
- Meaning: "He may/will/shall follow/heed/seize-by-the-heel/watch/guard/protect”, "Supplanter/Assailant", "May God protect" or "May he protect"
- Region of origin: French

Other names
- Related names: Jaques; Jacque; Jacob; Jack; Jake; Jackie; Jacqueline; James; Jaime; Iago, Diego; Tiago, Santiago; Yaqub

The name Jacques, derived from Jacob, is believed to have originated in the northwest Brittany region of France in the Middle Ages, and occurs in variations, such as Jacq, as both a given name and a surname.

== Origins ==
A variant of Jacob, the name Jacq[ues] derives from the Late Latin Iacobus, from the Greek Ἰακώβος Iakóbos or Ἰάκωβος Iákōbos (Septuagintal Greek Ἰακώβ Iakób), from the Hebrew name Jacob (יַעֲקֹב Yaʿaqōḇ). Jacob is strongest associated with the biblical patriarch Jacob.

== As surname ==
=== Early history ===
Robert Jacques, a knight crusader in 1248, was the first documented use of the surname. Returning from the Crusades in the Holy Lands, he may have adopted the surname from Saint Jacques, in reference to James the Greater, one of Jesus's Twelve Apostles, and believed to be the first martyred apostle. Being endowed with this surname was an honor at the time and it is likely that the Church allowed it because of acts during the Crusades. Indeed, at this time, biblical, Christian, or Hebrew names became very popular, and more broadly entered the European lexicon.

Since then, several notables who have borne this surname include: Guillaume, secretary of the Duke and auditor of the account in 1413; Thomas, the Archdeacon of Penthievre, the Prior of Pirmil, the Bishop of Leon in 1478, transferred to Dol in 1482, the ambassador of the duke to the Pope in 1486, who died in 1503, and is interred in his cathedral; Jean, the Canon of Dol and Prior of Lehon; François, Lord of the Ville-Carré, and the Provost Marshal in 1577; Captain of Ploërmel, who prospered in Rennes in 1621; Bernard, a Rennes counsellor in 1653. Several European kings also adopted the name.

The use of surnames was not widespread in most of Europe until the mid-to-late 16th century, and prior usage was largely restricted to the noble class. There are over one hundred noble families related to the surname identified by The Nobility & Gentry of Great Britain & Ireland.

=== Spread of surname to the Britain, with Jack and other variants ===
The use of surnames reached England during the conquest by an army of Norman, Breton, Flemish, and French soldiers under William the Conqueror. The names became anglicised following the conquest. Over the centuries the spelling of the Jack surname has changed and developed as the French language became increasingly associated with high culture and status. Forms of the name appear in the records spelled as Jacques, Jaques, Jack, Jacks, Jackes, Jakes, Jeeks, Jeke, Jeex, Jaquiss, Jaquez, and Jaquis, with further derivates like Jackson; spelling variations sometimes occur even in documents referring to the same person. There are several explanations for this situation. Latin, as a language used by the educated, and the language of the Anglo-Saxons both had a profound impact on the spelling and pronunciation of Norman names in Britain. On the other hand, the Norman language affected the development of English. As the English language developed from its Germanic roots into Middle English (which was influenced by Norman French) we find a period during which spelling was not standardised but roughly followed phonetic pronunciation. During this time names were spelled a variety of ways depending upon local dialects. Thus the surname, as well as the Anglo-Saxon names, were recorded in many different ways.

Norman surnames like Jack are sometimes mistakenly considered French, though Normans (a term derived from Northmen), were of partial Viking origin. In 911, Vikings settled in their namesake region, Normandy, in current day France, where their language merged with that of locals. Throughout this period, England also endured Viking invasions, but the Anglo-Saxons successfully repelled them until 994. When the Danes ruled England, the Saxon royal family lived in Normandy and intermarried with the Duke of Normandy's family. William II, Duke of Normandy, could then claim the English throne when his cousin, Edward the Confessor, the restored Saxon king, died without an heir.

At the Battle of Hastings, William's army defeated their rival, King Harold Godwin, who was killed in the engagement. William could then claim the throne as Harold was elected and not a true member of the royal family. Despite the success of the foreign conquest, English nobles were permitted to retain their land unless they rebelled. Any resisting English elite had their lands confiscated, and some of them fled into exile as a result. William granted lands to his followers and built commanding military strongpoint castles for defence of his realm. By 1086, more than 92% of English nobles were replaced by William's followers. One of these followers is believed to be an ancestor of the surname, Jack.

==== Early notables ====
Historians have studied documents such as the Domesday Book, compiled by William I of England, in search of the first record of the Jack surname, and found it to be of Norman origin, first appearing in Yorkshire where they held a family seat as Lords of the Manor of Nether Silton in the North Riding of the region. At the time of the Doomsday Book in 1086, Nether Silton was recorded as a village with a hall and the tenant-in-chief was the Count of Mortain.

The first recorded spelling of the family name is shown to be that of William Jagge (1216–1272) from Cambridgeshire and known as "The Frenchman"; he appears, dated 1251, in the Chartulary of Ramsey Abbey during the reign of King Henry III, and also is recorded as a witness in the Assize Court Rolls of Cambridgeshire in 1260.

Katherine Jeke of Wikington in Stafford married Robert Farnham, Lord of Querndon, in 1440. The family later acquired estates at Easby Abbey and Elvington. Of this latter branch, Sir Roger Jaques was Lord Mayor of York in 1639, and knighted by King Charles I. Sir John Jacques was also knighted by King Charles I in 1628. The family branched into Middlesex. Mary, daughter of Thomas Jacques of Leeds, married Robert Gosforth of Northumberland in 1818. The present seat of the family is at Easby Abbey.

Before the usage of surnames became common, differentiating between generations also led to 'son of Jack, Jack's son' becoming Jackson, most notably with US President Andrew Jackson of South Carolina. That Jackson family had immigrated from Ireland during the colonial period. Jackson led American forces at the Battle of New Orleans in the War of 1812. Due to favorable weather conditions, and his overall leadership, Britain suffered one of her worst defeats in their overseas colonial history. His fame as a general helped him to become the seventh US president later in his life.

=== People with the surname Jacques ===
- Bob Jacques, rugby league footballer who played in the 1900s
- Brian Jacques (1939–2011), British author and radio host, known primarily for the Redwall series
- Cheryl Jacques (born 1962), American activist
- David Jacques (fl. 2022), British garden historian
- Hattie Jacques (1922–1980), British comedy actress
- Jean-François Jacques (born 1985), Canadian professional hockey player
- Jeph Jacques (born 1980), American webcomic artist
- José Carlos Jacques (born 1945), Brazilian athlete
- Kateřina Jacques (born 1971), Czech politician
- Leslie Innes Jacques (1897–1959), British Army engineers officer
- Martin Jacques (born 1945), British journalist, former editor of Marxism Today
- Martyn Jacques (born 1959), British musician, singer and songwriter, founder of The Tiger Lillies
- Reginald Jacques (1894–1969), English choral and orchestral conductor
- Rémy Jacques (1817–1905), French lawyer and politician.
- Richard Jacques (born 1973), British composer
- Richard Jacques (military officer) (1704–1745), American colonial officer during Father Rale's War
- Victor Jacques British brigadier of the Second World War

== As given name ==
Jacques is the French equivalent of James, both ultimately deriving from the name Jacob. Jacques is from Iacobus, while James is from Iacomus, a variant of Iacobus.

As a first name, Jacques is often semi-phonetically converted in English to Jacob, Jake (from Jacob), or Jack. Jack, from Jankin, is usually a diminutive of John but can also be used as a short form for many names derived from Jacob like Jacques.

In French, Jacky is commonly used as a nickname for Jacques. In Dutch, Jack is a pet form of Jacob or Jacobus along with the other nicknames Sjaak, Sjaakie, and Jaak. In Swedish, it is Jacke for Jacob or Jakob, and in German it is Jackel or Jockel for Jakob.

In French, Jacques is a frequent component of compound given names, especially the common Jean-Jacques.

=== People with the given name Jacques ===
- Jacques I (1689–1751), Prince of Monaco
- Jacques Abady (1872–1964), British lawyer
- Jacques Anquetil (1934–1987), French cyclist
- Jacques Arnold (born 1947), English politician and MP for Gravesham (1987–1997)
- Jacques P. Barber, American clinical psychologist and psychotherapy researcher
- Jacques Barzun (1907–2012), French-born American historian
- Jacques Beckers (1934–2021), Dutch-born American astrophysicist
- Jacques Bessan (born 1993), Beninese footballer
- Jacques Brel (1929–1978), Belgian singer and songwriter
- Jacques Breyer (1922–1996), French writer and esotericist
- Jacques Brinkman (born 1966), Dutch field hockey player and coach
- Jacques-Yves Cousteau (1910–1997), French underwater explorer
- Jacques Cartier (1491–1557), French explorer
- Jacques Chapiro (1887–1972), painter
- Jacques Chirac (1932–2019), French politician
- Jacques Conceição (born 1989), Angolan-Portuguese basketball player
- Jacques D'Amours (born 1956/57), Canadian businessman
- Jacques Delors (1925–2023), French politician
- Jacques de Molay (c. 1243–1314), last Grand Master of the Knights Templar
- Jacques Deray (1929–2003), French film director and screenwriter
- Jacques Derrida (1930–2004), Algerian-born French philosopher
- Jacques du Toit (cricketer) (born 1980), South African-born cricketer
- Jacques du Toit (rugby union) (born 1993), South African-born rugby union player
- Jacques Dutronc (born 1943), French singer and actor
- Jacques Ellul (1912–1994), French philosopher
- Jacques Erwin (1908–1957), French actor
- Jacques Faty (born 1984), Senegalese footballer
- Jacques Feyder (1885–1948), Belgian film director
- Jacques Follorou (born 1968), French journalist
- Jacques Frémontier (born surname Friedman; 1930–2020), French journalist and television producer
- Jacques Gaillot (1935–2023), French social activist and Roman Catholic Bishop
- Jacques Goudchaux (born 1963), French racing driver
- Jacques Grimaldi, Hereditary Prince of Monaco, Marquis de Baux (born 2014), heir to the Monegasque throne
- Jacques Hanegraaf (born 1960), Dutch cyclist
- Jacques Ibert (1880–1962), French composer of classical music
- Jacques Kallis (born 1975), South African cricketer
- Jacques La Degaillerie (born 1940), French fencer
- Jacques Lacan (1901–1981), French psychiatrist and psychoanalyst
- Jacques Landry (born 1969), Canadian cyclist
- Jacques le Gris (1330–1386) Squire/Knight who was killed in a judicial duel in France after he was accused of assaulting the wife of his former friend, Jean de Carrouges.
- Jacques Loeb (1859–1924), German-born American physiologist and biologist
- Jacques-Louis David (1748–1825), French neo-classical painter
- Jacques Maritain (1882–1973), French Catholic philosopher
- Jacques Marquette (1637–1675), French explorer, led first European expedition to the northern Mississippi River
- Jacques Massu (1908–2002), French general
- Jacques Mazoin (1929–2020), French rugby union player and coach
- Jacques Monod (1910–1976), French biologist and Nobel Prize recipient
- Jacques Oberti (born 1960), French politician
- Jacques Ochs (1883–1971), Belgian Olympic champion épée fencer
- Jacques Offenbach (1819–1880), German born French composer, notable for composing the "Can Can"
- Jacques Onana (born 1993), Cameroonian footballer
- Jacques Parizeau (1930–2015), Premier of Québec
- Jacques Pépin (born 1935), French chef
- Jacques Pilet (born 1943), Swiss journalist
- Jacques Plante (1929–1986), Canadian professional ice hockey goaltender
- Jacques Prévert (1900–1977), French poet and screenwriter
- Jacques Pucheran (1817–1894), French zoologist
- Jacques Puisais (1927–2020), French oenologist
- Jacques Ramsay, Canadian politician
- Jacques Rancière (born 1940), French philosopher
- Jacques Robert (film director) (1890–1928), Swiss silent actor and film director in the 1910s and 1920s
- Jacques Riparelli (born 1983), Cameroonian-born Italian athlete
- Jacques Rit (born 1949), Monegasque politician
- Jacques Rivette (1928–2016), French filmmaker
- Jacques Rogge (1942–2021), Belgian sports administrator, president of the International Olympic Committee
- Jacques Rougeau (born 1960), Canadian professional wrestler
- Jacques Rudolph (born 1981), South African cricketer
- Jacques Stas (born 1969), Belgian basketball coach and former player
- Jacques Stroweis, special effects artist
- Jacques Sylla (1946–2009), Malagasy politician, former Prime Minister of Madagascar
- Jacques Tati (1907–1982), French filmmaker
- Jacques Urbain, Belgian scientist
- Jacques Villeneuve (born 1971), Canadian racing driver
- Jacques Webster (born 1991), known as Travis Scott, American rapper
- Jacques Yoko (born 1972), French volleyball player
- Jacques Zabor (1941–2007), French actor
- Jacques Zon (1872–1932), Dutch painter

==== Fictional characters ====
- Dr. Jacques von Hämsterviel, an alien villain in the Lilo & Stitch franchise
- Jacques Snicket, a character in the A Series of Unfortunate Events novels
- Inspector Jacques Clouseau, the detective from The Pink Panther series

== See also ==
- Jack (given name)
- Jack (surname)
- Jacqueline (given name)
- Jaques, name list
- Jean-Jacques, name list
