= Jaques =

Jaques is a given name and surname, a variant of Jacques.

== People with the given name Jaques ==
- Jaques Bagratuni (1879-1943), Armenian prince
- Jaques Bisan (b. 1993) Beninese footballer
- Jaques Étienne Gay (1786-1864) Swiss-French botanist
- Jaques Lazier (1971-) American racing driver
- Jaques Morelenbaum (1954-) Brazilian musician
- Jaques-Louis Reverdin (1842-1929) Swiss surgeon
- Jaques Sterne (1695-1759) English cleric and politician
- Jaques Wagner (1951-) Brazilian politician
- Jaques le Vinier (c 1240-60) French troubadour

=== Fictional characters ===
- Jaques in Shakespeare's As You Like It

== People with the surname Jaques ==
- Arthur Jaques (1888–1915), English cricketer
- Bob Jaques (born 1953), Canadian-American animation director
- Elliott Jaques, Canadian psychologist
- Faith Jaques (1923–1997), British artist
- Francis Lee Jaques, American wildlife artist
- Harold Vivian Jaques (1882–1952), Australian lawyer and politician.
- Hattie Jacques (1922–1980), English comedy actress (born Josephine Edwina Jaques)
- Rev John Jaques (priest) (1728–1800), British clergyman who became prebendary of Lincoln Cathedral
- John Jaques (Mormon), American Latter Day Saint hymnwriter, missionary, and historian
- Jon Jaques, American-Israeli assistant men's basketball, played for Ironi Ashkelon in Israel
- Peter Jaques (1919–2013), English cricketer
- Phil Jaques, Australian cricketer
- Robin Jacques (1920–1995), English illustrator (born Robin Jaques)
- Émile Jaques-Dalcroze, founder of Dalcroze Eurhythmics
- Sophie Jaques (born 2000), Canadian ice hockey player
- Victor Jaques (1896–1955), British army officer and lawyer

== Other uses ==
- Jaques, Illinois, an unincorporated community in the U.S.A
- Jaques Nunatak, a glacial mountain in Antarctica

== See also ==
- Jaques of London, a British game manufacturing company
- Jacques, given name and surname
- Jaquez, surname
