= Jacq =

Jacq is a surname.

- Angèle Jacq (1937–2021), Breton writer
- Christian Jacq (born 1947), French author and Egyptologist
- Éliane Jacq (1948–2011), French athlete
- Grégoire Jacq (born 1992), French tennis player
- Marie Jacq (1919–2014), French politician
- Peter Le Jacq (born 1954), Maryknoll priest

== See also ==
- Jacq van den Berg (1916–?), Netherlands Olympic sailor
- Jacq Firmin Vogelaar
- Jacq., taxonomic author abbreviation of Nikolaus Joseph von Jacquin(1727–1817), Dutch-born scientist
- J.Jacq., taxonomic author abbreviation of Joseph Franz von Jacquin (1766–1839), Austrian scientist
- Jack (surname)
- Jacque, given name and surname
- Jacques, given name and surname
