= John Jaques =

John Jaques may refer to:

- John Jaques (clergyman), 18th-century clergyman of the Church of England
- John Jaques (Mormon), 19th century Latter Day Saint hymnwriter, missionary, and historian
- John Jaques, of Jaques of London
