= Martin Jack =

Martin Jack may refer to:

- Martin Jack (footballer)
- Martin Jack (politician)
