= Jacques (disambiguation) =

Jacques is a French masculine given name and surname.

Jacques may also refer to:

- Jacques (band), a British alternative rock band
- Jacques (album), an album by Marc Almond
- "Jacques" (song), a song by Jax Jones and Tove Lo
- Jacques (novel), an 1833 novel by George Sand
- Jaques (As You Like It), a character in As You Like It by William Shakespeare

== See also ==
- Jacque (disambiguation)
- Jacquez (disambiguation)
- Jacquerie, peasant uprisings via jacque, a term for a padded jacket and thus the wearer of it
