= Honolulu Museum of Art =

Art museum in Honolulu, Hawaii

The Honolulu Museum of Art

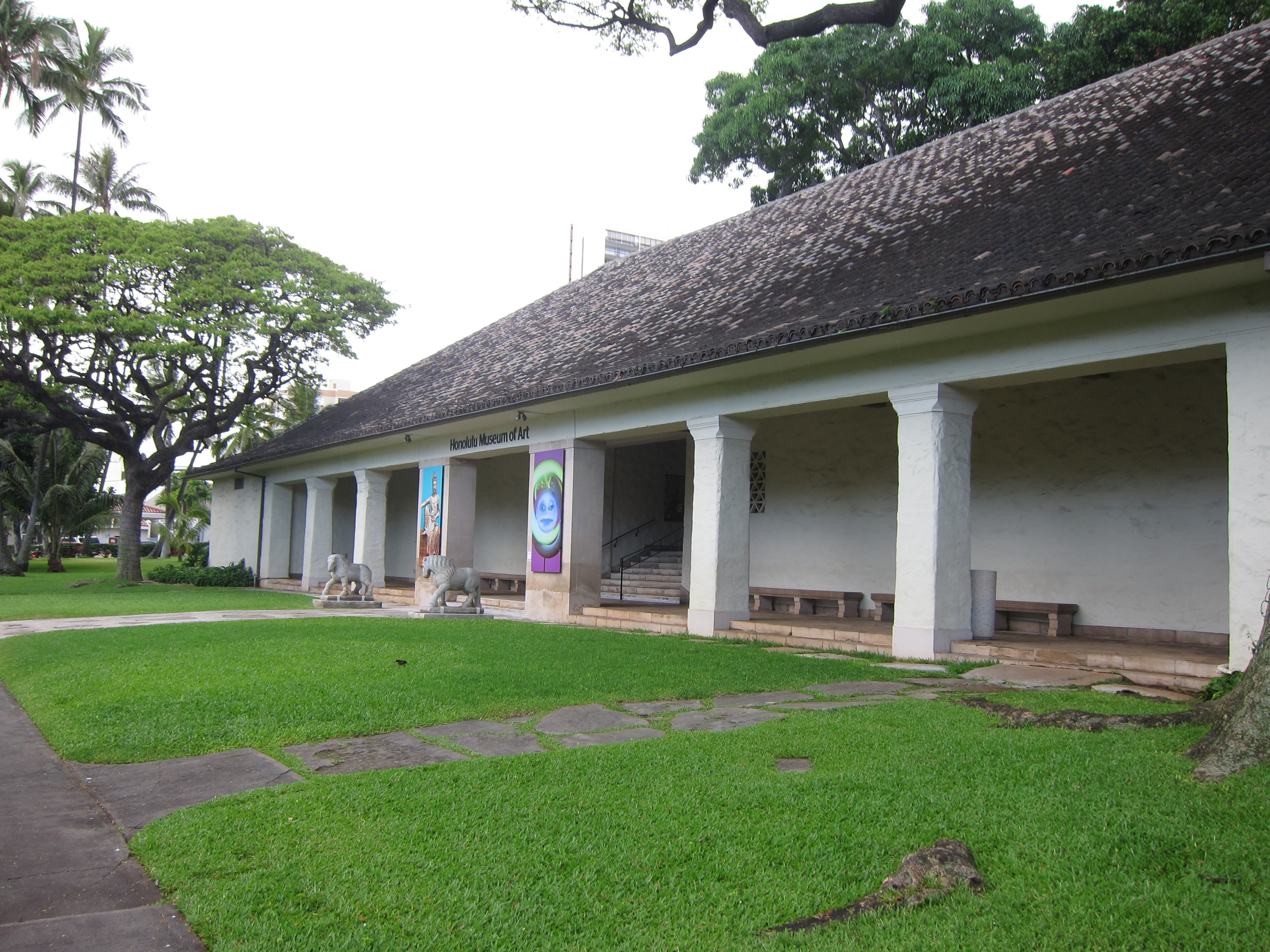
- Established: 1922
- Location: 900 South Beretania Street (between Ward and Victoria Streets), Honolulu, Hawaii
- Director: Penni Hall (interim)
- Website: honolulumuseum.org
- Honolulu Academy of Arts
- U.S. National Register of Historic Places
- Location within Hawaii
- Location: 900 S. Beretania St., Honolulu, Hawaii
- Coordinates: 21°18′14″N 157°50′55″W
- Built: 1927
- Architect: Bertram Goodhue
- Architectural style: Hawaiian
- NRHP reference No.: 72000415
- Added to NRHP: March 25, 1972

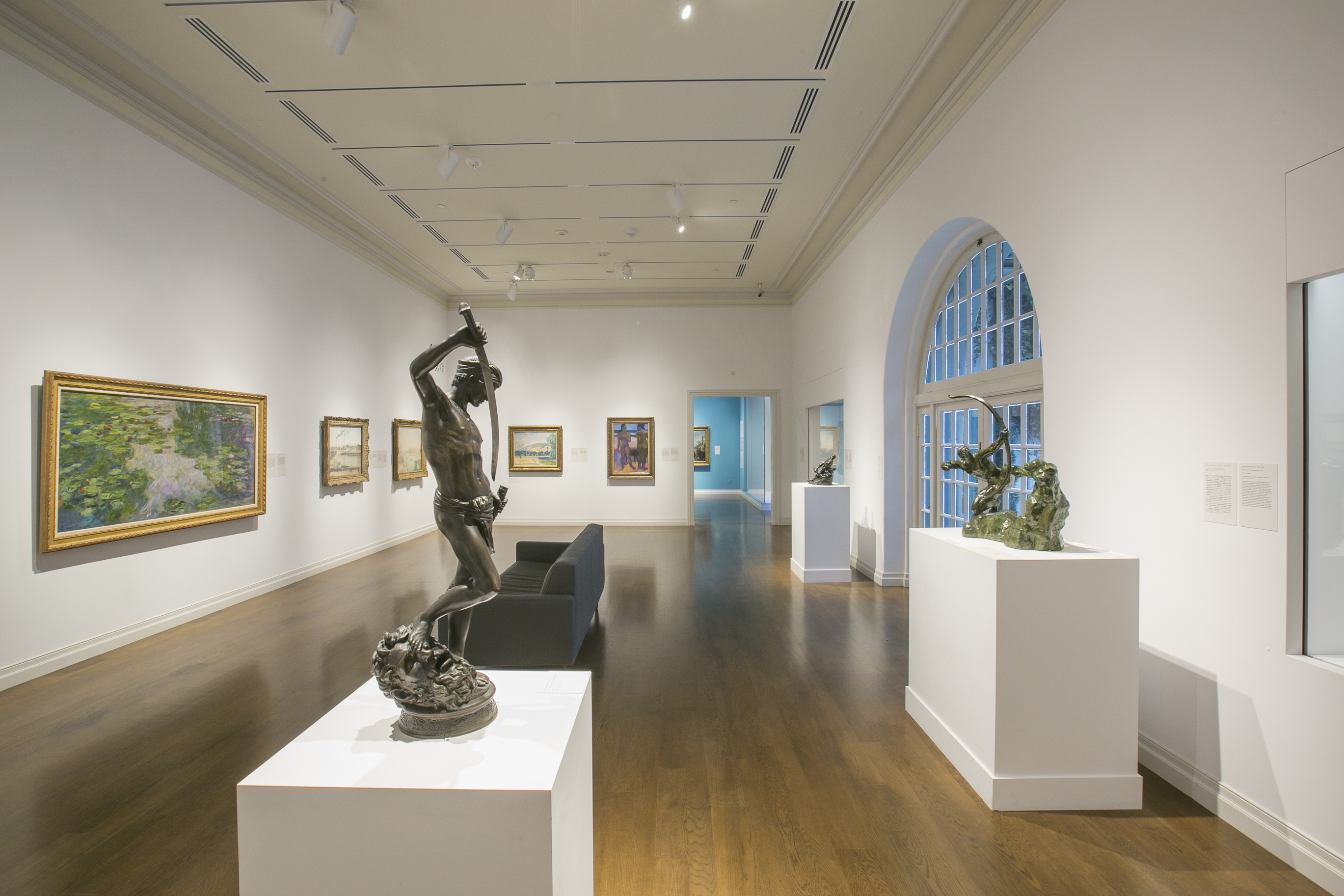
HoMA's Impressionism gallery

The Honolulu Museum of Art (formerly the Honolulu Academy of Arts) is an art museum in Honolulu, Hawaiʻi. The museum is the largest of its kind in the state, and was founded in 1922 by Anna Rice Cooke. It has one of the largest collections of Asian and Pan-Pacific art in the United States, and since its official opening on April 8, 1927, its collections have grown to more than 55,000 works of art.

== Description ==
J. Carter Brown, director of the National Gallery of Art from 1969 to 1992, called the Honolulu Museum of Art "the finest small museum in the United States". In addition to an internationally renowned permanent collection, the museum houses innovative exhibitions, an art school, an independent art house theatre, a café, and a museum shop. In 2011, The Contemporary Museum gave its assets and collection to the Honolulu Academy of Arts; in 2012, the combined museum changed its name to the Honolulu Museum of Art.

The museum is accredited by the American Alliance of Museums and is registered as a National and State Historical site. In 1990, the Honolulu Museum of Art School opened to expand the program of studio art classes and workshops. In 2001, the Henry R. Luce Pavilion Complex opened with the Honolulu Museum of Art Café, Museum Shop, and Henry R. Luce Wing, with 8,000 square feet (740 m^{2}) of gallery space.

=== Collections and holdings ===
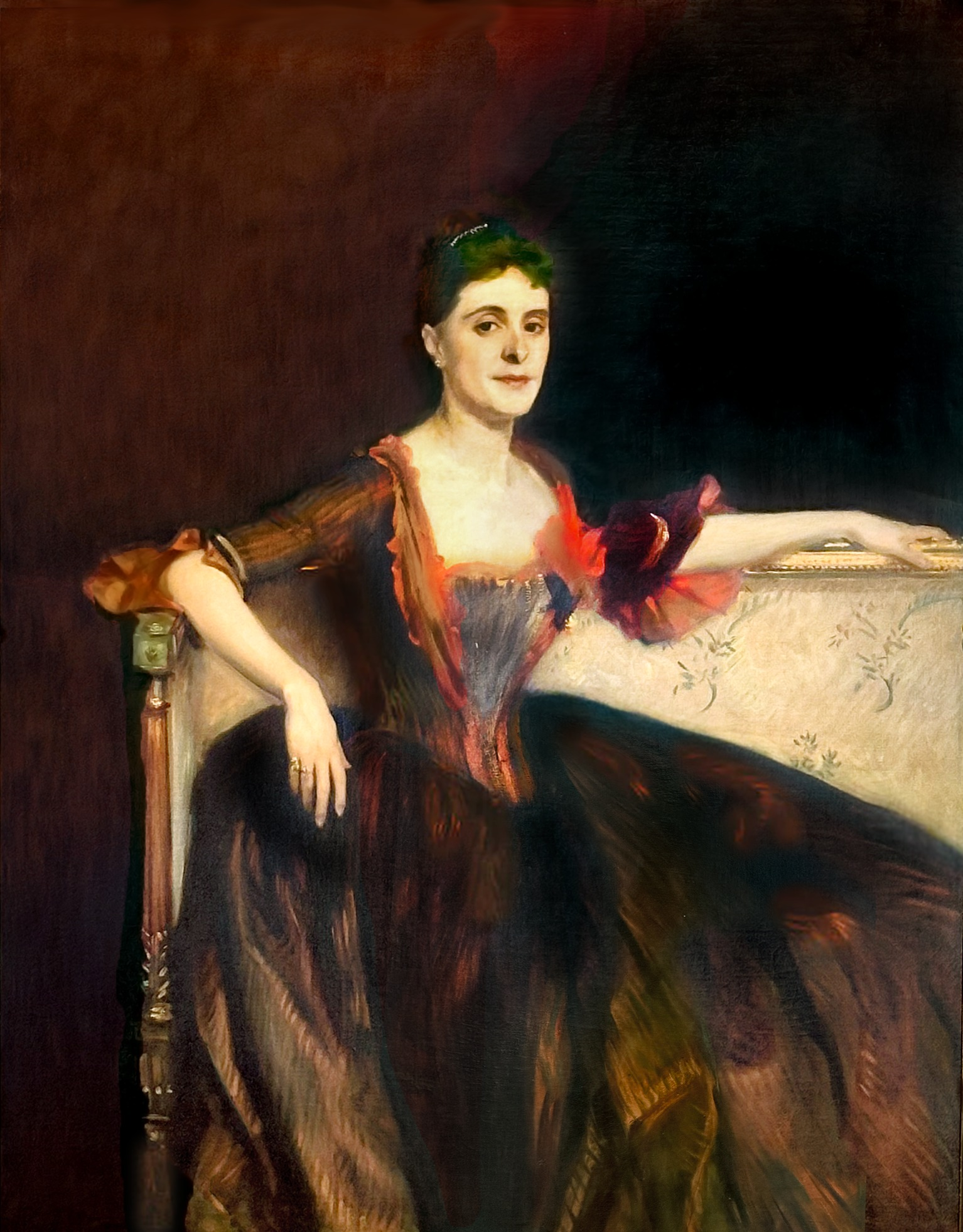
Mrs. Thomas Lincoln Manson Jr (Mary Groot) 1890, by John Singer Sargent. Oil on canvas (56.06" x 44.25")

The Honolulu Museum of Art has a large collection of Asian art, especially Japanese and Chinese works. The Asian art collection includes more than 20,000 works of art, with galleries dedicated to Japan, China, Korea, India, Southeast Asia, Indonesia, and the Philippines. The collection is especially strong in Chinese and Japanese paintings, Korean ceramics, Buddhist and Shinto sculpture, South and Southeast Asian sculpture and decorative arts, and textiles from across Asia. The crown jewel of the Asian art collection is the James A. Michener Collection of more than 10,000 Japanese ukiyo-e woodblock prints, the third-largest collection of its kind in the United States.

Major collections include the Samuel H. Kress collection of Italian Renaissance paintings, American and European paintings and decorative arts, art of Africa, Oceania, and the Americas, textiles, contemporary art, and a graphics collection of over 23,000 works on paper. The museum's European and American collection of paintings, sculptures, decorative arts, textiles, and more than 15,000 works on paper range from the Renaissance to the present. Highlights are major Impressionist, Post-Impressionist and early modernist paintings by Georges Braque, Paul Gauguin, Vincent van Gogh, Fernand Léger, Henri Matisse, Amedeo Modigliani, Claude Monet, Pablo Picasso, and James McNeill Whistler. Significant works of art since the 20th century include paintings and sculptures by Lee Bontecou, Alexander Calder, Leon Golub, Philip Guston, Yan Pei Ming, Isamu Noguchi, Nam June Paik, John Singer Sargent, and David Smith.

The Department of European and American Art has paintings by Josef Albers, Francis Bacon, Edward Mitchell Bannister, Romare Bearden, Jean-Baptiste Belin, Bernardino di Betti (called Pinturicchio), Abraham van Beyeren, Albert Bierstadt, Carlo Bonavia, Pierre Bonnard, François Boucher, Aelbrecht Bouts, Mary Cassatt, Paul Cézanne, Giorgio de Chirico, Frederic Edwin Church, Jacopo di Cione, Edwaert Colyer, John Singleton Copley, Piero di Cosimo, Gustave Courbet, Carlo Crivelli, Jasper Francis Cropsey, Henri-Edmond Cross, Stuart Davis, Edgar Degas, Eugène Delacroix, Robert Delaunay, Richard Diebenkorn, Arthur Dove, Thomas Eakins, Henri Fantin-Latour, Helen Frankenthaler, Bartolo di Fredi, Jan van Goyen, Francesco Granacci, Childe Hassam, Hans Hofmann, Pieter de Hooch, Adélaïde Labille-Guiard, Philip Guston, William Harnett, George Inness, Alex Katz, Paul Klee, Nicolas de Largillière, Sir Thomas Lawrence, Morris Louis, Maximilien Luce, Alessandro Magnasco, Robert Mangold, the Master of 1518, Pierre Mignard, Claude Monet, Thomas Moran, Giovanni Battista Moroni, Grandma Moses, Robert Motherwell, Alice Neel, Kenneth Noland, Georgia O'Keeffe, Amédée Ozenfant, Charles Willson Peale, James Peale, Camille Pissarro, Fairfield Porter, Robert Priseman, Robert Rauschenberg, Odilon Redon, Diego Rivera, George Romney, Francesco de' Rossi (called Il Salviati), Carlo Saraceni, Gino Severini, Frank Stella, Gilbert Stuart, Thomas Sully, Yves Tanguy, Jan Philips van Thielen, Giovanni Domenico Tiepolo, Bartolomeo Vivarini, Maurice de Vlaminck, and William Guy Wall.

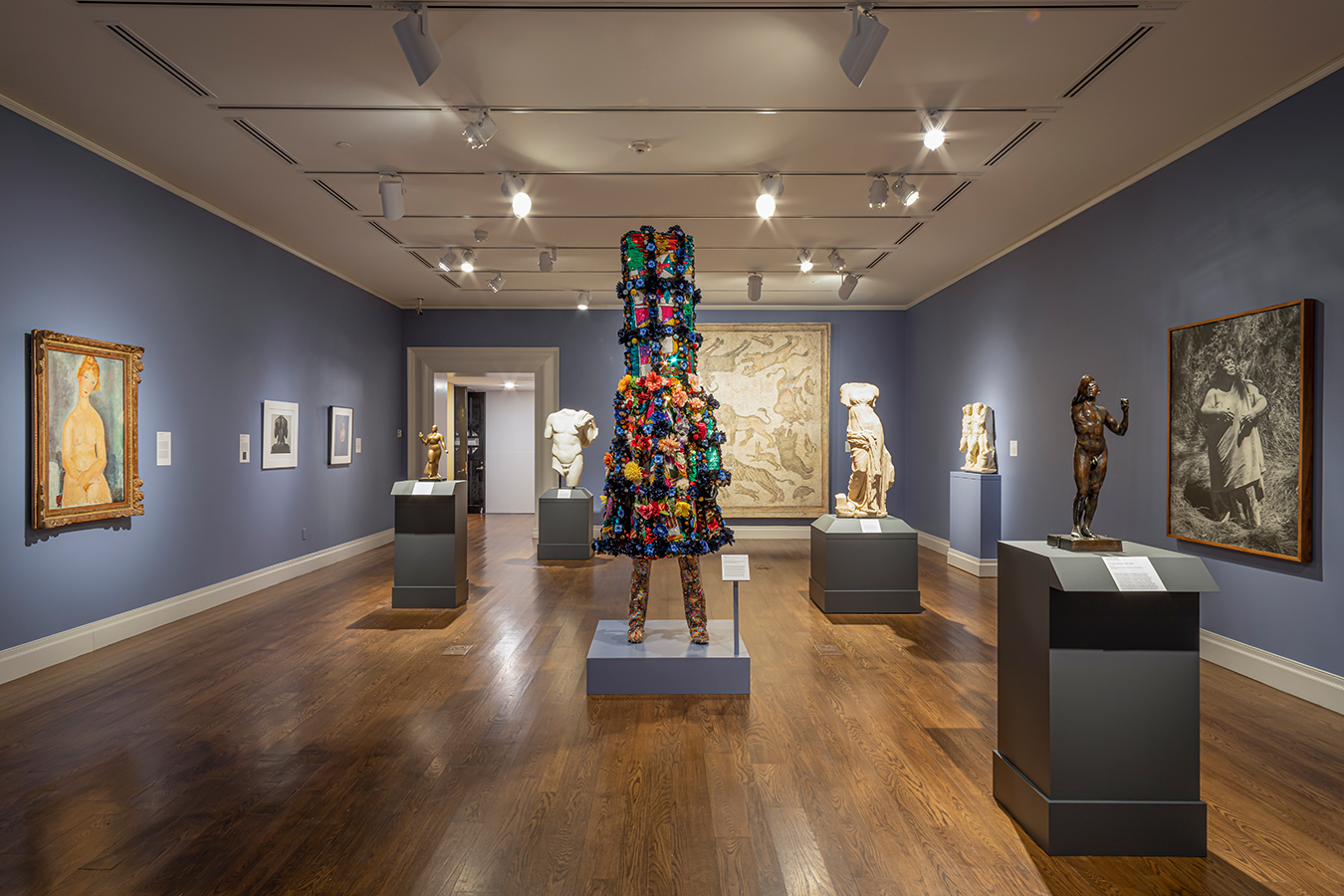
Gallery installation at the Honolulu Museum of Art titled "In Human Terms"

The collection also includes three-dimensional works by Alexander Archipenko, Robert Arneson, Leonard Baskin, Lee Bontecou, Émile Antoine Bourdelle, Nick Cave, Dale Chihuly, John Talbott Donoghue, Jacob Epstein, David Hockney, Donald Judd, Jun Kaneko, Gaston Lachaise, Wilhelm Lehmbruck, Roy Lichtenstein, Jacques Lipschitz, Aristide Maillol, John McCracken, Claude Michel (called Clodion), Henry Moore, Elie Nadelman, George Nakashima, Louise Nevelson, Hiram Powers, Pierre-Auguste Renoir, George Rickey, Auguste Rodin, James Rosati, Augustus Saint-Gaudens, Lucas Samaras, George Segal, Mark di Suvero, Tom Wesselmann, and Jack Zajac. The permanent collection is presented in 32 galleries and six courtyards.

The museum also carries works by Volcano School painter Charles Furneaux.

The museum traces the history of art in Hawaiʻi, with a gallery dedicated to Hawaiian traditional arts, art by Hawaiʻi artists, and art of Hawaiʻi.

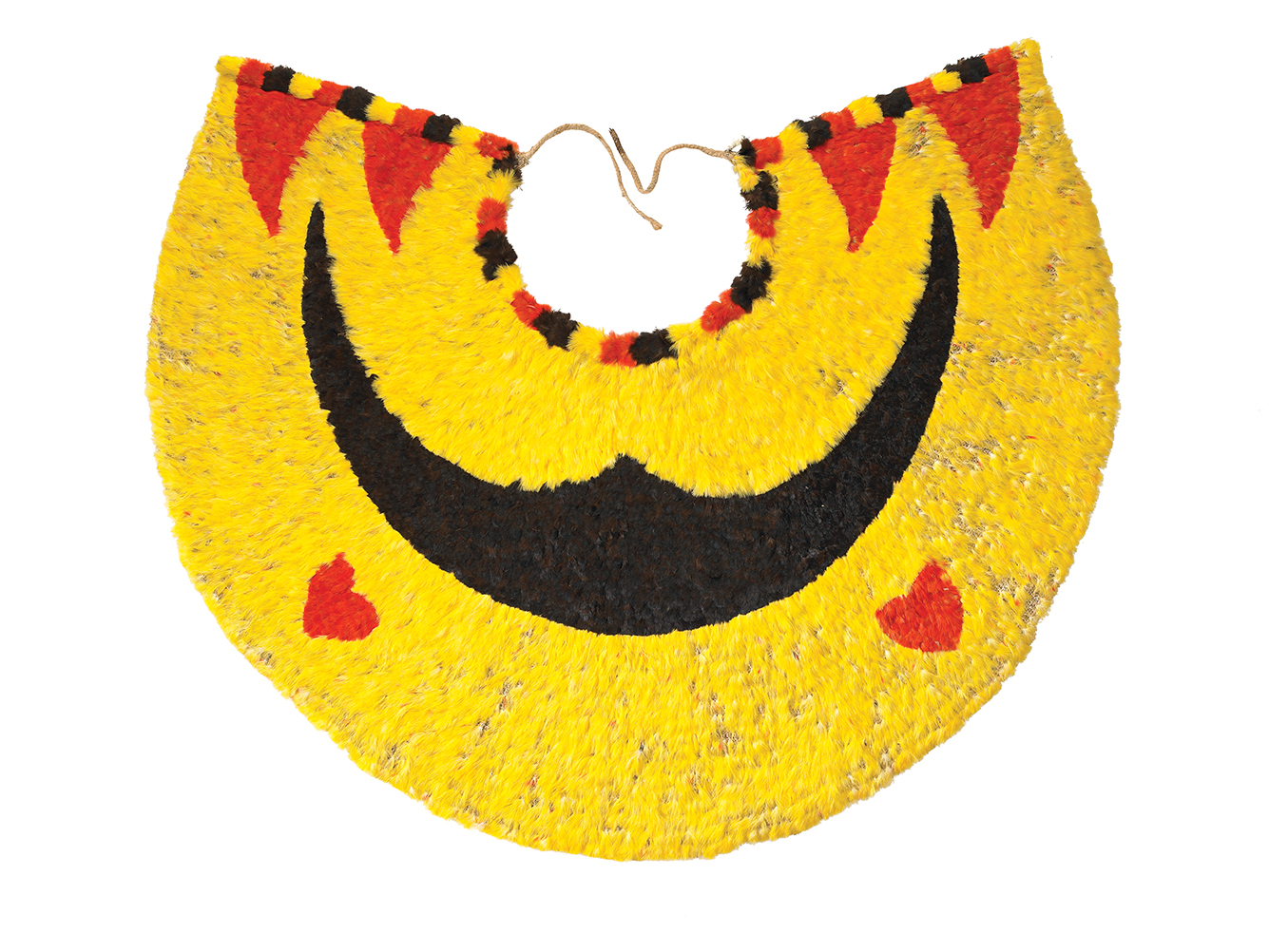
Ahu 'ula (feather cape), late 18th-early 19th century. 25 × 30 1/2 in. Feathers, ʻōʻō feathers (Moho spp.), 'i'iwi feathers (Vestiaria coccinea), olonā bark (Touchardia latifolia). Gift of Mrs. Andrew I. McKee, 1964 (3306.1)

The permanent collection is presented in 32 galleries and six courtyards.

=== Admission ===
The Honolulu Museum of Art occupies 3.2 acres (13,000 m^{2}) near downtown Honolulu. It is open to the public Wednesday through Sunday. Admission is free to members, children 18 and under, and for some events; otherwise a fee is charged. Complimentary admission is offered to Hawaiʻi residents on the third Sunday of the month from 10AM until 6PM. Guided tours are offered several times daily.

=== Hours ===
The museum is open Wednesday, Thursday, Saturday, and Sunday 10AM-6PM, and Friday 10AM-9PM. It is closed Monday and Tuesday.

=== Doris Duke Theatre ===
The Doris Duke Theatre at the museum seats 280. It hosts movies, concerts, lectures, and presentations.

=== Robert Allerton Art Library ===
In 1927, the Research Library opened with 500 books. In 1955, it was expanded and named for Robert Allerton. The collection includes 45,000 books and periodicals, biographical files on artists, and auction catalogues dating to the beginning of the 20th century. The library is a non-circulating research facility with a reading room open to the public.

=== Honolulu Museum of Art School ===
Education has been at the core of the Honolulu Museum of Art's mission since it opened. The museum serves more than 40,000 children and adults annually through free school tours, classes and workshops, outreach programs, activity-filled free museum days, free lectures, and other special programming.

The Honolulu Museum of Art School (formerly the Academy Art Center at Linekona) opened in 1990 and serves thousands of children and adults each year.

=== Shangri La: Doris Duke Foundation for Islamic Art ===
Shangri La is a museum for learning about the global culture of Islamic art and design through innovative exhibitions, educational initiatives, public programs, and community partnerships. Through a partnership with the Honolulu Museum of Art (HoMA), visitors may tour Shangri La. Reservations are required.

Doris Duke built Shangri La with the help of American architect Marion Sims Wyeth. Duke's collection of Islamic art was assembled over 60 years.

== History ==
Anna Rice Cooke, a daughter of New England missionaries and the Honolulu Museum of Art's founder, said in her dedication statement at the museum's opening on April 8, 1927:

That our children of many nationalities and races, born far from the centers of art, may receive an intimation of their own cultural legacy and wake to the ideals embodied in the arts of their neighbors ... that Hawaiians, Americans, Chinese, Japanese, Koreans, Filipinos, Northern Europeans and all other people living here, contacting through the channel of art those deep intuitions common to all, may perceive a foundation on which a new culture enriched by the old strains may be built in the islands.

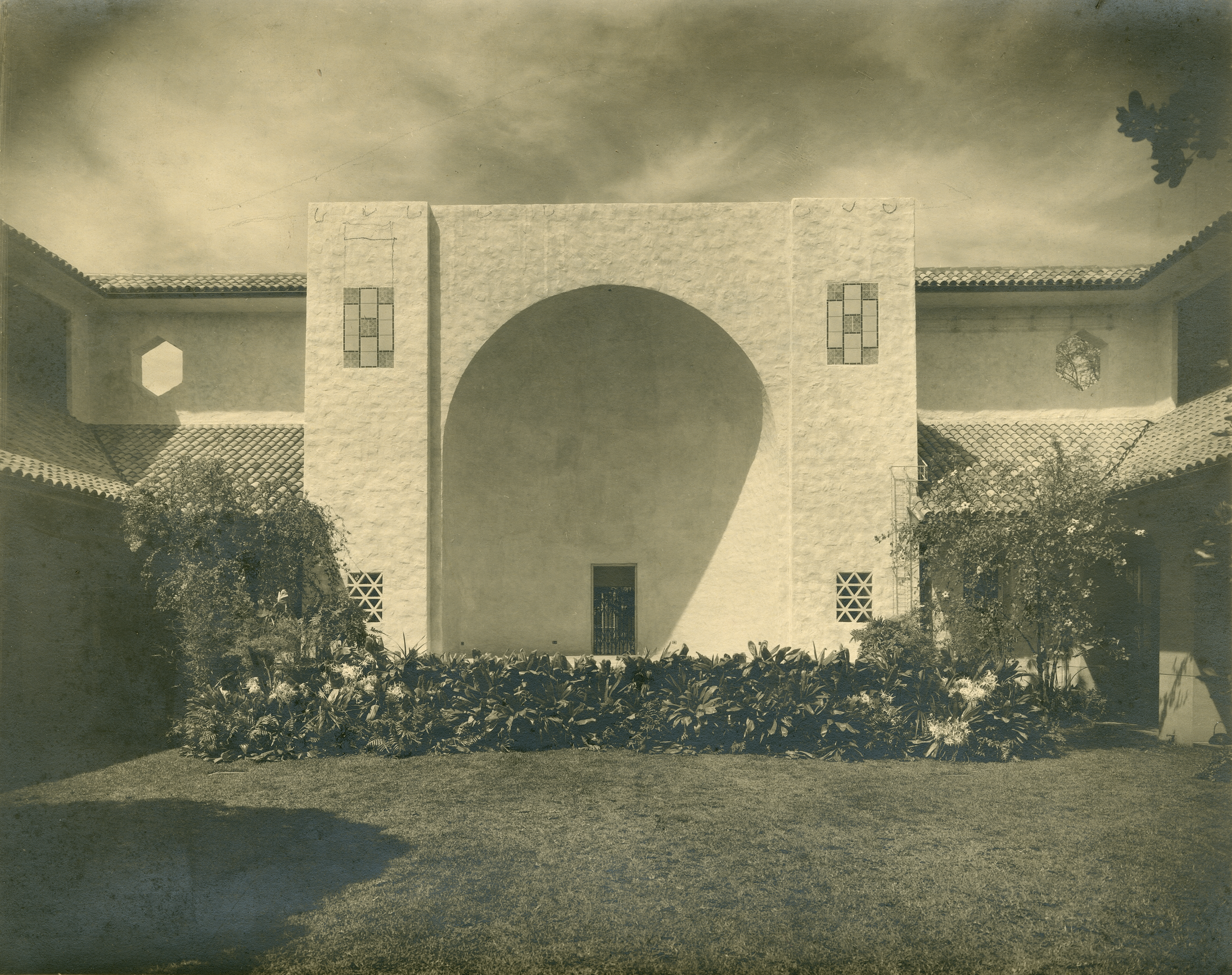
Courtyard at the Honolulu Museum of Art. Photograph from the National Gallery of Art Library.

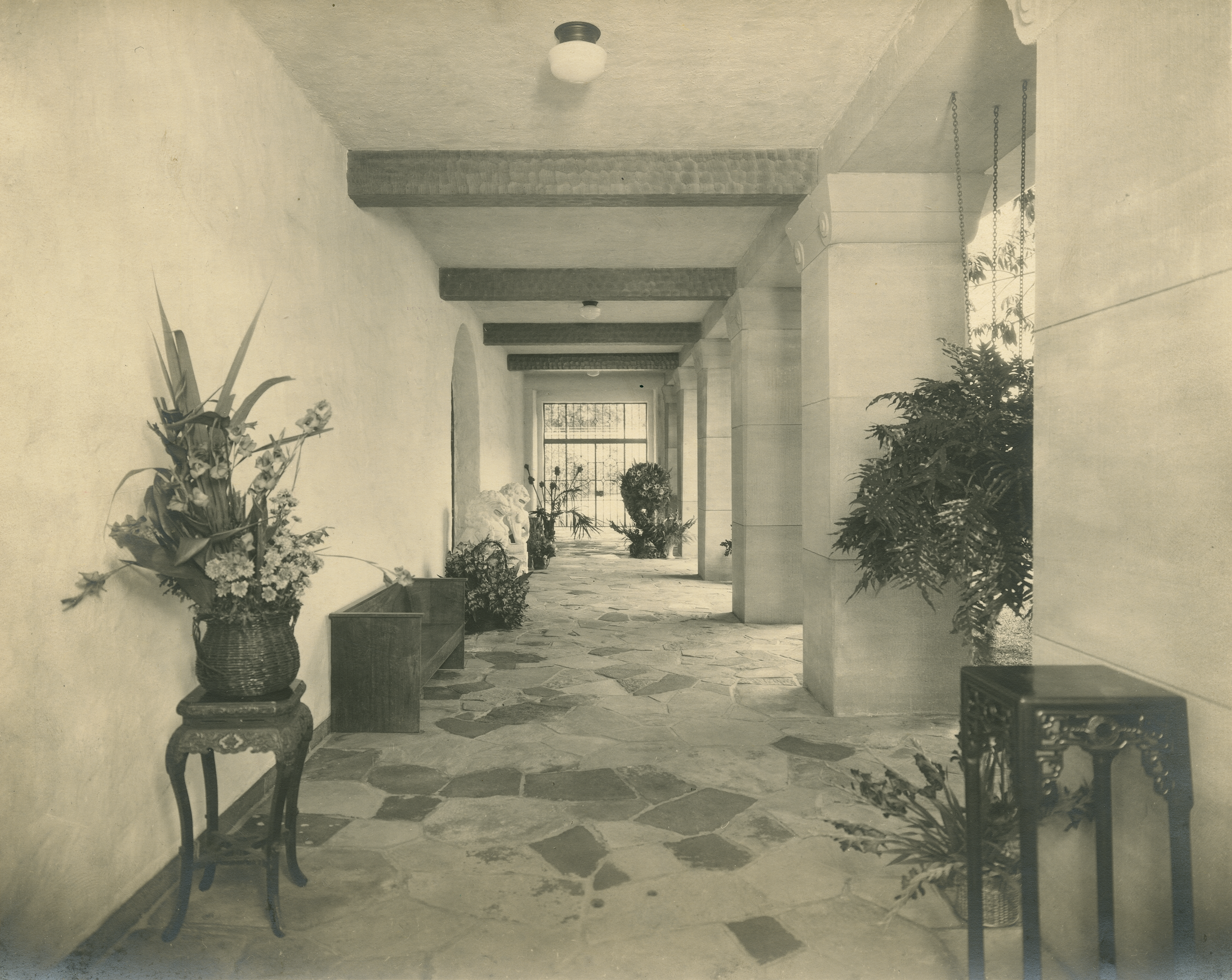
Passageway at the Honolulu Museum of Art. Photograph from the National Gallery of Art Library.

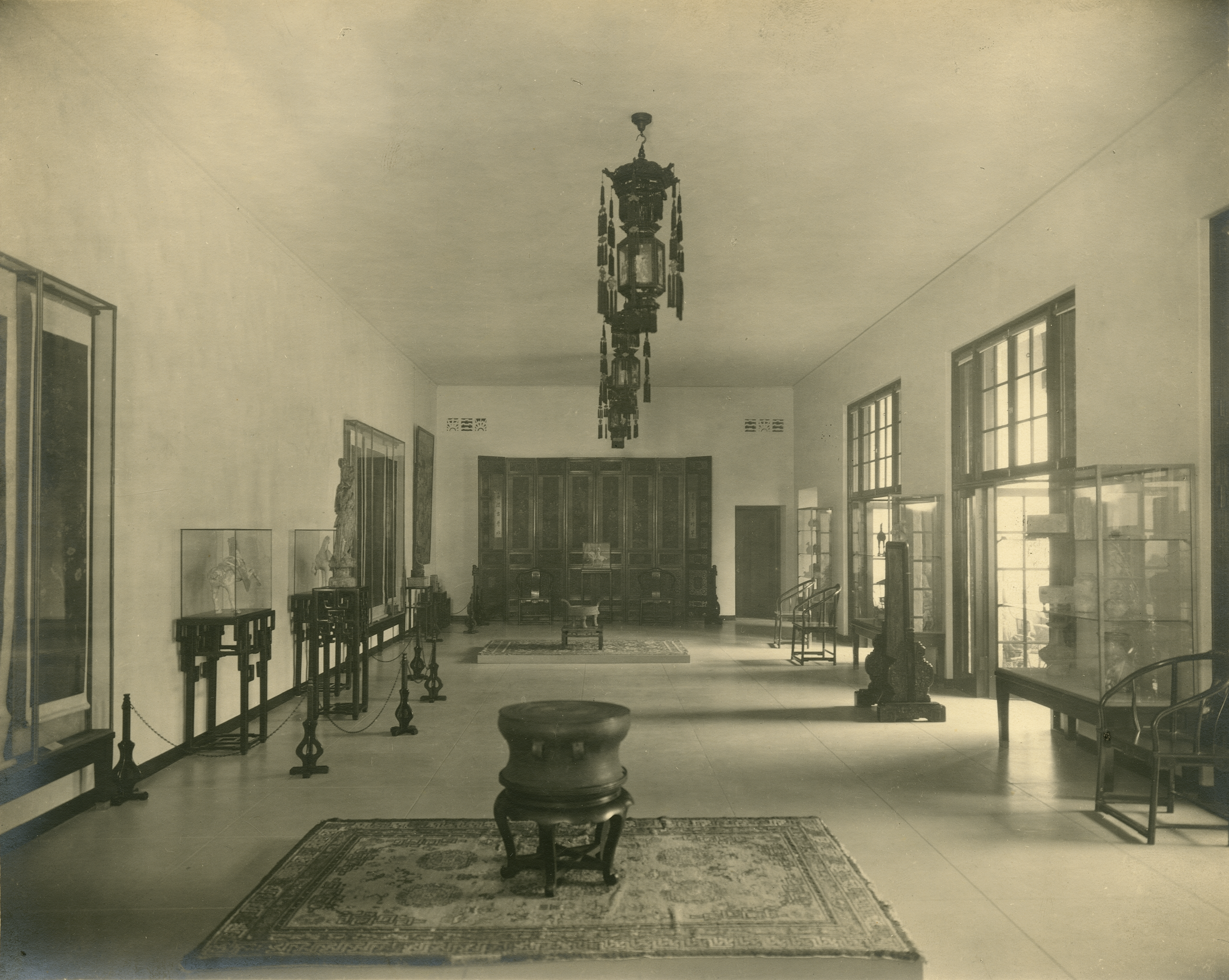
Gallery at the Honolulu Museum of Art. Photograph from the National Gallery of Art Library.

Born on Oʻahu in 1853, Cooke grew up on Kauaʻi island in a home that appreciated the arts. In 1874, she married Charles Montague Cooke, and the two eventually settled in Honolulu. In 1882, they built a home on Beretania Street, across from Thomas Square. As Cooke's career prospered, they gathered their private art collection. First were "parlor pieces" for their home. She frequented the shop of furniture maker Yeun Kwock Fong Inn, who often had ceramics and textile pieces sent from his brother in China.

The Cookes' art collection outgrew their home and the homes of their children. In 1920, she and her daughter Alice (Mrs. Phillip Spalding), her daughter-in-law Dagmar (Mrs. Richard Cooke), and Catharine E. B. Cox (Mrs. Isaac Cox), an art and drama teacher, began to catalogue and research the collection with the intent to display the items in a museum. With little formal training, these women obtained a charter for the museum from the Territory of Hawaii in 1922 while continuing to catalogue the collection. Cooke wanted a museum that reflected Hawaiʻi's multicultural makeup. Not bound by the traditional Western idea of art museums, she also wanted to showcase the island's climate in an open and airy environment, using courtyards that interconnect the galleries.

The Cookes donated their Beretania Street land along with an endowment of $25,000. Their home was torn down to make way for the museum. New York architect Bertram Goodhue designed a classic Hawaiian-style building with simple off-white exteriors and tiled roofs. He died before the project was completed; it was finished by Hardie Phillip. This style has been imitated in many buildings throughout the state.

On April 8, 1927, the Honolulu Museum of Art opened. There was a traditional Hawaiian blessing and the Royal Hawaiian Band, under the direction of Henri Berger, performed. With the opening of the museum came gifts of many pieces, sometimes even entire collections. Additions to the original building include a library (1956), an education wing (1960), a gift shop (1965), a cafe (1969), a contemporary gallery, administrative offices, a 292-seat theater (1977), and an art center for studio classes and expanded educational programming (1989). In 1999, the museum created a children's interactive gallery, lecture hall, and offices.

The original building was named Hawaiʻi's best building by the Hawaiʻi Chapter of the American Institute of Architecture and is registered as a National and State Historical site. The museum is accredited by the American Alliance of Museums.

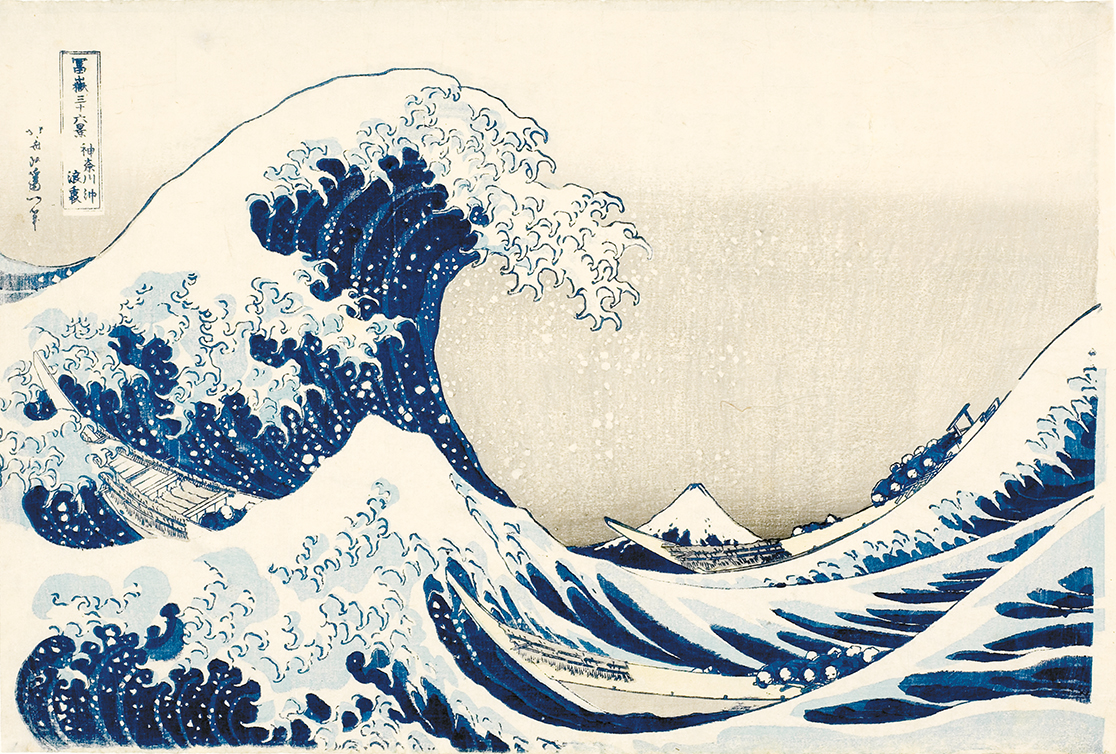
Katsushika Hokusai (1760–1849). The Great Wave off the Coast of Kanagawa, from the series Thirty-six Views of Mount Fuji. Japan, Edo period (1615–1868), 1832. Woodblock print. Ink and color on paper.

In 1998, extensive renovation began, starting with the Asian wing. In September 1999, construction began on the John Hara-designed Henry R. Luce Pavilion Complex, which opened on May 13, 2001. It includes expanded spaces for The Pavilion Café and The Museum Shop and a new two-story exhibition structure. The Luce Complex is named for Henry R. Luce, the co-founder and editor of Time magazine and other publications. His widow, Clare Boothe Luce, had a residence in Hawaiʻi and served on the museum's board of trustees from 1972 to 1977.

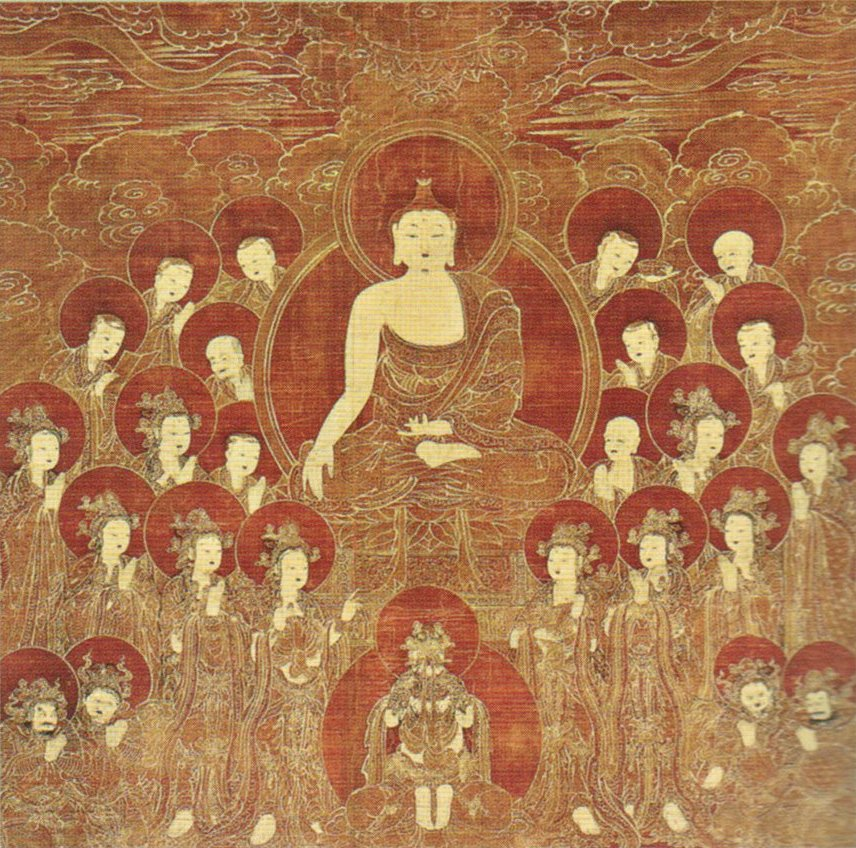
Gautama Buddha and the Eight Great Bodhisattvas, Korea, Joseon dynasty, 16th century

New galleries exploring cross-cultural influences were renovated and reopened in the Western Wing in 1999. A new gallery for Korean art opened in 2001. New galleries for the arts of India, Indonesia, and Southeast Asia were renovated and opened in 2002. A new gallery for the art of the Philippines named for retiring Museum Director and his wife, George and Nancy Ellis, opened in 2003. In 2005, the museum opened an Asian Painting Conservation Studio and renovation of the Western Art galleries was completed.

In 2001, the museum entered into a partnership with the Doris Duke Foundation for Islamic Art, and the theater was refurbished and renamed for her in July 2002. In October 2002, the museum opened a new gallery that serves as the orientation center for all tours to Doris Duke's Honolulu estate Shangri La, which started on November 6, 2002.

On April 17, 2020, the museum laid off one third of its full-time workers and every seasonal worker who worked part time to reduce the spread of COVID-19.

=== The Contemporary Museum and Honolulu Academy of Arts merge ===
The former Contemporary Museum, Honolulu in Makiki Heights was integrated into the Honolulu Academy of Arts in 2011. The academy's board of trustees voted to change the museum's public name to the Honolulu Museum of Art as of March 2012, retaining its legal name as the Honolulu Academy of Arts. The former Contemporary Museum, or Spalding House, became the Honolulu Museum of Art Spalding House, the Art Center at Linekona became the Honolulu Museum of Art School, and The Contemporary Museum at First Hawaiian Center became the Honolulu Museum of Art at First Hawaiian Center.

=== Sale of Spalding House ===
On July 16, 2019, the museum announced that its board of trustees would sell Spalding House in an effort to "allow the museum to focus its resources on its main campus at Beretania Street".

Interim director and trustee Mark Burak said: "From a fiduciary standpoint, we've taken a very long and hard look at this from all angles. While the Spalding House property's beauty and historic significance make it hard to part with, it has also been challenging splitting our attention between two large, resource-intensive art campuses, one limited by several factors that have made it difficult to deliver the kind of quality art exhibitions, programs and services we have desired."

Trustee and chairman of the Building and Grounds Committee Jim Pierce added: "The committee concluded unanimously that it would be to the long-term benefit of HoMA to prepare Spalding House for sale. We are fortunate to have a board and employees who carefully evaluate all options for the future and are continually making changes to ensure that we maintain the solid financial footing necessary to fulfill our mission. Making and enabling this decision has been determined to represent good business practice for the long term."

These comments led many community members to speculate about the institution's well-being. In his editorial Loss Of Spalding House A Reminder Old Money Alone Won't Sustain The Arts, Sterling Higa speculated about the financial history of the institution, widespread urban development across Honolulu, and the arrival of new foreign investment. He wrote: "Our islands play host to out-of-state wealth. Japanese, Canadian and Chinese money pours in. Silicon Valley billionaires plant roots. Given the context, it seems likely that Spalding House will be sold to a foreign buyer, and the grounds will no longer be accessible to the general public. We can pray for salvation, but salvation may not come. Better to hope that the new oligarchy is as generous as the old oligarchy, which bequeathed us relics like Spalding House."

=== Directors ===
- David Odo: 2026 to present
- Halona Norton-Westbrook: 2020 to 2025
- Sean O'Harrow: 2017 to 2019
- Stephan Jost: 2011 to 2016
- Stephen Little: 2003 to 2010
- George R. Ellis: 1982 to 2003
- James W. Foster: 1963 to 1982
- Robert P. Griffing, Jr.: 1947 to 1963
- Edgar C. Schenck: 1935 to 1947
- Kathrine McLane Jenks: 1929 to 1935
- Catharine E. B. Cox: 1927 to 1928
- Frank M. Moore: 1924 to 1927

== Education ==
Education has always been integral to the Honolulu Museum of Art's mission. Working closely with educators and schools, the museum provides tools and experiences to make visual art a foundational element of learning. Its education programs include guided tours, workshops, gallery classes, and children's art activities. School programs include art classes for Special Education students and programs for students in Hawaiʻi public schools, which combine museum tours and hands-on experience creating art in studio classes at the art center. Its educational resources support educators, collectors, students, members, artists, and art historians with a small library and a non-reservation collection.

=== Tours ===
Docents conduct tours for the public, school groups (pre-school and up), and community organizations. Groups of ten or more and classes are requested to schedule tours at least two weeks in advance.

Special tours, focusing on temporary exhibitions often include supplementary materials and activities, some especially designed for children. Workshops for teachers and other educators may also be offered. Theme tours concentrate on a specific country, region, time period, art movement, or groups of artists.

=== Children ===
Gallery Hunt Activity Sheets send visitors through the galleries to find certain works of art that focus on a theme.

Working with the Hawaiʻi Department of Education and Hawaiʻi public schools, the museum provides art education programs for students across the state.

=== Other educational resources ===
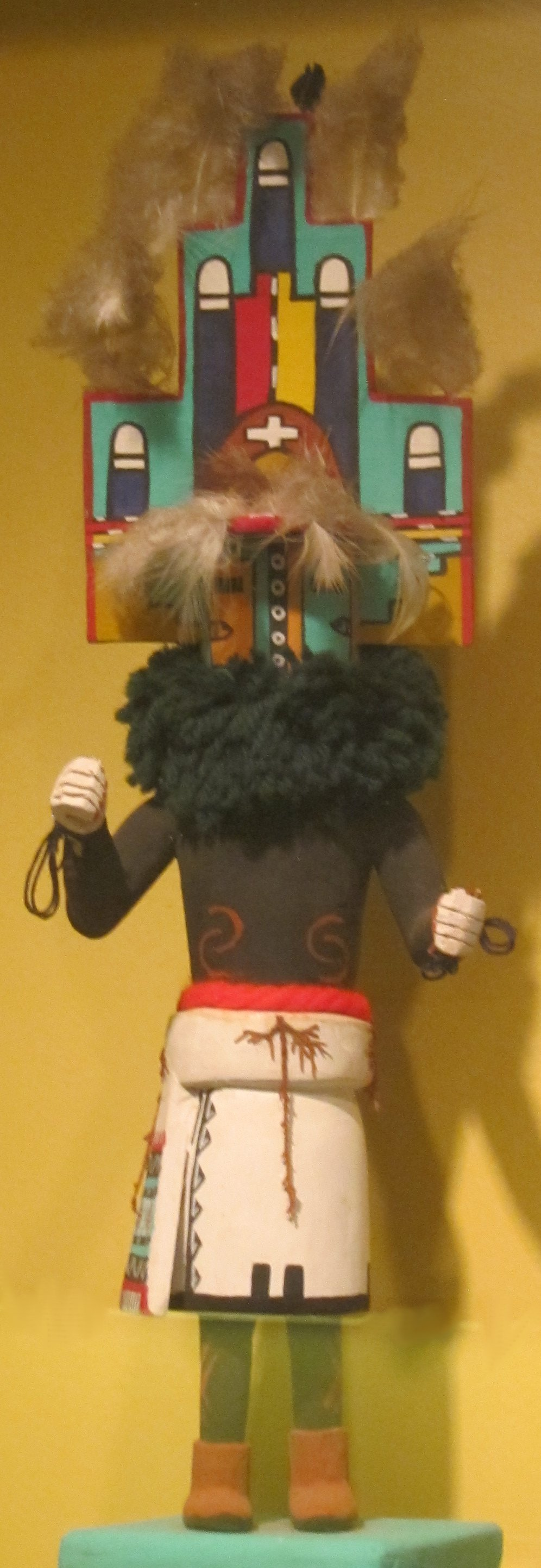
Hemis (home dance) kachina doll, Arizona, Hopi people in the Honolulu Museum of Art

The Robert Allerton Art Research Library is open to college students, members, and other adults for art historical research. It is a non-circulating collection of over 40,000 volumes in a closed stack system and includes general reference materials, museum archives, artist files, and auction catalogues. Free Internet access is provided.

Lending Collection: Art objects, crafts and folk arts from around the world, books, and art work reproductions are some of the many items available for loan in the Lending Collection. The Lending Collection is available to schools, libraries, and other community organizations.

== Luce Pavilion Complex ==
The Luce Pavilion complex opened on May 13, 2001, and includes a cafe, gift shop, and a two-story building with two 4,000-square-foot (370 m^{2}) galleries. Other facilities include underground storage, loading dock, dry-pipe fire sprinklers, vertical transportation systems for passengers, remote video broadcast capabilities, conservation lighting control systems, and a climate control system. The Luce Pavilion Complex is completely wheelchair accessible. The project cost over $9 million.

The complex added 26,000 square feet (2,400 m^{2}), increasing the museum size to 143,000 square feet (13,300 m^{2}). The Luce Foundation donated $3.5 million toward the construction of the complex. Groundbreaking ceremonies for the complex were held on September 23, 1999, and the grand opening was on May 13, 2001. The Henry R. Luce Gallery holds traveling exhibitions.

=== The John Dominis and Patches Damon Holt Gallery ===
The second floor gallery of the Henry R. Luce Wing in the Luce Pavilion Complex houses works from the museum's Arts of Hawaiʻi collection. The John Dominis and Patches Damon Holt Gallery includes an introduction to indigenous Hawaiian art, early Western views of Hawaiʻi, and the art of contemporary Hawaiʻi-based artists. The gallery reflects changing life and landscapes of post European-contact Hawaiʻi as well as its exploration of Hawaiʻi's changing artistic traditions as Island communities grew and became less isolated during the 19th and early 20th centuries.

Early views of Hawaiʻi, dating from the last decades of the 18th century and the beginning of the 19th, by expedition artists such as England's John Webber and Robert Dampier, France's Auguste Borget and Stanislaus Darondeau, and Russia's Louis Choris, present images of the Western world's first contact with Hawaiʻi. Nineteenth-century images by European artists such as George Burgess, Paul Emmert, Nicholas Chevalier, and James Gay Sawkins, who passed through Hawaiʻi, show the growth of Western-style communities and an appreciation for the land and sea.

The Holt Gallery also features painting, watercolors, drawings, prints and photographs by artists such as Enoch Wood Perry, Jules Tavernier, D. Howard Hitchcock, John La Farge, Georgia O'Keeffe, Ansel Adams, Brett Weston, Roi Partridge, and Jean Charlot. Works by Hawaiʻi-born artists including Marguerite Louis Blasingame, Isami Doi, Hon Chew Hee, Cornelia MacIntyre Foley, and Keichi Kimura reveal the development of an indigenous modernist tradition in 20th-century Hawaiʻi, and include such contemporary artists as Lisa Reihana, James Jack, and Yan Pei Ming. Other regional artists in the collection include Charles W. Bartlett, Juliette May Fraser, Shirley Russell, Madge Tennent, and John Young. The John Dominis and Patches Damon Holt Gallery also features space for changing exhibitions that focus on the arts of Hawaiʻi.

The Holt Gallery was named for John Dominis Holt and his late wife Frances "Patches" Damon Holt. John Dominis Holt was born to part-Hawaiian parents of aliʻi rank. He learned the religion, customs, mythology, and the Hawaiian language. By the time he was a teen, he was already a genealogist.

Frances "Patches" Damon Holt was actively involved in many cultural projects. The descendant of a missionary family and a graduate of Punahou School, she received a law degree from Columbia University and was educated in England. Together with her older sister, Harriet Baldwin, she helped oppose the H-3 project through Moanalua Valley. They also established a foundation to help preserve cultural and environmental values.

=== HoMA Café & Coffee Bar ===
The café was established in 1969. It had a simple menu and for over 20 years was operated by volunteers. Professional management and staff were gradually added. In 1999, the café moved during construction of the Luce Pavilion Complex, and more than doubled in size to 3,100 square feet (290 m^{2}). It overlooks a granite fountain with a reflection pond and sculptures by Jun Kaneko.

The HoMA Café offers casual contemporary cuisine and refreshments in a relaxed setting, complementing the museum experience. The open-air café also follows ocean-friendly practices as part of its commitment to more sustainable operations.

The Coffee Bar is outdoors in the museum's Palm Courtyard, with a selection of coffee and tea drinks, beer and wine, and grab-and-go menu items.

There is no charge to dine at the Café during lunch hours.

== Gallery ==
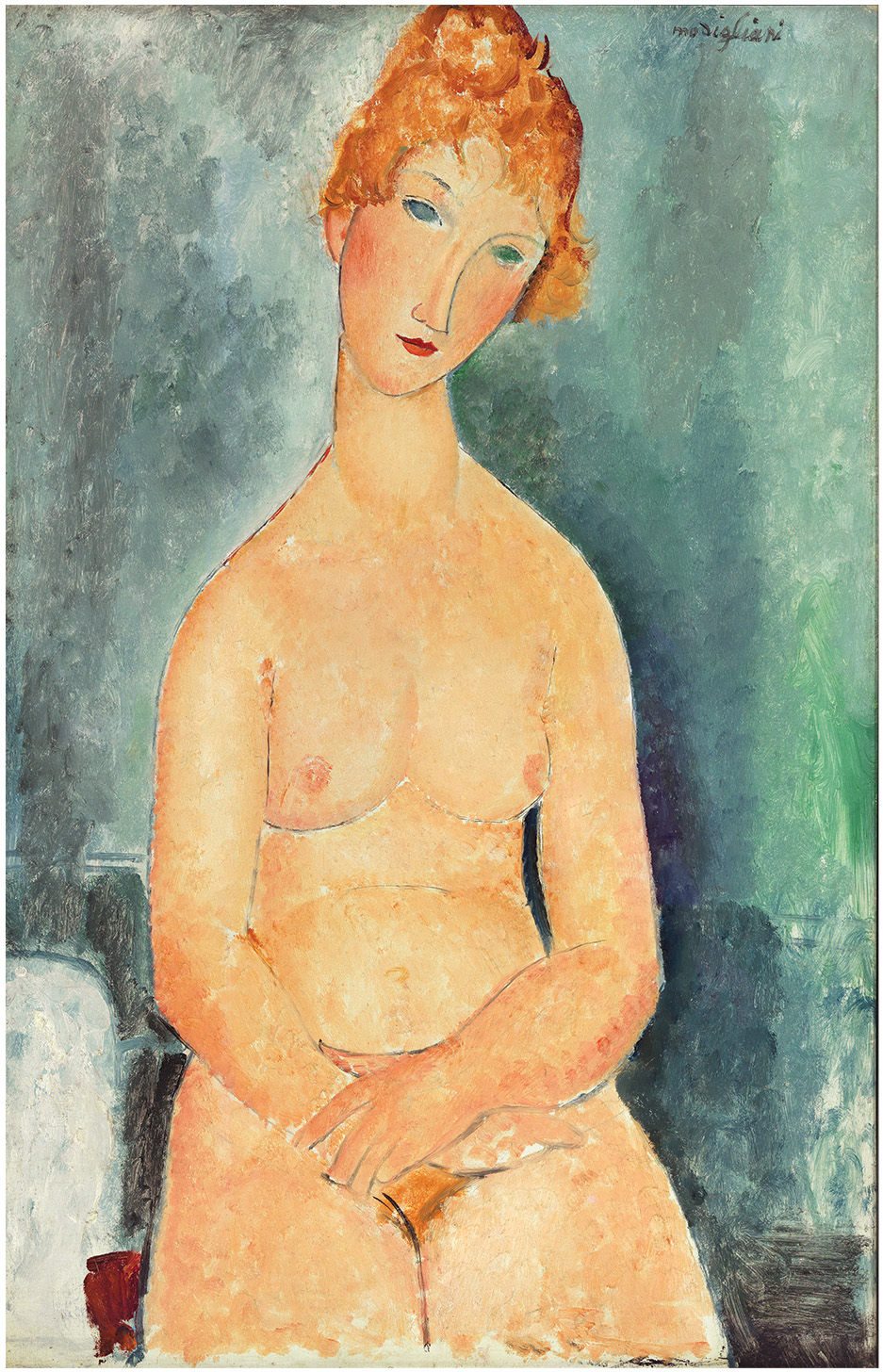
Amedeo Modigliani (Italian, 1884–1920), Seated Nude, c. 1918. Oil on canvas. Gift of Mrs. Carter Galt, 1960 (2895.1)

== See also ==
- Gustav Ecke
- Honolulu Museum of Art School
- Richard Douglas Lane
- Shangri La (Doris Duke)
- Spalding House

== Footnotes ==
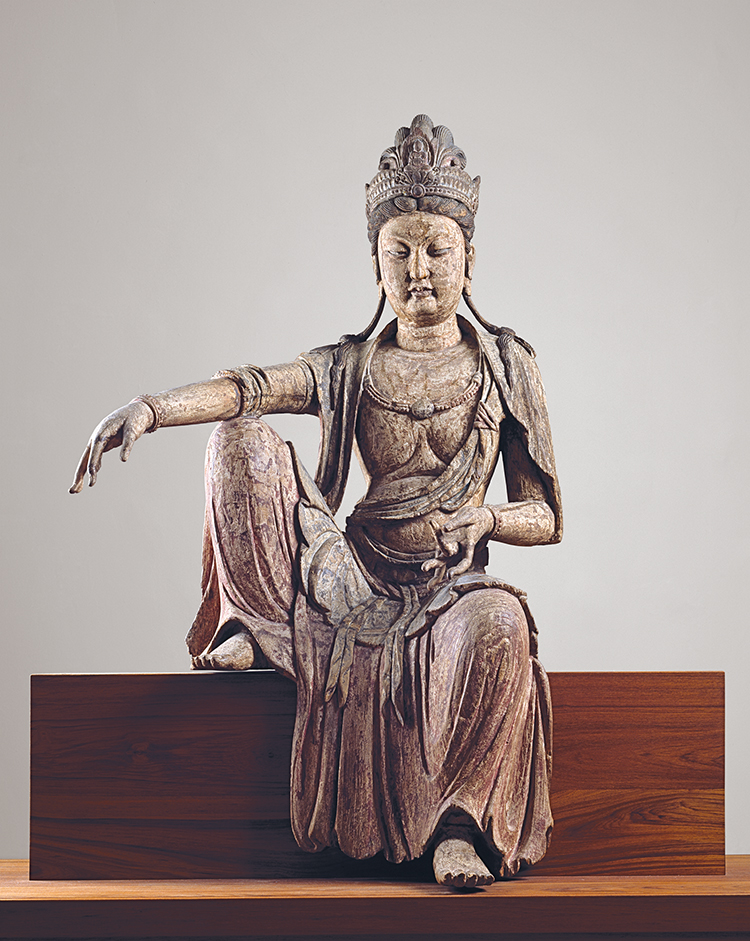
"Guanyin (Bodhisattva)", China, Northern Song (960-1126) or Tangut Xia (1038-1227) dynasty, first half of the 11th century. Wood with traces of pigment.
