= Jean-Jacques =

Jean-Jacques is a French name, equivalent to "John James" in English. Since the second half of 18th century, Jean Jacques Rousseau was widely known as Jean Jacques. Notable people bearing this name include:

== Given name ==
- Jean-Jacques Annaud (born 1943), French film director, screenwriter and producer
- John James Audubon, born Jean-Jacques Rabin (1785–1851), American ornithologist and painter of Breton origin
- Jean-Jacques Bertrand (1916–1973), Premier of Quebec, Canada
- Jean-Jacques Burnel (born 1952), Franco-English musician, bassist
- Jean-Jacques Challet-Venel (1811–1893), member of the Swiss Federal Council
- Jean-Jacques Colin (1784-1865), French chemist
- Jean-Jacques Conceição (born 1964), Angolan basketball player
- Jean-Jacques von Dardel (1918–1989), Swedish diplomat
- Jean-Jacques De Gucht (born 1983), Flemish politician and member of Open VLD
- Jean-Jacques Dessalines (1758–1806), a leader of the Haïtian Revolution
- Jean-Jacques Domoraud (born 1981), Côte d'Ivoire footballer
- Jean-Jacques Goldman (born 1951), French singer-songwriter
- Jean-Jacques Honorat (1931-2023), 3rd Prime Minister of Haiti
- Jean-Jacques Kieffer (1857–1925), French naturalist and entomologist
- Jean-Jacques Lafon (born 1955), French singer-songwriter
- Jean-Jacques Lefranc, Marquis de Pompignan (1709–1784), French poet
- Jean-Jacques Manget (1652–1742), Swiss physician and writer
- Jean-Jacques Naudet (1945–2026), French photographer
- Jean-Jacques Olier (1608–1657), French priest and the founder of the Sulpicians
- Jean-Jacques Perrey (1929–2016), French electronic music producer
- Jean-Jacques Rousseau (1712–1778), Genevan/French philosopher, widely known as Jean Jacques
- Jean-Jacques Servan-Schreiber (1924–2006), French journalist and politician
- Jean-Jacques Susini (1933-2017), French political figure and co-founder of the Organisation armée secrète
- Jean-Jacques Winders (1849–1936), Belgian architect

== Surname ==
- Jamil Jean-Jacques (born 1975), a Haitian football player
- Martin Jean-Jacques (born 1960), a Dominican cricketer

== See also ==
- 1461 Jean-Jacques, a main belt asteroid
- Jean-Jacques: The Early Life and Work of Jean-Jacques Rousseau, 1712–1754
- Jean (male given name)
- Jacques, name list
