= James Jack =

James Jack may refer to

- James Jack (artist) (born 1979), American Asian contemporary artist
- James Jack (trade unionist) (1910–1987), Scottish trade unionist
- James Jack (1731–1822), American who carried the Mecklenburg Declaration of Independence
- Julian Jack (James Julian Bennett Jack, born 1936), New Zealand physiologist
- James Lochhead Jack (1880–1962), British Army officer
- James Millar Jack (1847/48–1912), Scottish trade unionist

== See also ==
- James Jacks (1947–2014), American film producer
