= Jacquez =

Jacquez may refer to:

- Jacquez, San Jose, barangay in the Philippines
- Jacquez or Black Spanish (grape) American hybrid grape

== People with the name Jacquez ==
- Jacquez Green (born 1976), American former football player
- Al Jacquez, original member, bassist and vocalist of Savage Grace (Michigan rock band)
- Pat Jacquez (born 1947), American former baseball pitcher
- Tom Jacquez (born 1975), American former baseball pitcher

== See also ==
- Jacques (disambiguation)
- Jaquez, surname
