= Andrew Jack =

Andrew Jack may refer to:

- Andrew Jack (dialect coach) (1944–2020), British dialect coach and actor
- Andrew Jack (censor), chief censor of New Zealand
- Andrew Keith Jack (1885–1966), Australian physicist
- Andy Jack (1920–2004), Scottish football centre forward
