= James Jack (artist) =

James Jack. Contemporary artist in Singapore

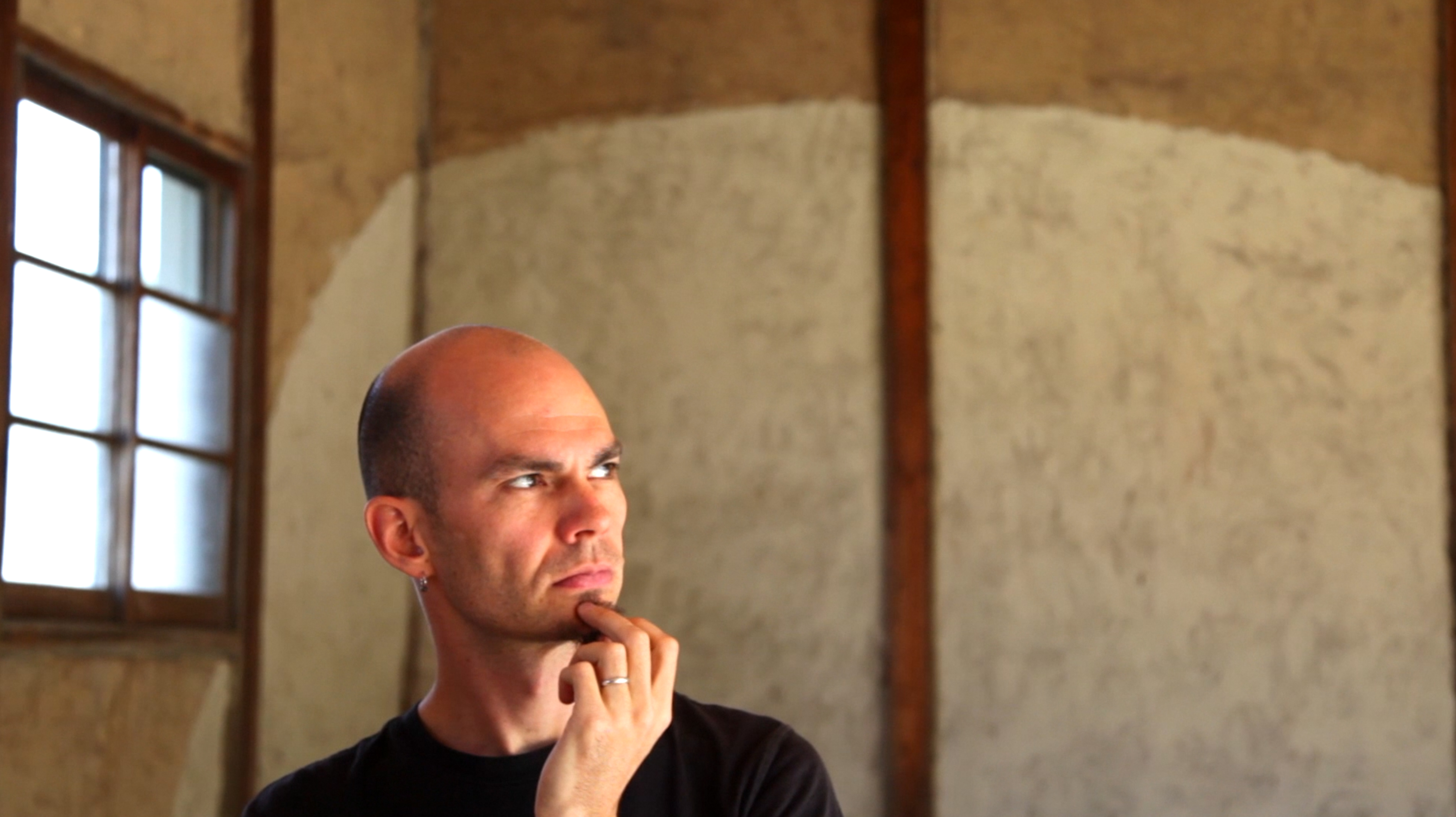
- Education: PhD, Tokyo University of the Arts
- Known for: Contemporary art
- Awards: Crown Prince Akihito Scholar 2008-2010
- Website: jamesjack.org

James Jack (ジェームズ ジャック, born 1979) is a contemporary artist based in Japan.

== Early life and education ==
Jack was raised on the East side of Manhattan, lived in Kyoto during the late 1990s and has lived in Asia Pacific for the past two decades. Jack received a Bachelor of Arts degree from Sarah Lawrence College studying with Gary Burnley, Sandy Skoglund, and Joel Sternfeld and completed advanced studies in Japanese at the Stanford Inter-University Center for Japanese Studies. He completed a Master of Arts degree in Japanese Art History at the University of Hawai‘i at Mānoa and a Ph.D. in the Painting Department with Yoshitaka Mōri, Tsuyoshi Ozawa, Ritsuko Taho and Toyomi Hoshina at Tokyo University of the Arts.

== Career ==
Jack was a Crown Prince Akihito Scholar pursuing artistic research in Tokyo from 2008 to 2010. He was a Japan Society for the Promotion of Science Postdoctoral Artist Fellow at Social Art Lab at Kyushu University from 2016 to 2017 and taught Art Practice at Yale-NUS College in Singapore from 2018-2022 while directing the Artist-in-Residence program and is currently Associate Professor of Intermedia Art at Waseda University.

== Selected artwork ==
=== Sunset House, 2010-2020 ===
Jack created a community artwork titled Sunset House: The House as Language of Being for the Setouchi Triennale (2013/2016) in the former site of a clubhouse for stone quarry workers on the island of Shodo.

=== Molokai Window, 2018 ===
Jack worked with residents on the island of Molokai to respectfully open a window with local pigments and stories that recenter islands in the Pacific according to local protocols for community collaboration in the solo exhibition Molokai Window held at Honolulu Museum of Art in 2018 curated by Healoha Johnston supported by the inaugural artist-in-residence program at Molokai Arts Center.

=== Sea Birth trilogy, 2017-2020 ===
Sea Birth trilogy is composed of sea spirits, love amidst violence and rebirth. Sea Birth one was exhibited at Museum of the Sky in 2016, Sea Birth two was exhibited at Ichihanari Art Festival in Okinawa during 2018 and Sea Birth three at the University of Hawai‘i at Mānoa Art Gallery and Donkey Mill Art Center in 2020. Selections from the work have also been screened at NTU Centre for Contemporary Art Singapore, BARRAK alternative art space Okinawa and Asia Research Institute at National University of Singapore.

== Exhibitions ==
Jack's artworks engaging with social and ecological environments have been included in numerous exhibitions including: Honolulu Museum of Art (2018); Centre for Contemporary Art Singapore (2017); Fukuoka Prefectural Museum of Art (2016); Setouchi International Art Festival (2013 and 2016); Tokyo Metropolitan Museum of Art (2015); Institute of Contemporary Art Singapore (2014); Busan Biennale Sea Art Festival (2013); and the Echigo-Tsumari Triennial (2009). The exhibit Inundation: Art and Climate Change opened in Honolulu (January–March 2020) and went to the Island of Hawai‘i (July–October 2020). Artworks continue to grow into publications, exhibits and workshops.

== Writings ==
His writings have been published in Shima, Art Asia Pacific, The Japan Times, Modern Art Asia, LASALLE College of the Arts Singapore, Satoshi Koyama Gallery and The Contemporary Museum of Hawai‘i.

== Artist Collective ==
Jack is one of the founding members of the artist collective bacilli (former World Dirt Association) that began in 2014 with Yoshitaka Nanjo and Shotaro Yoshino based on their love of earth. bacilli exhibitions and projects include Setouchi Art Triennial 2022 the Water and Land Niigata Art Festival 2015, SYP Projects 2015, Ichihara Art x Mix 2017 and Social Art Lab Yame Remix. Projects include a performative work based on local residents’ stories of dirt “Soilstory” to be presented at Suzu 2023 Oku-Noto Triennale.

== Residencies ==
Jack has been artist in residence at the Centre for Contemporary Art Singapore, Vermont Studio Center, Ku Art Center, Sitka Center for Art & Ecology, and the Orford Center.

== Media ==
=== Inundation: Art and Climate Change in the Pacific ===
Jaimey Hamilton Faris and Azusa Takahashi 2020

=== In Praise of Shadows ===
Michelle Ho 2017

=== One-hundred Stories Told by Art ===
Masahiro Ushiroshōji 2016

== Literature ==
- Wee, Darryl Jingwen, “James Jack’s Sunset House on Shodoshima”, BLOUIN ARTINFO, 5 November 2013
- Kitagawa, Fram, “Yūyake hausu: Gengo ga yadoru ie” (“Sunset House: Language as the house of Being”), Shikoku shinbun, 6 July 2013
- “Play with Nature, Played by Nature”, Exhibition catalog author, Tokyo: Satoshi Koyama Gallery, June 2013
- “Philosophies of Dirt: James Jack”, Introduction by poet Brandon Shimoda, Solo exhibition catalog, Tokyo: Satoshi Koyama Gallery, October 2012
