= Jaquez =

Jaquez is a surname. Notable people with the name include:

- Anna Jaquez (born 1953), American artist and art professor
- César Duarte Jáquez (born 1963), Mexican politician
- Brother-and-sister Mexican-American basketball players:
  - Jaime Jaquez Jr. (born 2001)
  - Gabriela Jaquez (born 2003)
- Pablo Jáquez (born 1995), Mexican footballer
- Sonya Jaquez Lewis, American politician

== See also ==
- Jacquez (disambiguation) § People with the name Jacquez
- Jaques, given name and surname
