= Bob Jacques =

English rugby league footballer

Personal information
- Full name: Robert Jacques

Playing information
- Position: Centre
Club
Years	Team	Pld	T	G	FG	P
1902–05	Wakefield Trinity	82	12	23	0	82

Bob Jacques was a professional rugby league footballer who played in the 1900s. He played at club level for Wakefield Trinity, as a centre.

== Playing career ==
=== Drop-goals (field-goals) ===
Bob Jacques appears to have scored no drop-goals (or field-goals as they are currently known in Australasia), but prior to the 1974–75 season all goals, whether; conversions, penalties, or drop-goals, scored 2-points, consequently prior to this date drop-goals were often not explicitly documented, therefore '0' drop-goals may indicate drop-goals not recorded, rather than no drop-goals scored. In addition, prior to the 1949–50 season, the archaic field-goal was also still a valid means of scoring points.
