= William Jack =

William Jack is the name of:

- William Jack (athlete) (born 1930), British Olympic sprinter
- William Jack (American politician) (1788–1852), member of the U.S. House of Representatives
- William Jack (Australian politician) (1892–1982)
- William Jack (botanist) (1795–1822), of Scotland
- William Jack (mathematician) (1834–1924), from Scotland
- William Brydone Jack (1817–1886), Canadian mathematician and astronomer
