= Richard C. Jack =

British animator and filmmaker

Richard C. Jack is a British animator and award-winning filmmaker living in Brooklyn, NY. Jack is best known for writing and directing Rockin’ and Rollin’, an animated short produced by Tandem Films (UK). Rockin’ and Rollin’ takes a candid look at the losers’ bench–from the POV of pool balls.

Jack is currently the Director of Animation Programming for RockAMedia LLC–a New York City based media production and distribution company.

Jack studied animation at Bournemouth University (UK). His animation credits include Disney’s Tigger Movie, Warner Brother’s Space Jam plus various TV commercials and children’s TV projects. Jack has worked as an art director, illustrator, storyboard artist and character designer at studios in both London and New York.

Richard C. Jack has also created live action music videos for Bruce Dickinson, Muck and the Mires, Katy Mae and the Giraffes but has an enormous chip on his shoulder and is firmly wedged in the mid 1980s in most aspects of his life.

== Awards ==
(for Rockin’ and Rollin’) New York Expo: Best Debut Film, FAN, Norwich: Best Independent Film, Cinanima International Animated Film Festival, Portugal: Best Film under 7 minutes http://www.cinanima.pt, Bilbao International Film Festival of Documentary and Short Film: Gold Mikeldi for Animation http://www.zinebi.com, Portugal Festivideo: The Big Prize, Manhattan Short Film Festival: Public Vote Best Film http://www.msfilmfest.com, Kalamazoo Michigan International Animation Festival: Best of Show https://web.archive.org/web/20070118135855/http://kafi.kvcc.edu/, Crested Butte Reel Festival, Colorado: Gold Award Winner

== Studios ==
LONDON: Ice Pick, Tandem, Panico Productions (studio owned by Julian Doyle - Director of Photography for Brazil, Holy Grail, and other Gilliam-related projects), Blue Sunflower Studios, Uli Meyer Animation, Passion Pictures

NEW YORK: RockAMedia LLC http://www.rockamedia.com, DMA Animation, High5 Games, Badcat

== Music videos ==
The Giraffes “The Border”–Writer and Director, Muck and the Mires “Doreen”–Writer and Director, Katy Mae “Safe and Sound”–Writer and Director, Bruce Dickenson (Iron Maiden) solo project promo videos for The Tower and The Killing Floor–Art Director
