= Jaques Nunatak =

Jaques Nunatak (67°53′S 66°12′E) is a small nunatak lying 3 nautical miles (6 km) south-southwest of Mount Kennedy in the Gustav Bull Mountains of Mac. Robertson Land, Antarctica. It was mapped from Australian National Antarctic Research Expeditions air photos taken in 1936 and 1959, and named by the Antarctic Names Committee of Australia for G.A. Jaques, a weather observer at Mawson Station in 1967.
