= Jacque =

Jacque is a given name and a surname which may refer to:

== People ==
- Jacque Aye, Nigerian-American comic artist and writer
- Jacque Batt (died 2014), American First Lady of Idaho 1994–1999
- Jaque Fourie (born 1983), South African former rugby union rugby player
- Jacque Fresco (1916–2017), American futurist and self-described social engineer
- Jacque Jack Jenkins (American football) (1921–1982), American football player
- Jacque Jones (born 1975), American Major League Baseball assistant hitting coach and former player
- Jacque LaPrarie, American college football player in the early 1980s
- Jacque MacKinnon (1938–1975), American League Football and National League Football player
- Jacquelyn Jacque Mercer (1931–1982), winner of the Miss America beauty pageant in 1949
- Jacqueline Jacque Reid (born 1975), American television and radio host, journalist and former news anchor
- Jacque Robinson (born 1963), American football player
- Jacque Vaughn (born 1975), American National Basketball Association assistant coach and former player
- André Jacque (born 1980), American politician
- Charles Jacque (1813–1894), French painter of animals and engraver
- Olivier Jacque (born 1973), French former Grand Prix motorcycle road racer

== Fictional characters ==
- the title character of the 1772 Daniel Defoe novel Colonel Jack, also spelled Jacque

== See also ==
- Jacq, surname
- Jacques (disambiguation)
