= Jacque Aye =

Nigerian-American writer

- Born: Kansas, US
- Areas: Cartoonist, Writer
- Notable works: Adorned By Chi; The Magical Girl's Guide to Life; The Magical Girl's Self-Care Coloring Book; How to Be a Better Adult; Monster High: New Scaremester; How to Escape Death

Jacque Aye is a Nigerian-American comic writer and novelist. Her works are strongly inspired by Japanese anime and tend to have Black women protagonists.

== Personal life ==
Aye was born in Kansas and grew up in Dallas, where she spent time together with her older brother, with whom she first discovered anime by watching Sailor Moon, which would go on to heavily influence her adult works.

Aye is a queer woman.

== Career ==
Aye founded the lifestyle brand Adorned by Chi in 2015.

In 2018 she began publishing her webcomic, also titled Adorned By Chi. It was inspired by works like Sailor Moon and the Igbo culture of Nigeria, just like the positive representation of Black people in anime like Tiger & Bunny, Michiko to Hatchin and Afro Samurai, and like other independent Western projects with a magical girl theme. The graphic novel edition was funded by Kickstarter.

Her second work was The Magical Girl's Guide to Life, published with Ulysses Press. It is an adult nonfiction book about self-care, including guidance for readers and her own experiences.

In 2023 she published her third work, The Magical Girl's Self-Care Coloring Book, in collaboration with the illustrator Venus Bambisa and strongly inspired by the aesthetic of magical girls.

She published her first novel, How to Be a Better Adult, in 2023.

Her literary influences include Terry Pratchett, Douglas Adams, and Neil Gaiman. She shares with them dark humor and her writing style, although she addresses different themes in her work than those that characterize these authors.

In 2024, she worked as the writer for the comic series Monster High: New Scaremester, based on the franchise Monster High. The first three issues were published between August and November 2024.

In 2025 she published her book How to Escape Death, the sequel to How to Be a Better Adult.

== Works ==
- Adorned By Chi (2018-2019)
- The Magical Girl’s Guide to Life (2021)
- These Bewitching Bonds (2021, Anthology)
- How to Be a Better Adult (2023)
- The Magical Girl's Self-Care Coloring Book (2023)
- I Live to Serve The Witch (2024)
- Monster High: New Scaremester #1-3 (2024)
- How to Escape Death (2025)
