= Isaac Allen Jack =

Canadian lawyer and author

Isaac Allen Jack (26 June 1843 – 5 April 1903) was a Canadian lawyer and author.
