= Jacques P. Barber =

American academic

Jacques P. Barber is a French-born, American clinical psychologist and psychotherapy researcher. He is an Emeritus Professor and Dean at the Gordon F. Derner School of Psychology (formerly the Institute of Advanced Studies in Psychology) at Adelphi University. He served as Dean from August 2011 until his retirement in August 2023.

== Career ==
Before joining Adelphi, Barber was a full professor in the Department of Psychiatry and the Psychology Graduate Group at the University of Pennsylvania, where he is now Emeritus Professor of Psychology. He also holds the title of Adjunct Professor of Psychiatry at the New York University School of Medicine.

Barber has held several prominent positions in the field of psychology, including serving as the past president of the International Society for Psychotherapy Research (SPR). His contributions to the field have been recognized with numerous awards, including the Early Career Award (1996) and the Distinguished Research Career Award (2014) from the SPR. In 2018, he received the Distinguished Psychologist Award from the Society for the Advancement of Psychotherapy (APA Division 29), and in 2019, the Research Award from the Society for Psychoanalysis and Psychoanalytic Psychology (APA Division 39). He has also been a visiting professor at the Department of Clinical Neuroscience of the Karolinska Institute in Stockholm and at universities in Australia. He is a licensed clinical psychologist in New York and Pennsylvania.

== Research ==
His research primarily focuses on the outcomes and processes of psychodynamic and cognitive therapies for conditions such as depression, panic disorder, substance dependence, and personality disorders. His work, funded by organizations such as the National Institute of Mental Health (NIMH) and the National Institute on Drug Abuse (NIDA), has involved conducting randomized clinical trials to evaluate the effectiveness of these therapies. Barber's psychotherapy process research is guided by conceptual models that emphasize both relational and technical factors, with particular attention to the therapeutic alliance and the use of theoretically relevant interventions by therapists.

In addition to his treatment research, Barber has studied individual core conflicts and metacognition across various populations, including children of Holocaust survivors. Over his career, he has published more than 380 papers, chapters, and books in the fields of psychotherapy and personality, accumulating over 28,000 citations and an h-index of 86.

== Selected publications ==
=== Recent books ===
- Psychodynamic Therapy: A Guide to Evidence-Based Practice, 2nd edition (2024) with Richard Summers and Sigal Zilcha Mano.
- Practicing Psychodynamic Therapy: A Casebook (2014) with Richard Summers.
- Visions in Psychotherapy Research and Practice: Reflections from the Presidents of the Society for Psychotherapy Research co-edited with Bernhard Strauss and Louis Georges Castonguay.
- Echoes of the Trauma: Relationship Themes and Emotions in the Narratives of the Children of Holocaust Survivors co-authored with Hadas Wiseman.
- The Therapeutic Alliance: An Evidence-Based Approach to Practice co-edited with John Christopher Muran.

Barber is also known for his commitment to mentoring students and postdoctoral fellows throughout his career.

=== Main refereed journal papers ===
1. Barber, J.P., & DeRubeis, R.J. (1989). On second thought: Where the action is in cognitive therapy for depression. Cognitive Therapy and Research, 13, 441-457.

2. Diguer, L., Barber, J.P., & Luborsky, L., (1993). Three concomitants: Personality disorder, psychiatric severity, and outcome of dynamic psychotherapy of major depression. American Journal of Psychiatry, 150, 1246-1248.

3. Crits-Christoph, P., Barber, J.P., & Kurcias, J.S. (1993). The accuracy of therapists' interpretations and the development of the therapeutic alliance. Psychotherapy Research, 3, 25-35.

2. Barber, J.P., Crits-Christoph, P., & Luborsky, L. (1996). Effects of therapist adherence and competence on patient outcome in brief dynamic therapy. Journal of Consulting and Clinical Psychology, 64, 619-622.

3. Barber, J.P & Muenz, L.R. (1996). The role of avoidance and obsessiveness in matching patients to cognitive and interpersonal psychotherapy: Empirical findings from the Treatment for Depression Collaborative Research Program. Journal of Consulting and Clinical Psychology, 64, 951-958.

4. Crits-Christoph, P., Siqueland, L., Blaine, J., Frank, A., Luborsky, L., Onken, L.S., Muenz, L., Thase, M.E., Weiss, R.D., Gastfriend, D.R., Woody, G., Barber, J.P., Butler, S.F., Daley, D., Bishop, S., Najavits, L.M., Lis, J., Mercer, D., Griffin, M.L., Beck, A., Moras, K. (1997). The NIDA cocaine collaborative treatment study: Rationale and methods. Archives General Psychiatry, 54, 721-726.

5. Barber, J.P., Morse, J.Q., Krakauer, I., Chittams, J. & Crits-Christoph, K. (1997). Change in obsessive-compulsive and avoidant personality disorders following time-limited supportive-expressive therapy. Psychotherapy, 34, 133-143. doi: 10.1037/h0087774
