= Water and Land Niigata Art Festival =

Art festival that started in 2009

- Genre: Contemporary Art
- Frequency: Triennale, every 3 years
- Locations: Niigata, Japan
- Inaugurated: 2009

Water and Land Niigata Art Festival (水と土の芸術祭, Mizu no Tsuchi no Geishutsusai) is an art festival which started in 2009. Started by the local government, it is held every three years in Niigata City, Japan. The main theme of the festival is "Where have we come from, and where are we going? - From Niigata's Water and Land: Examining the Future through the Present and the Past -." It aims to explore how local culture in Niigata has been influenced by the water and land in the area, and at the same time, it also asks participants to reflect upon the relationship between nature and humanity. Niigata has always been known as "a place of meeting between water and land", as it is situated between two major rivers in Japan, the Shinano and the Agano, and is known as for its wetlands and rice-growing regions. It also illustrates the respect for the wisdom of Niigata residents' predecessors overcoming natural disasters.

== History ==
=== Water and Land Niigata Art Festival 2015 ===
Date
Saturday, June 18 - Monday, October 12, 2015 (total 87 days)

Location

- Main Fields: Toyanogata, Fukushimagata, Sakata and Uwasekigata
- Base Camp: Former Futaba Junior High School
- Satellite Festival Locations: Tenjuen Garden and IKUTOPIA SHOKU HANA (Food & Flower Complex)

Participating artists

- Eisaku Andou
- Katsumi Asaba
- /BONBORI Lighting Architect & Associates, Inc.
- Atelier Bow-Wow
- Dot architects (Toshikatsu Ienari + Takeshi Shakushiro + Wataru Doi)
- Takashi Fujino / Ikimono Architects
- Anne Graham
- Guan Huai Bin
- Katsuhiko Hibino
- Naoki Ishikawa
- Yukihisa Isobe
- Masahide Kakudate
- Kimio Tsuchiya Art Project Team (Tadayuki Tahara + Kohsuke Kimura)
- Masayuki Kishimoto
- Chie Konno
- Shunsuke Kurakata
- Noriaki Maeda
- Junko Maruyama × Hukazawa Art Laboratory Planting Labo Cabu
- Miki Maruyama+Akira Hasegawa
- Yuuki Minamikawa
- Noism 0
- Noism 1
- Noism 2
- Shohei Oka + Kenraku Tokumoto
- Yoshihide Ohtomo
- Rica Ohya
- Oscar Oiwa
- Jaume Plensa
- Koichi Sakao
- Tetsuo Sekine
- 【SHELTER】project GOZU-NS
- Yee Sookyung
- Yoichi Takada
- Nobuyuki Takahashi
- Team Monolith
- Mariko Tomomasa
- u ru sa☆nai
- Wang Wen-Chih
- World Dirt Association
- Xiao Xiao
- Yuri Miyauchi
- Yukihiro Yoshihara

=== Water and Land Niigata Art Festival 2018 ===
Water and Land Niigata Art Festival 2018 (in Japanese also called "水と土の芸術祭2018") marked the 4th "Water and Land – Niigata Art Festival".

- Date: 14/07/2018–08/10/2018 (87 days)
- Venues: Bandaijima Multipurpose Plaza (main venue); Niigata City Center for Creative Arts and International Youth Exchange, and others at various locations within Niigata City (satellite venues)
- General Director: Arata Tani
- Organisers: Water and Land Niigata Art Festival 2018 Execution Committee
- This exhibition worked with artists inside and outside Japan, and the participation of citizens of Niigata.

List of participating artists:

- Shin Morikita
- Navin Rawanchaikul
- Yasuaki Onishi
- Shiro Matsui
- Kosho Ito
- Chiharu Shiota
- Toshikatsu Endo
- Takahiro Iwasaki
- Ryoichi Majima
- Jaume Plensa
- Miho Takamizawa
- Enpei Ito
- Fumito Urabe
- Kiyoko Sakata
- Kenichi Ushikubo
- Satoshi Kakuchi
- Motohiro Tomii
- Enpei Ito
- Miho Takamizawa
- Chika Ito
- Yoo, Geun-Taek
- Kei Arai
- Sergey Vasenkin
- Han Ishu
- Syoin Kajii
- Toshikatsu Endo
- Akiko Ikeuchi
- Tadasu Yamamoto
- Noe Aok
- Chisen Furukawa
- Satoru Hoshino
- Chie Aoki
- Satoru Hoshino
- Kei Arai×Yoo, Geun-Taek
- Satoru Hoshino
- Chisen Furukawa
- Yuki Minamikawa
- Guan Huai Bin
- Tatsumi Orimoto
- Han Ishu
- Terue Yamauchi
- Noe Aoki
- Yukihisa Isobe
- Katsuhiko Hibino
- Yoichi Takada
- Kimio Tsuchiya APT
- Katsumi Asaba

Number of visitors: approximately 717,000 people
