= Noel Morrison Jack =

Australian ornithologist

Noel Morrison Jack (died c. 1985 (Note: An obituary, published in The Emu in 1985, doesn't specify a date of death.)) was an Australian amateur ornithologist who was involved with the Royal Australasian Ornithologists Union for more than 25 years.

== Early life ==
Jack grew up in Queensland, Australia, where he attended St. Joseph's College. He served during the Second World War, from 1941 to 1945, as a sapper in the Royal Australian Engineers. For most of his career, he worked as a painter, although he maintained an avid interest in ornithology throughout his life.

== Ornithology ==
Many of Jack's ornithological findings were published in the journal Queensland Bird Notes. His first contribution to the ornithological journal Emu was about the territorial and nesting behaviour of the rufous whistler. Jack served as a Queensland State Representative for the Royal Australasian Ornithologists Union from 1952, and was elected Queensland Branch Secretary in 1958, continuing in this role until 1969. He remained a Regional Representative for the Union until 1977. Jack self-financed a small publication, A List of the Birds of Brisbane, in 1963, with a "Supplementary List" added four years later.

== Death and legacy ==
Jack died around 1985. Friend and fellow ornithologist Arnold McGill wrote that Jack "had a deep commitment not only for ornithology but love of nature generally." McGill stated that Jack was "an amateur ornithologist of rare dedication to his subject and he will long be remembered for his important contributions to the study of birds of southern Queensland and especially those of Brisbane and its environs".
