= Leslie Innes Jacques =

British Army officer

- Born: 11 December 1897; Bristol, England
- Died: 28 December 1959 (aged 62)
- Military career
- Allegiance: United Kingdom
- Branch: British Army
- Service years: 1916–1953
- Rank: Brigadier
- Unit: Royal Engineers
- Conflicts: First World War; Second World War
- Awards: Commander of the Order of the Bath (1953) Commander of the Order of the British Empire (1945) Military Cross (1919)

Brigadier Leslie Innes Jacques, CB CBE MC (11 December 1897 – 28 December 1959) was a British Army officer. After studying at the Royal Military Academy, Woolwich he joined the Royal Engineers on the Western Front of the First World War. Jacques received the Military Cross for actions constructing a bridge during the Hundred Days Offensive in 1918. During the Second World War Jacques served with British Indian Army units in the Burma Campaign for which he was mentioned in dispatches and appointed a Commander of the Order of the British Empire. After the war he served with the British Army of the Rhine and was appointed a Commander of the Order of the Bath shortly before his retirement in 1953.

== Early life and career ==
Leslie Innes Jacques was born on 11 December 1897 in Bristol; his father was H. I. Jacques. Jacques was educated at Clifton College before attending the Royal Military Academy, Woolwich. He graduated from Woolwich and was granted a regular commission as a second lieutenant in the Royal Engineers on 19 February 1916. Jacques attended a brief course at the Royal School of Military Engineering in Chatham, Kent, before joining the British Expeditionary Force in France where it was fighting in the First World War. He served initially with 280 Army Troops Company. Jacques was promoted to the rank of lieutenant on 19 August 1917. On 8 March 1919 he received the Military Cross "for marked gallantry and devotion to duty at Knocke, on 21st October, 1918". At the time Jacques was serving with 233rd Field Company of the Royal Engineers, during the Hundred Days Offensive. His medal citation notes that he carried out a reconnaissance of a proposed canal crossing and afterwards constructed a bridge under "very heavy" rifle and machine gun fire.

After the war Jacques served with 16 Field Company of the 2nd Queen Victoria's Own Madras Sappers and Miners in Egypt. He returned to Britain in 1921 to attend training courses at Cambridge, where he nearly lost an eye in a training accident, and Chatham. He afterwards served with 17 Field Company at Bulford Camp. On 1 November 1925 Jacques was appointed adjutant of the engineer element of the Territorial Army's 50th (Northumbrian) Division, with the temporary rank of captain. He was promoted to the substantive rank of captain eight days later. He relinquished the position of adjutant on 1 November 1929. Jacques was posted to India in 1930 for service with the Madras Sappers and Miners. He lost a finger whilst practicing bridging at Nanjangud, Mysore.

== Second World War ==
Jacques remained in the army during the Second World War, holding the rank of major in the Royal Engineers by 1941. He was promoted to lieutenant colonel on 24 September 1941. He was for a period with 10th Indian Infantry Division before serving as chief engineer of the Indian XXI Corps and then the XV Corps. For his actions in this role, controlling a large number of additional engineers assigned to the corps without any additional staff and contributing to the success of the campaign in Arakan, Burma he was recommended for an honour. The commander of XV Corps, Lieutenant-General Philip Christison, recommended Jacques for appointment as Commander of the Order of the British Empire on 10 June 1944. The recommendation was downgraded to that of Officer of the Order of the British Empire by Christison's superior and commander of the Fourteenth Army, Lieutenant-General William Slim on 20 July. Despite Slim's superior, General George Giffard, commanding 11th Army Group, agreeing with the revised recommendation on 12 September Jacques was appointed to the rank of Commander in the order for "gallant and distinguished services in Burma and on the Eastern Frontier of India" on 8 February 1945.

When Jacques reached the three-year limit for service in this rank of lieutenant colonel on 24 September 1944 he was retained, initially in a supernumerary capacity. Two days after reaching the limit he was promoted to colonel, the promotion being backdated to 20 September 1944. By February 1945 Jacques held the temporary rank of brigadier.

== Post-war ==
Jacques was mentioned in dispatches for "gallant and distinguished services in Burma" on 9 May 1946. Jacques reverted to his substantive rank of colonel and was appointed chief engineer to West Africa Command in 1948. He was retained as a supernumerary when he reached the time limit in that rank on 31 December 1949. He served for three years from 1950 in Antwerp as commander of the Engineer Services Liaison Staff of the British Army of the Rhine.

Jacques was appointed a Companion of the Order of the Bath on 1 June 1953 and retired on 12 December, receiving the honorary rank of brigadier. He remained in the Regular Army Reserve of Officers until 11 December 1955 when he reached the age limit for service. Jacques retired to Pinner, Middlesex where he lived with his sister. He suffered from ill health in his later years and died on 28 December 1959.

== Bibliography ==
- Institution of Royal Engineers (1960). "Brigadier L. I. Jacques, CB, CBE, MC" (PDF). Royal Engineers Journal. 74.
