= Peter Le Jacq =

American Catholic priest

Peter Le Jacq, MM (born December 24, 1954) is an American Catholic priest who was the special consultant to Pope John Paul II on AIDS in East Africa. He is a member of the Maryknoll Society.

== Early years and education ==
He grew up in Manhasset, New York, where he attended Saint Mary's Elementary School and Saint Mary's High School. He attended St. John's University in Queens and graduated from Cornell Medical School in 1980. He did his residency at Saint Vincent's Medical Center in New York City.

== Priesthood ==
In 1980, Le Jacq became a Maryknoll Missionary and in 1987 was ordained a priest. He has diplomas in Tropical Medicine and International Health from the Royal College of Physicians and Surgeons in England. In 1987, he received his master's degree in divinity from the Maryknoll Seminary.

Since 1984, Le Jacq has worked in Tanzania. He worked in the Serengeti from 1984 to 1986 and then Bugando Medical Center in Mwanza, Tanzania from 1987 to 1997.

In 1990, Pope John Paul II made Father Le Jacq his Special Consultant on AIDS in East Africa.

Father Le Jacq has also organized the Bugando Medical School in Tanzania through the non-profit organization known as the Touch Foundation. The Bugando University College of Health Sciences (BUCHS) is a school for Tanzanians interested in becoming health workers to better serve their community.
