= Jacques Zon =

Dutch painter

Jacques Zon (21 April 1872, The Hague – 27 March 1932, The Hague), or Jacob Abraham Zon was a Dutch painter. Zon received drawing and painting lessons from Dutch landscape painter Willem Maris. He also worked in the studio of French painter Fernand Cormon.

== Gallery ==
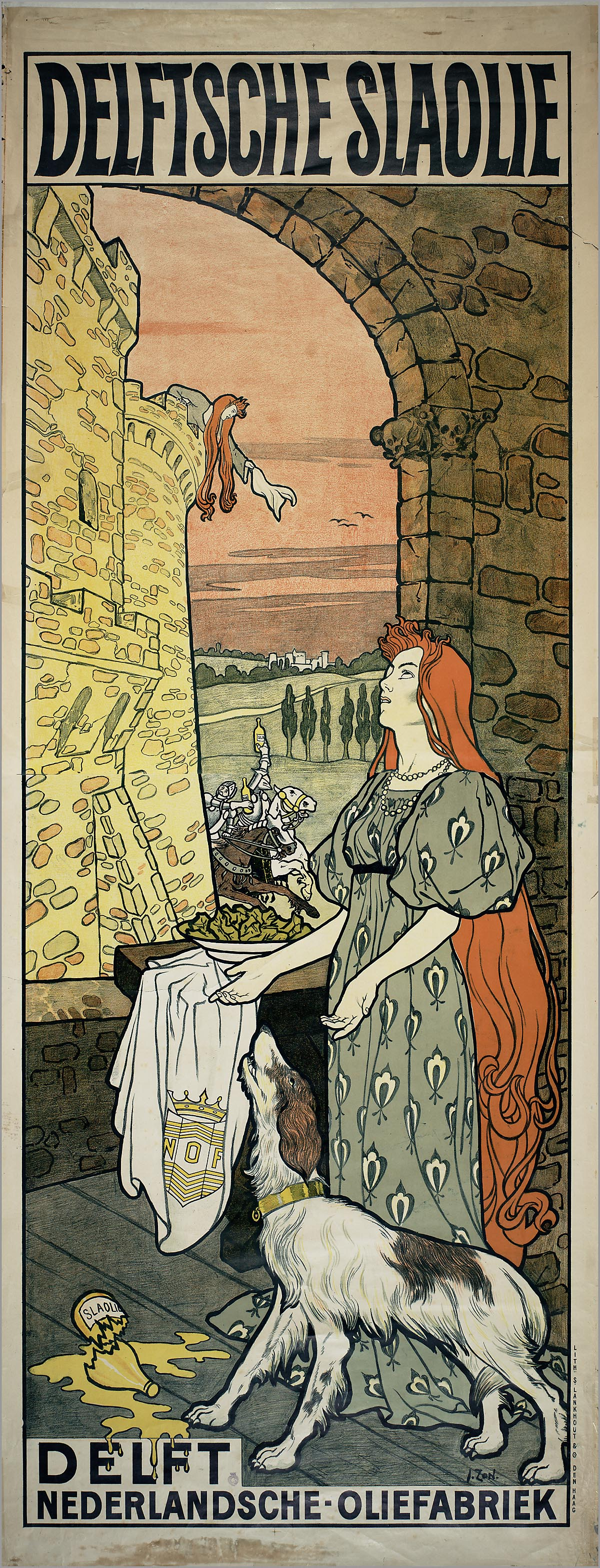

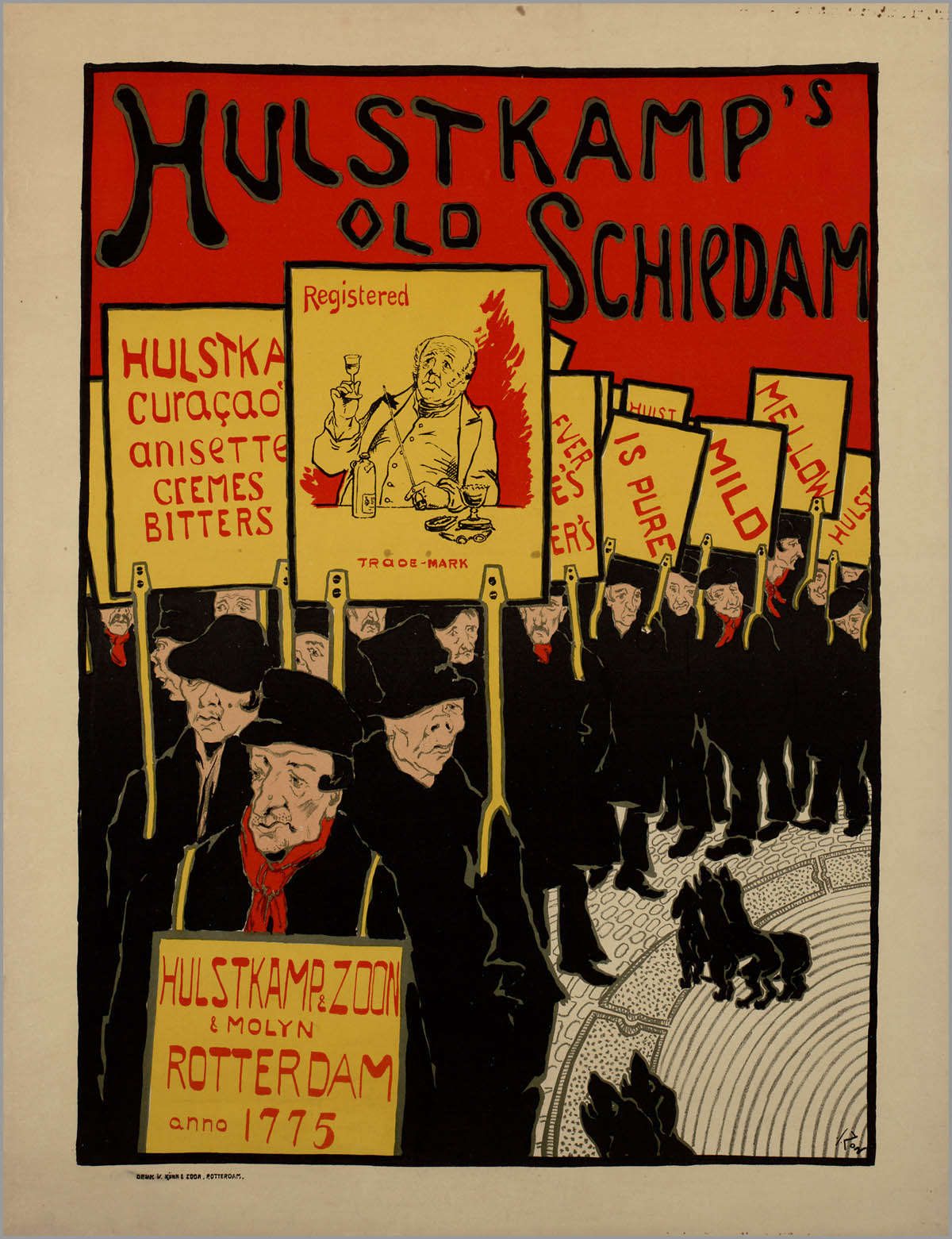

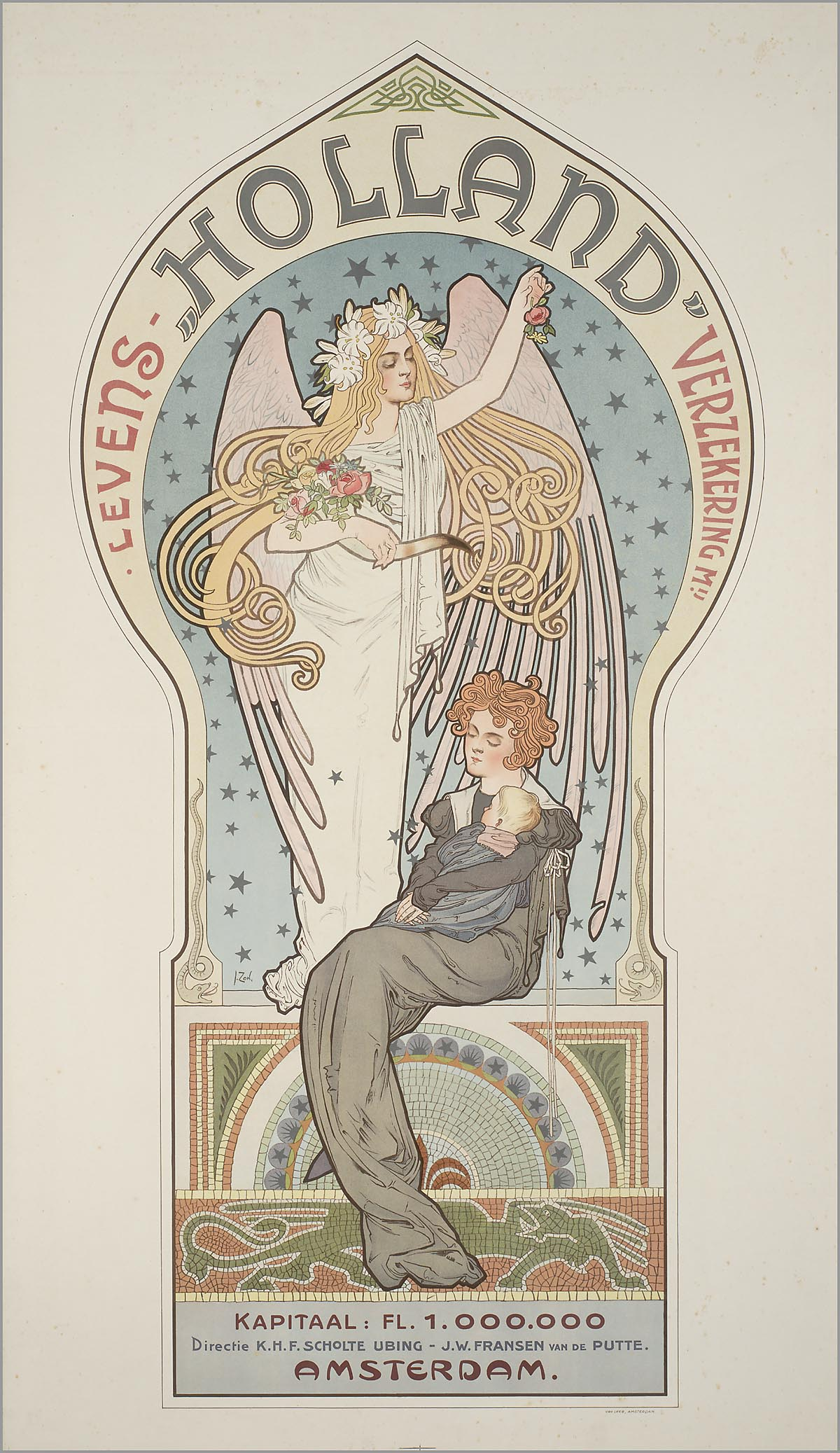

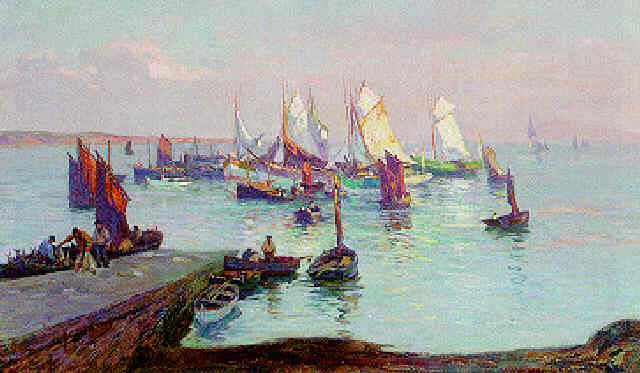

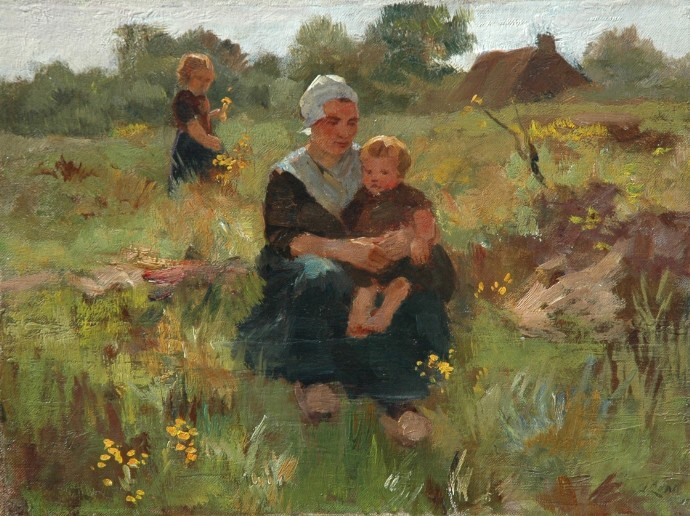
