= Samuel Jack =

Scottish footballer

Personal information
- Full name: Samuel Jack
- Date of birth: 1884
- Place of birth: Scotland
- Position: Forward

Senior career*
Years	Team	Apps	(Gls)
1905–1906	Arthurlie		
1906–1907	Third Lanark		
1907–1908	Grimsby Town	1	(0)
- * Club domestic league appearances and goals

Samuel Jack (1884 – after 1907) was a Scottish professional footballer who played as a forward.
