= Andy Jack =

Scottish footballer (1920–2004)

Personal information
- Full name: Andrew Mackenzie Jack
- Date of birth: 7 March 1920
- Place of birth: Rosemarkie, Scotland
- Date of death: 18 September 2004 (aged 84)
- Place of death: Glasgow, Scotland
- Position: Centre forward

Youth career
- Wishaw

Senior career*
Years	Team	Apps	(Gls)
1948–1949	Tranmere Rovers	3	(3)
1949	Hamilton Academical	2	(1)
- Wishaw
Total		5	(4)
- * Club domestic league appearances and goals

Andrew Mackenzie Jack (7 March 1920 – 18 September 2004) was a Scottish footballer who played as a centre forward in the Football League for Tranmere Rovers.

Jack died in Glasgow on 18 September 2004, at the age of 84.
