= John Jaques (priest) =

John Jaques (1728–1800) was a priest of the Church of England.

He was the son of Joseph Jaques of Coventry, a gentleman. Educated at Balliol College, Oxford, he graduated with a Bachelor of Arts degree in 1748 and in 1764 a Master of Arts (incorporated at Cambridge as a BA). He was ordained deacon in 1750 and in 1752, he was instituted to the Vicarage of Great Packington, Warwickshire, under the patronage of Heneage Finch, 3rd Earl of Aylesford. In 1757, he was also instituted to the Rectory of Little Packington.

Jaques became a Prebendary of Lincoln Cathedral and held the position of Rector of Little Packington for some 43 years. Jaques inherited a substantial estate from his father, the proceeds of which he liberally dispensed to the poor, and he bequeathed a large sum in his will for the establishment of a school for the poor and for dispensing bread and clothes.

He died in 1800 and is buried at Little Packington.
