= Martin Jack (footballer) =

Scottish footballer (born 1989)

Personal information
- Full name: Martin Jack
- Date of birth: 24 April 1989 (age 37)
- Place of birth: Broxburn, Scotland
- Position: Forward

Youth career
- Elgin
- 2006-2009: Inverness Caledonian Thistle
- 2008-2009: → Camelon (loan)

Senior career*
| Years | Team | Apps | (Gls) |
| 2009 | Stenhousemuir | | |
| 2009-2011 | Stranraer | 16 | (1) |
| 2010-2011 | → Bathgate Thistle (loan) | | |
| 2011-2013 | Livingston United | | |
| 2013-2014 | Stoneyburn | | |
| 2014-2015 | Bathgate Thistle | | |
- * Club domestic league appearances and goals

Martin Jack (born 24 April 1989) is a Scottish footballer who played as a forward for Stranraer.

== Playing career ==
Jack was part of the youth teams at Elgin and Inverness Caledonian Thistle. He had a loan spell at Camelon in 2008-2009 but didn't make a first team appearance for either Highland side.

He then signed for Stenhousemuir but was released in 2009 after a short spell at the Warriors.

The striker signed for Stranraer shortly after his release from Ochilview Park. He made 16 appearances for The Blues and scored his only senior goal on 25 July 2009 in a 4–2 win over Berwick Rangers.

Jack was signed for Bathgate Thistle on loan in 2010 by then manager Graeme Love.

Following his permanent departure from Stair Park, Jack had spells at Livingston United and Stoneyburn before returning to Bathgate Thistle. It proved to be a successful second spell at Thistle as he scooped the club's top goalscorer award in 2014–2015.
