= Jacqueline (given name) =

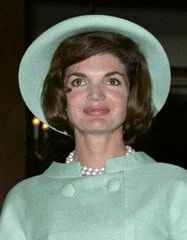
- American first lady Jacqueline Kennedy inspired namesakes.
- Pronunciation: English: /ˈdʒæklɪn/ JAK-lin; French: [ʒaklin]
- Gender: Feminine

Origin
- Origin: Hebrew through French

Other names
- Related names: Jack, Jackie, Jacklyn, Jaclyn, Jacky, Jacquelin, Jacquelyn, Jacques, Jacqui
- Popularity: see popular names

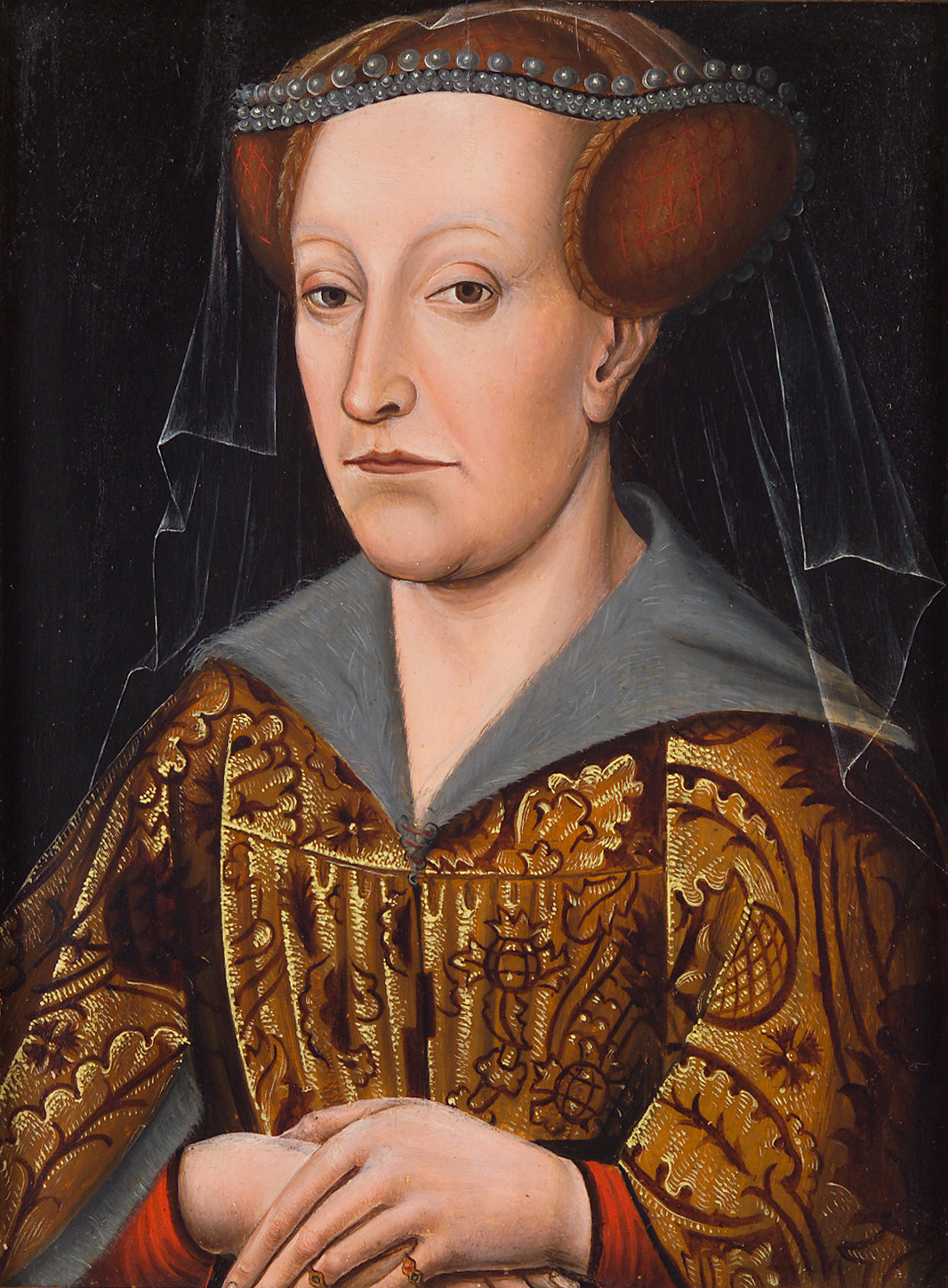
Jacqueline, Countess of Hainaut by Jan van Eyck

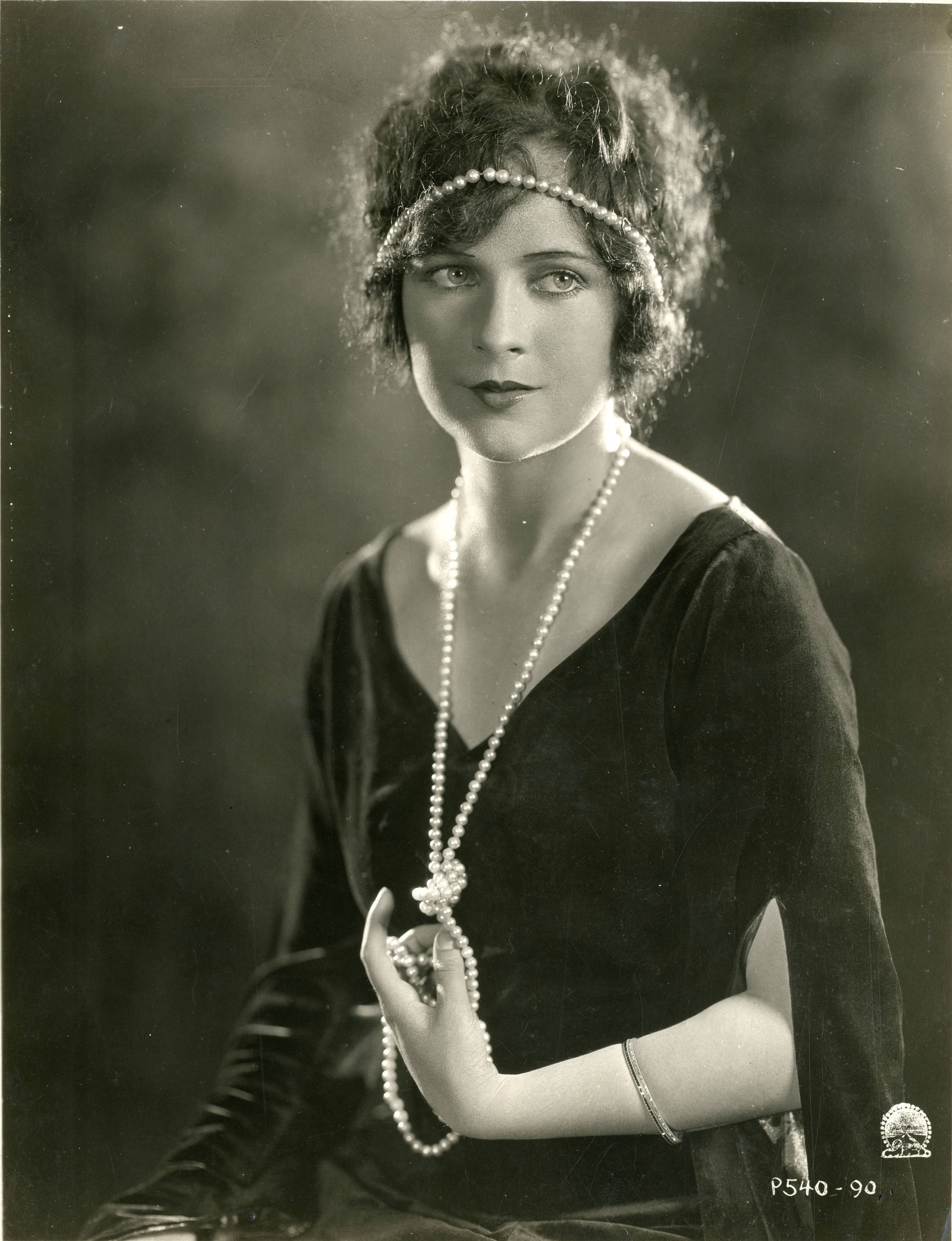
American silent film actress Jacqueline Logan

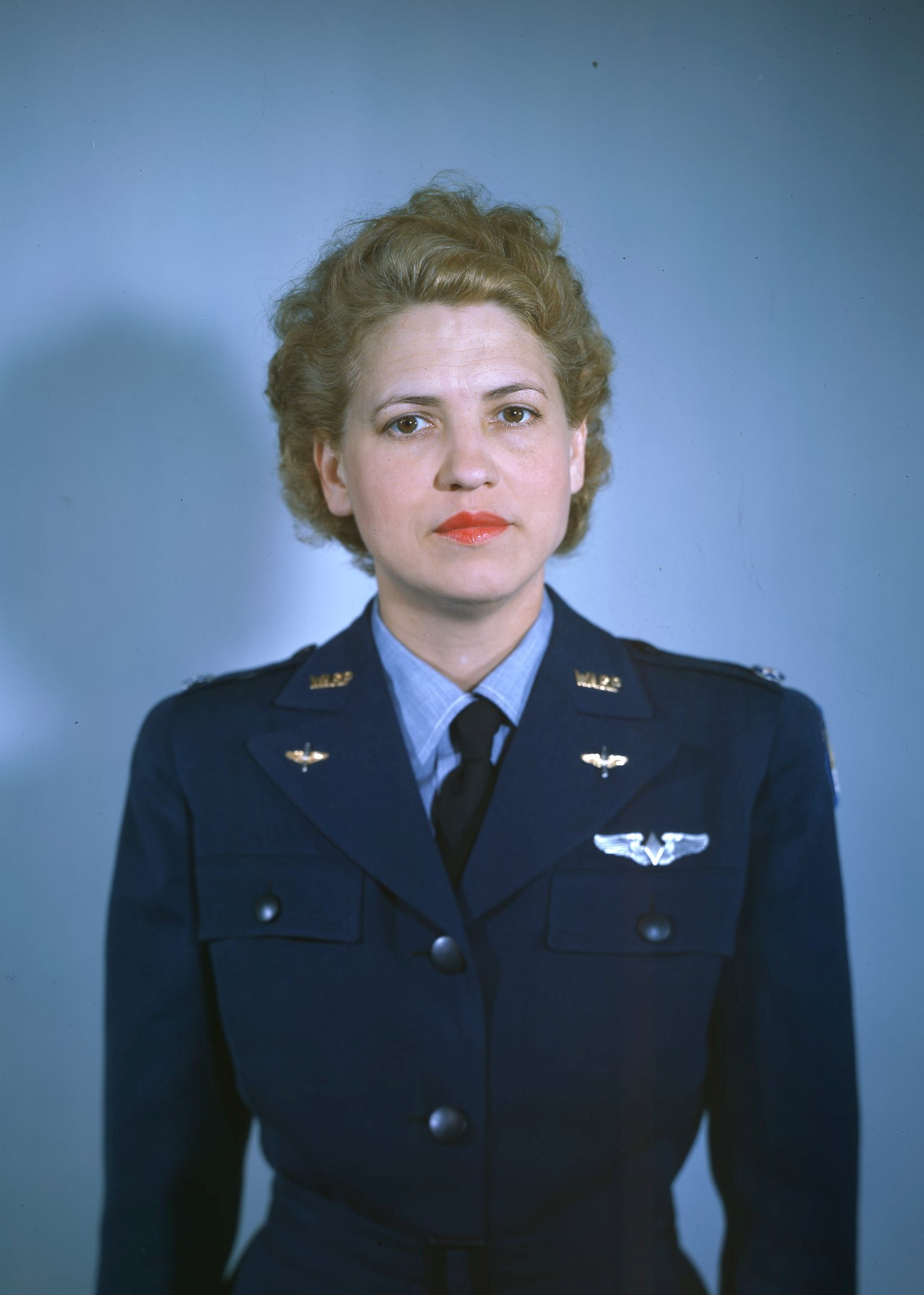
American pilot Jacqueline Cochran

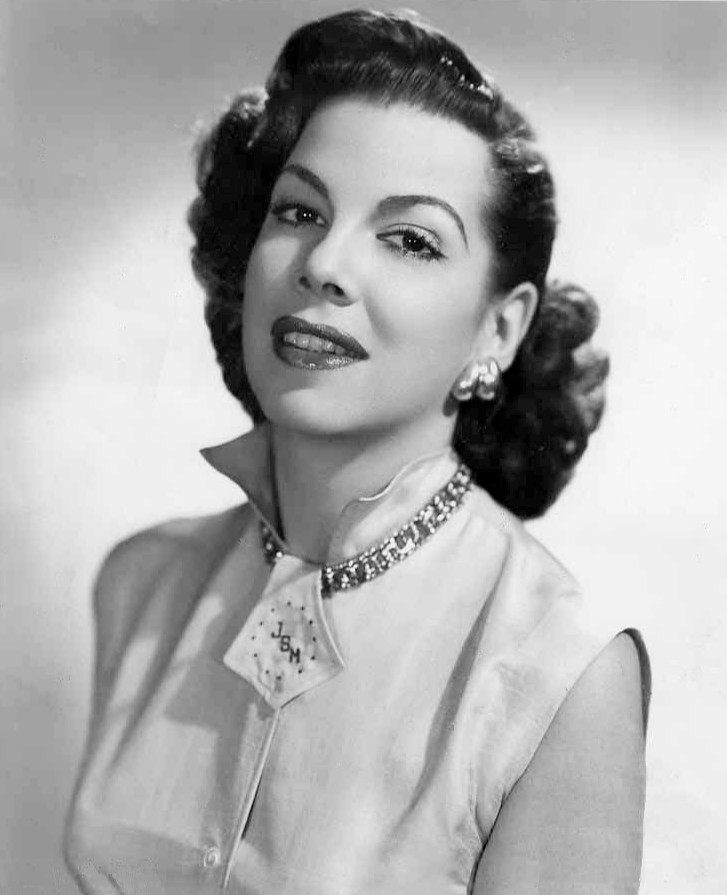
American novelist Jacqueline Susann

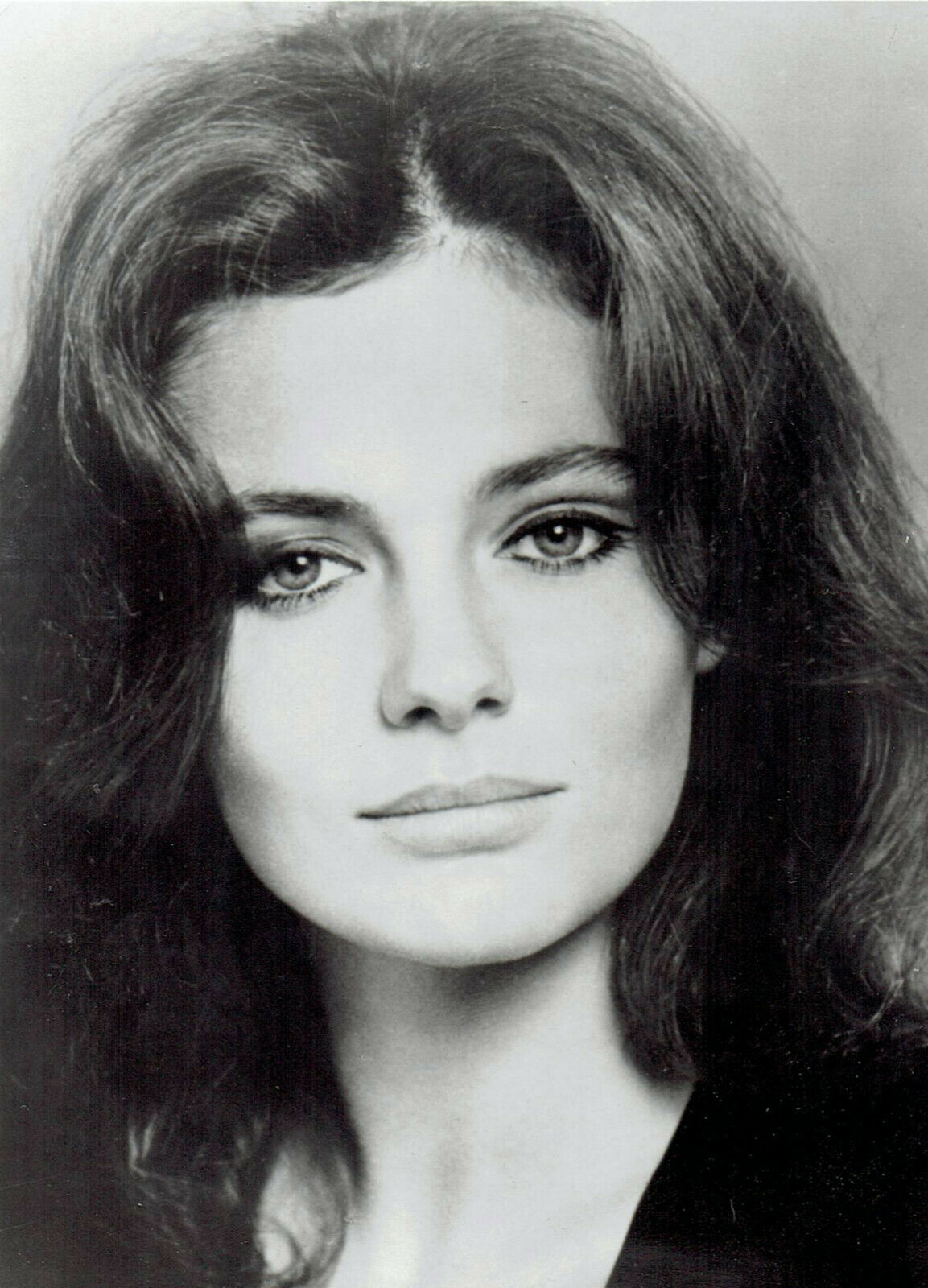
British actress Jacqueline Bisset

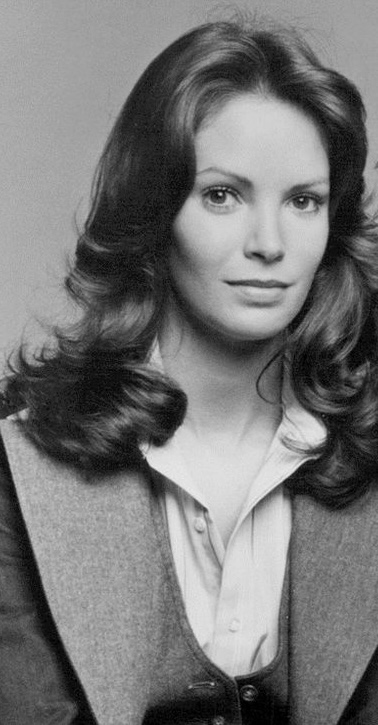
American actress Jaclyn Smith

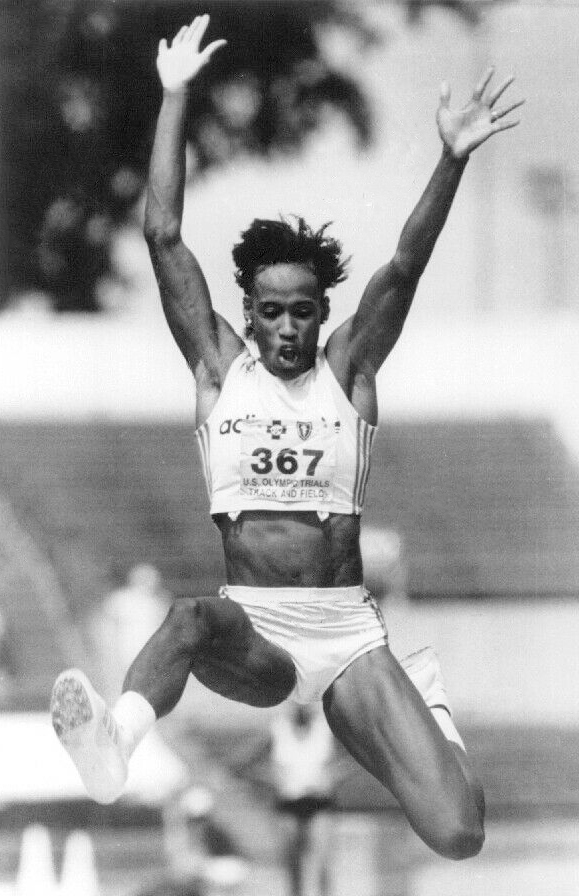
American Olympic athlete Jackie Joyner-Kersee

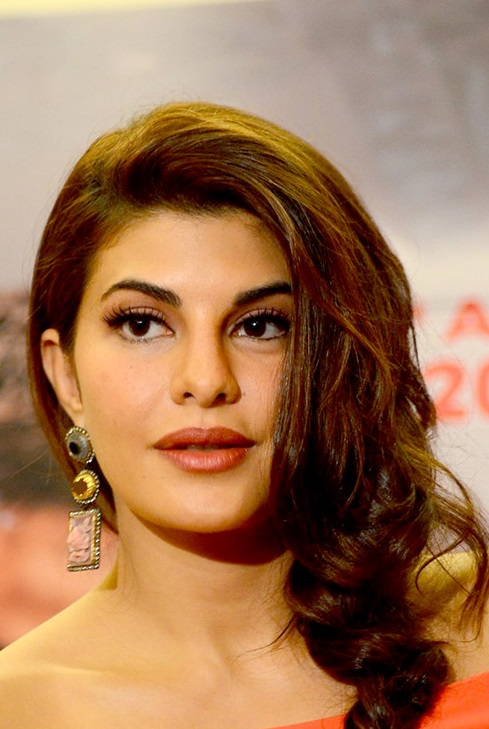
Sri Lankan actress Jacqueline Fernandez

Jacqueline is a given name, the French feminine form of Jacques, also commonly used in the English-speaking world. Older forms and variant spellings were sometimes given to men.

== Origins ==
Jacqueline comes from French, as the feminine form of Jacques (English James). Jacques originated from Jacob, which is derived from the Hebrew.

== Variant and diminutive forms ==
Many variants in both spelling and pronunciation of the name Jacqueline have come into use, such as Jacquelyn, Jacquelin, Jackeline, Jaclyn, Jakelin, Jackielyn, Jacklyn, and Jaqueline. The diminutive for Jacqueline is Jac, Jack, Jackie, Jaque or Jacqui, which also has many variants.

== American usage ==
Jacqueline, Countess of Hainaut was a famous early bearer of the name. She was the subject of the 1831 historical novel Jacqueline of Holland by Irish novelist Thomas Colley Grattan. The name was in rare, occasional use in the Southern United States in the 1800s. It first appeared among the 1,000 most used names for American newborn girls in 1898 and reached peak usage in 1950, when it was the 55th most popular name given to American girls. It was regarded by American parents as a feminine version of the name Jack.

The name then declined in use by the late 1950s, but increased again in popularity in the early 1960s due to the fame of Jacqueline Kennedy Onassis, née Jacqueline Lee Bouvier, often referred to as Jackie Kennedy following her marriage to U.S. President John F. Kennedy. The name was ranked 111th in 1959 and 37th in 1961, the year President Kennedy took office. The name also experienced another surge in popularity in 1964 following the assassination of President Kennedy on November 22, 1963, and Jackie Kennedy's display of dignity and strength as his grieving widow.

Other media influences have also inspired increased usage of the name. Usage of the spelling variant Jaclyn increased after actress Jaclyn Smith began appearing on the American television series Charlie's Angels from 1976 to 1981. Usage of the spelling variant Jacklyn increased after actress Jacklyn Zeman began appearing on the American soap opera General Hospital. Usage of the name Jacqueline increased among Hispanic and Latino Americans after it was used for a teenage character on the popular Mexican telenovela Soñadoras, which was also widely viewed in the United States.

== World usage ==
Jacqueline has also been a popular first name in Australia, Brazil, Canada, the United Kingdom, France, Germany, Ireland, Mexico, New Zealand, South Africa, Spain, and elsewhere. While the popularity of the name and its variants has declined worldwide, it remains in regular use.

== Transliterations ==
- Amharic: ጃክሊን (Jakilīni)
- Arabic: جاكلين
- Armenian: Ժագլին, Ժաքլինը (Zhak’liny)
- Bangla: জ্যাকুলিন (Jyākulina)
- Bulgarian: Жаклин, Zhaklina
- Simplified Chinese: Jiékuílín, 杰奎琳
- Traditional Chinese: Jiékuílín, 賈桂琳
- Cantonese: 積琦蓮
- Croatian: Jaklina
- Czech: Jakubka, Jakuba
- Danish: Jacobine, Bine, Iben
- Dutch: Jacoba, Jacobina, Jacobine, Coba, Jacomina
- French: Jacquette, Jacquetta, Jacqui, Jacquine, Jaquette
- Galician: Xaquelina
- Georgian: ჟაკლინ (Zhaklin)
- Greek: Iakovina (Ιακωβινα)
- Gujarati: Jēkvēlina (જેક્વેલિન)
- Hebrew: ז'קלין, ג'קלין, ג'קי
- Hindi: Jaikalina, जैकलिन
- Hungarian: Zsaklin
- Italian: Giachetta, Giacomina, Giacoma
- Irish: Séamaisíona, Seacailín, Siacailín
- Japanese: Jakurīn (ジャクリーン)
- Kannada: Jākvelin, ಜಾಕ್ವೆಲಿನ್
- Korean: Jaekeullin, 재클린
- Latin: Iacoba
- Lithuanian: Žaklina
- Macedonian: Жаклина (Quaklin)
- Malayalam: ജാക്വലിൻ (Jākvalin)
- Marathi: जॅकलिन (Jĕkalina)
- Mongolian: Жаклин (Jaklin)
- Nepali: जैकलिन (Jaikalina)
- Polish: Jakubina, Żaklina, Żaklin
- Persian: ژاکلین
- Portuguese: Jaqueline
- Punjabi: Jaikalīna, ਜੈਕਲੀਨ
- Russian: Zhaklin, Яковина, Якубина, Жаклин
- Serbian: Жаклина, Žaklin
- Scottish: Jamesina
- Spanish: Jacoba
- Tamil: Jākkuliṉ, ஜாக்குலின், Jākki ஜாக்கி
- Telugu: Jākvelin, జాక్వెలిన్, Jākī జాకీ
- Thai: Cæ̆kh ke x līn, แจ๊คเกอลีน
- Ukrainian: Zhaklin, Жаклін
- Welsh: Jacelin
- Yiddish: Jaklin, דזשאַקלין, Jackye דזשאַקקיע

== Notable people ==
=== Television, stage, and film ===
- Jacqueline Beer (born 1932), former actress and present chair of the Board of Directors of the Thor Heyerdahl Research Centre
- Jacqueline Bisset (born 1944), British actress
- Jacqueline Boatswain (born 1962), English actress
- Jacqueline Bracamontes (born 1979), Mexican actress
- Jackie Brambles (born 1967), British television presenter
- Jacqueline Brookes (1930–2013), American stage actress
- Jacqueline Fernandez (born 1985), Bahraini–Sri Lankan actress and model
- Jacqueline Ellen Last O'Neil Henderson (born 1975), Australian radio host known as "Jackie O"
- Jacqueline "Jackie" Emerson, American actress
- Jacqueline (Jackée) Harry (born 1956), American actress
- Jacqueline Hennessy (born 1968), Canadian actress and singer
- Jacqueline Hill (1929–1993), British actress
- Jacqueline Jossa (born 1992), English actress
- Jacqueline Kim, Korean-American actress best known for the role of Lao Ma in the television series Xena: Warrior Princess
- Jacqueline Laurence (1932–2024), French-born Brazilian actress and theatre director
- Jacqueline Leonard, Scottish actress
- Jacqueline Lentzou (born 1989), Greek film director
- Jacqueline Logan (1902–1983), American silent film actress
- Jacqueline McKenzie (born 1967), Australian actress
- Jacquelyn Mills, Canadian documentary filmmaker
- Jacqueline Obradors (born 1966), American actress
- Jacqueline Pagnol (1920–2016), French actress
- Jacqueline Pearce (1943–2018), British actress
- Jacqueline Pillon (born 1977), voice actress best known for the role of Matthew in the PBS cartoon series CyberChase
- Jacqueline Royaards-Sandberg (1876–1976), Dutch actress
- Jacqueline Scott (1931–2020), American actress
- Jaclyn Smith (born 1945), American actress and businesswoman
- Jacqueline Toboni (born 1992), American actress
- Jacqueline Wu (born 1968), Hong Kong actress

=== Sports ===
- Jacqueline Batteast (born 1983), US basketball player
- Jacqueline Delord (born 1970), French swimmer
- Jackie Silva (born 1962), Brazilian beach volleyball player
- Jackie Gayda (born 1981), American semi-retired professional wrestler
- Jackie Joyner-Kersee (born 1962), American retired track and field athlete
- Jacqueline Moore (born 1964), American semi-retired professional wrestler
- Jacqueline Owusu (born 2002), Ghanaian footballer
- Jacqueline Perkins (runner) (born 1965), Australian long-distance runner
- Jacquie Phelan (born 1955), American professional mountain bike champion
- Jacqueline Pusey (born 1959), Jamaican sprint athlete
- Jacqueline Todten (born 1954), German javelin thrower

=== Literature ===
- Jacqueline Bishop, Jamaican writer, visual artist and photographer
- Jacqueline Briskin (1927–2014), writer
- Jacqueline "Jackie" French (born 1953), Australian children's writer
- Jacqueline Jackson (born 1944), author and peace activist
- Jacqueline Susann (1918–1974), American writer
- Jacqueline Wilson (born 1945), English novelist
- Jacqueline Woodson (born 1963), American writer

=== Music ===
- Jacqueline Boyer (born 1941), French singer and actress
- Jacqueline "Jacky" Clark Chisholm (born 1948), American singer
- Jacqueline du Pré (1945–1987), British cellist
- Jacqueline Marie "Jackie" Evancho (born 2000), American classical crossover singer
- Jacqueline Govaert (born 1982), Dutch singer
- Jacqueline Lemay (1937–2026), Canadian singer-songwriter and guitarist
- Jacqueline Sagana (born 1984), known as Jackie Sagana, Spanish R&B singer
- Jacqueline Taïeb (born 1948), French singer

=== Science ===
- Jacqueline Barton (born 1952), American chemist
- Jacqueline Beggs (born 1962), New Zealand entomologist and ecologist
- Jacqueline Chen, American applied mathematician and mechanical engineer
- Jacqueline Coutras (born 1942), French geographer, CNRS researcher, and pioneer of gender geography in France
- Jacqueline Dewar, American mathematician
- Jacqueline Ferrand, (1918–2014), French mathematician
- Jacqueline Ficini (1923–1988), French researcher and professor of chemistry
- Jacqueline McGlade (born 1955), British-born Canadian environmental scientist
- Jacqueline Noonan (1928–2020), American pediatric cardiologist
- Jacqueline Verdeau-Paillès (1924–2010), French neuropsychiatrist, music therapist

=== Government and politics ===
- Jacquelyn Domaingue, American politician
- Jackie Jones (born 1966), Welsh politician
- Jacqueline Kennedy Onassis, (1929–1994), widow of US President John F. Kennedy and Aristotle Onassis
- Jacqueline Panis (born 1948), French politician
- Jacqueline Perkins (diplomat), British diplomat and ambassador
- Jacqueline de Quattro (born 1960), Swiss politician
- Jaqueline Rauschkolb (born 1987), German politician
- Jaqueline Sabao (born 1975), Zambian politician
- Jacqui Smith (born 1962), British politician, former Home Secretary

=== Other people ===
- Jacqueline, Countess of Hainaut (1401–1436)
- Jacqueline Felice de Almania (fl. 1322), Italian physician
- Jacqueline Auriol, (1917–2000), French aviator
- Jacqueline Bishop, Jamaican writer, visual artist and photographer
- Jacqueline Bracamontes, beauty pageant titleholder
- Jacqueline Cochran (1906–1980), American aviator and business executive, first woman pilot to break the sound barrier and head of the Women Airforce Service Pilots for part of World War II
- Jacqueline de Jong (1939–2024), Dutch painter, sculptor and graphic artist
- Jakelin de Mailly, a Frankish knight (male) who took part in the Battle of Cresson in 1187
- Jacqueline Aguilera Marcano (born 1976), 1995 Miss World representative of Venezuela
- Jacqueline Ripstein, Mexican artist
- Jacqueline Saburido, victim and survivor of a high-profile drunk-driving incident
- Jackie Stallone (1921–2020), American astrologer, mother of actor Sylvester Stallone and singer Frank Stallone
- Jacqueline Thomas (1945–1961), victim in a high-profile 1960s English murder case
- Jakelin Troy (born 1960), Australian linguist
- Jacqueline Grennan Wexler (1926–2012), American Roman Catholic nun and university president
- Jacqueline Winsor (1941–2024), Newfoundland-born American sculptor
- Jakelin Caal (2011–2018), Guatemalan immigrant child who died while under the care of US border control

== Fictional characters ==
- Jacqueline Ingrid Bouvier, TV cartoon character on The Simpsons
- Jacqueline Beulah Burkhart, character from That '70s Show
- Jacqueline "Jacqui" Bernadette McQueen, character from the long-running soap opera Hollyoaks
- Jacqueline Natla, main antagonist and final boss from Tomb Raider video games
- Jacqueline Andrea Suzette Tyler, a character from the 2005 Doctor Who television series
- Jacqueline Payne Marone, character from The Bold and the Beautiful
- Jackie Wilcox, character from the TV series Heroes
- Jacqueline Falsworth-Crichton, comic book character
- Jacquelyn Scieszka, a character in the TV adaptation of A Series of Unfortunate Events

== See also ==
- Jacqui
- Jackie
- Jackeline
- Jaclyn
