= Jackie (given name) =

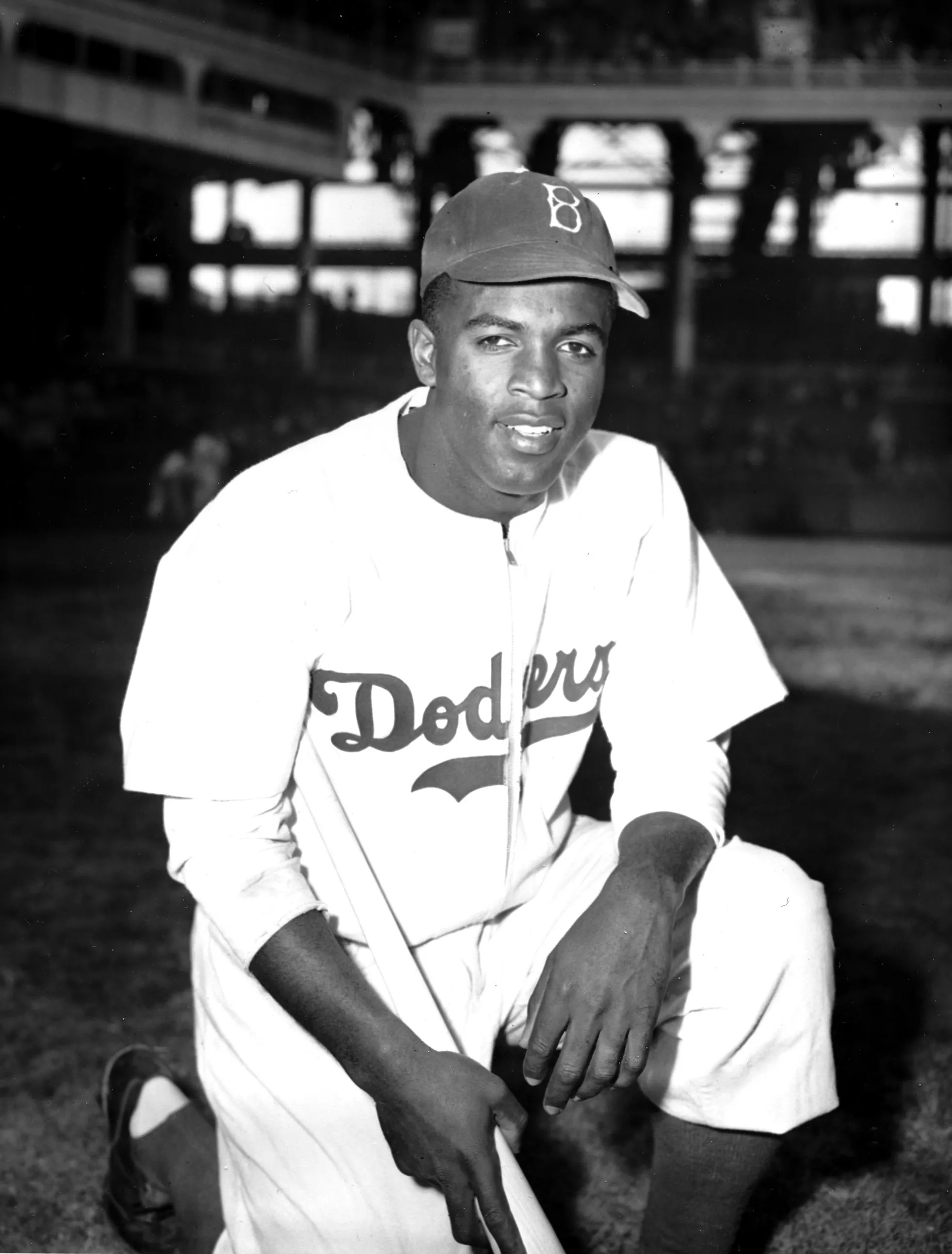
- Jackie Robinson in 1947
- Pronunciation: /dʒæki/
- Gender: Unisex
- Language: English

Origin
- Languages: English, French, Hebrew
- Origin: 1. Jack; 2. John; 3. Jacob; 4. Jacques; 5. Jacqueline; 6. Jackson

Other names
- Variant forms: Jacky, Jacki
- Related names: Jacqui, Jacqueline, Jack, Jackson, John, Jaclyn, Jacques, Jacob, Jaki, Jacquetta

Jackie or Jacky is a given name or nickname for both males and females, often a pet form of Jack or other names.

== People ==
=== Men ===
- Jackie Bradley Jr. (born 1990), American Major League Baseball player
- Jackie Chan (born 1954), Hong Kong martial artist, actor, film director, producer, stuntman, and singer.
- Jacky Cheung (born 1961), Hong Kong singer-songwriter and actor
- John Jackie Cooper (1922–2011), American actor and TV producer
- Jackie Davis (1920–1999), American jazz singer, organist and bandleader
- Jacky Duguépéroux (born 1948), French football manager and former player
- Jacky Durand (born 1967), French retired road bicycle racer
- Jacques Fatton (1925–2011), Swiss footballer
- Jackie Fields (born Jacob Finkelstein, 1908–1984), American world and Olympic champion boxer
- John Fisher, 1st Baron Fisher (1841–1920), British admiral
- Jackie Earle Haley (born 1961), American actor
- John Jackie Gleason (1916–1987), American comedian and actor
- Jacques Jacky Ickx (born 1945), Belgian racing driver
- Jacky Ido (born 1977), Burkinabe-born French actor
- Jackie Lee (country singer) (born 1991), American country music singer-songwriter
- Jack Jacky Lee (1938–2016), American Football League and National Football League quarterback
- Jacques Lemée (born 1946), French retired football player and manager
- John Jackie Lomax (1944–2013), English singer-songwriter and guitarist
- Jackie Mason, American comedian and actor born Yacov Moshe Maza (1928–2021)
- Jacky Mathijssen (born 1963), Dutch football manager and former player
- Jackie Milburn, (1924–1988) English football player
- Jacques Jacky Munaron (born 1956), Belgian former football goalkeeper
- John Jackie McLean (1931–2006), American saxophonist and composer
- John Jackie McNamara Sr. (born 1952), Scottish retired footballer
- Jackie McNamara (born 1973), Scottish footballer, son of the above
- Jacky Planchard (born 1947), French retired football player and manager
- Jack Jackie Robinson (1919–1972), American Hall-of-Fame baseball player who broke the color barrier in Major League Baseball
- Robert Lloyd Jackson Jackie Robinson (basketball, born 1927), American basketball player in the 1948 Summer Olympics
- Jackie Robinson (basketball, born 1955), American professional basketball player
- John Jackie Robinson (footballer) (1917–1972), British footballer who played for Sheffield Wednesday and Sunderland
- Jackie Shroff (born 1957), Indian film actor
- Jackie Robinson (musician), Jamaican singer and lead vocalist with The Pioneers
- John Jackie Stewart (born 1939), Scottish racing driver
- Jackie Vernon (born Ralph Verrone, 1924–1987), American comedian and actor who voiced Frosty the Snowman in two animated TV specials
- Jackie Wallace (born 1951), American professional football player
- Jack Jackie Wilson (1934–1984), American soul singer-songwriter and performer

=== Women ===
- Jackie Burns (born 1980), American actress and singer
- Jackie Lou Blanco (born 1964), Filipina actress
- Jackie Brambles, British journalist, radio DJ and television presenter
- Jacqueline Jackie Burroughs, English-born Canadian actress
- Jacky Cullum Chisholm, American gospel singer born Jacqueline Cullum (born 1948)
- Jackie Coakley, University of Virginia student behind false rape allegations in retracted Rolling Stone article "A Rape on Campus"
- Jacqueline Jackie Collins (1937–2015), British romance novelist
- Jackie Davis (writer) (born 1963), New Zealand author, poet, and playwright
- Jackie DeShannon, American singer-songwriter
- Jackie Dunbar, Scottish politician
- Jacqueline Jackie Emerson, American actress and singer
- Jacqueline Jackie Evancho (born 2000), American classical crossover singer
- Jackie Fielder, American politician
- Jacky Fleming (born 1955), cartoonist
- Jackie Francois, American Christian musician
- Jacqueline Jackie French (born 1953), Australian author
- Jacquelyn Jackie Gayda, American wrestler
- Jackie Gonzaga (born 1994), Filipina dancer and actress
- Jackie Guerrido, Puerto Rican television weather forecaster and journalist
- Jaclyn Jackie Hamwey (born 1989), American para snowboarding athlete
- Coach Jackie J (born 2002), American social media personality
- Jackie Jones, British politician
- Jacqueline Jackie Joyner-Kersee, American track and field athlete
- Jackie Kabler (born 1970), British newsreader
- Jackie Kashian, American stand-up comedian
- Jacqueline Kennedy Onassis (1929–1994), American wife of President John F. Kennedy and Greek shipping magnate Aristotle Onassis, and fashion icon
- Jackie Lee (Irish singer), born Jacqueline Flood in 1936
- Jacqueline Jackie Loughery, first winner of the Miss USA competition
- Jackie Maxwell (born 1956), Canadian theatre director
- Jackie Peng (born 1998), Canadian chess player
- Jackie Rice (born 1990), Filipina actress and singer
- Jackie Saccoccio (1963–2020), American abstract painter
- Jacqueline Jackie Stallone, American astrologer, dancer and wrestling promoter
- Jackie Trent (1940–2015), English singer-songwriter and actress born Yvonne Burgess
- Jackie Wolcott, American diplomat
- Jackie Yi-Ru Ying (born 1966), Taiwanese-born American scientist

== Fictional characters ==
- Jackie Aprile Sr, a character from The Sopranos
- Jackie Aprile Jr., a character from The Sopranos
- Jackie (Cyberchase), a cartoon character on Cyberchase
- Jacqueline Ingrid Bouvier, TV cartoon character on The Simpsons
- Jacky Bryant, in the video game series Virtua Fighter
- Jackie Burkhart, on the TV series That '70s Show
- Jackie Chiles, on the TV sitcom Seinfeld
- Jackie Cook, on the TV series Veronica Mars
- Jackie Hopper, on the British TV series The Story of Tracy Beaker (series 3–5)
- Jack Rafferty, nicknamed Jackie Boy, in Frank Miller's Sin City

== See also ==
- Jackie (disambiguation)
- Jacki, a given name
- Jacqui, a given name
