= Jacquelin =

Jacquelin is a name. Originally male, it is now mostly female, similar to Jacqueline.

== List of people with the given name ==
- Jacquelin de Ferrière, 13th century French knight
- Jacquelin Holzman (born 1935), Canadian politician, mayor of Ottawa
- Jacquelin Magnay, Australian journalist
- Jacquelin Martin, wife of Al Molinaro
- Jacquelin Maycumber, American politician
- Jacquelin Perry (1918–2013), American physician
- Jacquelin Perske, TV writer
- Jacquelin Smith Cooley (1883–1965), American botanist and pathologist

== List of people with the surname ==
- E. Jacquelin Dietz, American statistician
- Edmond Jacquelin (1875–1928), French cyclist
- Émilien Jacquelin (born 1995), French biathlete
- Françoise-Marie Jacquelin (1602–1645), Acadian heroine
- Jacques-André Jacquelin (1776–1827), French poet
- Lawrence Jacquelin (1923–1992), American NASCAR driver
- Marguerite Jacquelin (1850s–1941), French painter
- Raphaël Jacquelin (born 1974), French golfer

== See also ==
- Jacqueline (disambiguation)
