= Sandberg =

Sandberg may refer to:

== People ==
- Sandberg (surname)

== Places ==
- Sandberg, Bavaria - municipality in the district of Rhön-Grabfeld in Bavaria in Germany
- Sandberg (Celtic settlement) - archaeological site on hill ridge in the northwestern part of the Weinviertel region of Lower Austria
- Sandberg, California - post office and small surrounding community in Southern California in the United States

== See also ==
- Sandburg
- Zandberg (disambiguation)
