= Jackie =

Jackie or Jacky may refer to:

== People and fictional characters ==
- Jackie (given name), a list of people and fictional characters named Jackie or Jacky
  - Jackie, current ring name of female professional wrestler Jacqueline Moore
  - Jackie Lee (Irish singer) (born 1936), also known as "Jacky"
  - Sagar Alias Jacky, Indian film character
- Jarrhan Jacky (born 1989), Australian rules football player

== Arts and entertainment ==
=== Film and television ===
- Jackie (1921 film), directed by John Ford
- Jacky (film), a 2000 Dutch film
- Jackie (2010 film), an Indian Kannada -language film directed by Kannada director Soori
- Jackie (2012 film), a Dutch film
- Jackie (2016 film), a biographical drama about Jackie Kennedy
- "Jackie" (Suspect), a 2022 television episode

=== Music ===
==== Albums ====
- Jackie (Jackie DeShannon album) (1972)
- Jackie (Ciara album) (2015)
- Jacky (album), a 2006 album by Joker Xue

==== Songs ====
- "Jacky" (Jacques Brel song) (1965)
- "Jackie" (Elisa Fiorillo song) (1987)
- "Jackie", a song from the 1987 album The Lion and the Cobra by Sinéad O'Connor
- “Jackie”, a song from the 1993 rap album KKKill the Fetus by Esham
- "Jackie", a song from the 2000 album Mass Romantic by The New Pornographers
- "Jacky", a 2000 song by To Rococo Rot
- "The Jackie", a 2021 song by Bas and J. Cole

==== Radio ====
- 107.8 Radio Jackie, a London radio station.

== Animals ==
- Jackie (dog), a Finnish dog, trained to mimic the Nazi salute, that caused a 1941 controversy
- Jackie (c. 1915–1935), the second MGM Studio lion and the first to be heard roaring, used from 1928 to 1956
- Jacky dragon (Amphibolurus muricatus), a lizard
- Jackie (c. 2012–2026), a bald eagle from California

== Other uses ==
- Jackie (magazine), a British teen magazine

== See also ==
- Jackie O (disambiguation)
- Jacqui, a similar given name
