= Kundmann =

Kundmann is a surname. Notable people with the surname include:

- Carl Kundmann (1838–1919), Austrian sculptor
- Johanna Kundmann (1914–2000), Austrian lawyer and judge
