= Handberg =

Handberg is a surname. Notable people with the surname include:

- Gert Handberg (born 1969), Danish motorcycle speedway rider
- Linnéa Handberg Lund (born 1976), Danish musician

== See also ==
- Sandberg (surname)
