= Jacklyn =

Jacklyn may refer to:

== People ==
- Jacklyn Frank, Antiguan and Barbudan politician first elected in 2017
- Jacklyn H. Lucas (1928–2008), American World War II Marine awarded the Medal of Honor
- Jacky Rosen (born 1957), American politician
- Jackie Trad (born 1972), Australian former politician
- Jacklyn Wu (born 1968), Taiwanese actress and singer
- Jacklyn Zeman (1953–2023), American actress
- Robert Jacklyn (1922–2014), Australian physicist

== Other uses ==
- Jacklyn (LPV1), the Landing Platform Vessel 1, a barge owned by Blue Origin, planned to be used as a landing platform for New Glenn booster stages
- Jacklyn (ship), the Landing Platform Vessel, a ship owned by Blue Origin from 2018–2022, which was named Jacklyn only from 2020 until it was scrapped in 2022, anticipated for use as a landing platform for New Glenn rockets
- Mount Jacklyn, part of the Athos Range, Mac. Robertson Land, Antarctica

== See also ==
- Jaclyn, a feminine given name
- Jacqueline (disambiguation)
