= Jackeline =

Jakeline
- Pronunciation: Jack-lin
- Gender: Female

Origin
- Origin: Hebrew
- Meaning: "Supplanter" / "May God protect"

Other names
- Related names: Jacqueline, Jackie

Jackeline is a feminine given name. It is variant of Jacqueline, a French feminine form of Jacques which in turn comes from Jacob, a Hebrew name meaning "supplanter" or possibly "may God protect".

== Notable people with this name ==
- Jackeline Estevez, popular female singer in the Dominican Republic
- Jackeline Olivier (born 1977), Brazilian actress
- Jackeline Rentería (born 1986), female wrestler from Colombia
- Jackeline Rodríguez (born 1972), the official representative of Venezuela to Miss Universe 1991

== See also ==
- Jackie (given name)
- Jackline
- Jacqueline (given name)
