= Jaki =

Jaki is a given name and a surname which may refer to:

- John Jaki Byard (1922–1999), American jazz pianist, composer and arranger
- Jacqueline Jaki Graham (born 1956), British R&B singer-songwriter
- Jaki Liebezeit (1938–2017), German drummer
- Jaki Numazawa, ring name of Japanese professional wrestler Naoki Fukui (born 1977)
- Patryk Jaki (born 1985), Polish politician
- Stanley Jaki (1924–2009), Hungarian-born American Roman Catholic priest, historian and philosopher
- Jaki Manu, a character in the New Zealand soap opera Shortland Street

== See also ==
- Jackie (given name)
- Jacqui
