= Zandberg =

Zandberg, a variant of "Sandberg', means "Sand Mountain". It may refer to:

== Places ==
In the Netherlands:

- Zandberg, Gelderland
- Zandberg, Groningen-Drenthe
- Zandberg, North Brabant, a neighbourhood of Breda
- Zandberg, Zeeland

== See also ==
- Zandberg (surname)
