= Ostermiller =

Ostermiller is a surname. Notable people with the surname include:

- Dan Ostermiller (born 1956), American sculptor
- Jeremy Ostermiller, American entrepreneur and business executive
