= Sandberg (surname) =

Sandberg is a Swedish surname, meaning "Sand Mountain". Zandberg is a variant spelling.

== Geographical distribution ==
As of 2014, 46.4% of all known bearers of the surname Sandberg were residents of Sweden (frequency 1:540), 30.7% of the United States (1:29,945), 6.6% of Norway (1:1,976), 4.6% of Finland (1:3,032), 4.3% of Denmark (1:3,354), 2.2% of Canada (1:41,674) and 1.2% of Germany (1:167,842).

In Sweden, the frequency of the surname was higher than national average (1:540) in the following counties:

1. Norrbotten County (1:211)
2. Västerbotten County (1:353)
3. Jönköping County (1:399)
4. Örebro County (1:433)
5. Västmanland County (1:449)
6. Södermanland County (1:468)
7. Östergötland County (1:482)
8. Halland County (1:540)

In Norway, the frequency of the surname was higher than national average (1:1,976) in the following regions:

1. Eastern Norway (1:1,403)
2. Northern Norway (1:1,747)
3. Trøndelag (1:1,940)

In Finland, the frequency of the surname was higher than national average (1:3,032) in the following regions:

1. Åland (1:505)
2. Ostrobothnia (1:649)
3. Satakunta (1:1,351)
4. Uusimaa (1:2,177)
5. Tavastia Proper (1:2,571)
6. Southwest Finland (1:2,624)

== People ==
- Anders Sandberg, Swedish researcher, science debater, futurist, and author
- Andy Sandberg, American director, writer, actor, and producer
- Ann Linnea Sandberg (1938–2009), American immunologist
- Ann-Sofie Sandberg (born 1951), Swedish food scientist
- Artie Sandberg, American professional football player in the National Football League
- A. W. Sandberg (1887–1938), Danish film director and screenwriter
- Birte Sandberg (born 1965), Swedish politician
- Christina Sandberg, Swedish tennis player
- Eliezer Sandberg, former Israeli politician
- Emily Sandberg, American model and actress
- Erling Sandberg (1879–1956), Norwegian appointed councillor of state
- Eric Sandberg (1884–1966), Swedish sailor who competed in the 1908 Summer Olympics
- Eva Sandberg, Jewish German photographer who took Soviet citizenship
- Gösta Sandberg (1932–2006), Swedish footballer, icehockey and bandy player
- Gunnar Sandberg, Swedish Social Democratic politician
- Gustav Sandberg (1888–1958), Swedish football (soccer) player
- Harald Sandberg Swedish diplomat and civil servant
- Henrik Sandberg Danish film producer
- Inger and Lasse Sandberg, Swedish authors of children's books
- Jacqueline Royaards-Sandberg (1876–1976), Dutch stage actress
- Jared Sandberg, American Major League Baseball third baseman
- Kristin Sandberg, Norwegian football player and World Champion.
- Louise Sandberg, Danish born fashion designer based in London UK
- Martin Sandberg, Swedish music producer
- Michael Sandberg, Executive Chairman of The Hong Kong and Shanghai Banking
- Mikael Sandberg, Swedish ice hockey goaltender
- Mordecai Sandberg Canadian composer and physician
- Niklas Sandberg, Swedish footballer
- Niklas Sandberg, Norwegian footballer
- Ole Marius Sandberg, Norwegian jazz musician
- Olga Sandberg, Swedish ballerina
- Per Sandberg (born 1960), Norwegian politician and a member of the Progress Party (FRP)
- Rasmus Sandberg (born 2001), Norwegian footballer
- R. N. Sandberg, American playwright and lecturer at Princeton University
- Roland Sandberg (born 1946), Swedish footballer
- Ryne Sandberg (1959–2025), American baseball player, coach, and manager
- Sandy Sandberg (1910–1989), American football player
- Sheryl Sandberg, Chief Operating Officer of Facebook
- Thomas Sandberg, Danish composer
- Tom Sandberg, Norwegian Nordic combined skier
- Willem Sandberg (1897–1984), Dutch typographer and museum curator
