= Ripstein =

Ripstein is a surname. Notable people with the surname include:

- Alfredo Ripstein (1916–2007), Mexican film producer
- Arturo Ripstein (born 1943), Mexican film director
- Arthur Ripstein (born 1958), Canadian philosopher
- Gabriel Ripstein (born 1972), Mexican film producer, director, editor, and screenwriter
- Jacqueline Ripstein, Mexican artist
