= Jacobine =

Jacobine is a Dutch and Scandinavian feminine given name. The name is a feminine form of Jacob, which is of Hebrew origin. It is also a form of the given name Jacqueline.

People with this name include:

- Jacobine Gjertz (1819–1862), Norwegian pianist, composer and writer
- Jacobine Jones (1897–1976), Canadian sculptor
- Jacobine Susanne Madsen, birth name of Ina Madsen (1867–1935), Norwegian opera singer
- Jacobine Rye (1851–1939), Norwegian defence activist and educator
- Jacobine Veenhoven (born 1984), Dutch rower
- Jacobine Camilla Wergeland, birth name of Camilla Collett (1813–1895), Norwegian writer
