= Jaclyn =

- Pronunciation: Jack-lynn
- Gender: Female

Origin
- Origin: Hebrew through French
- Meaning: "(The name bearer) may/will/shall follow/heed/seize by the heel/watch/guard/protect”, "Supplanter/Assailant", "May God protect"

Other names
- Related names: Jacqueline, Jackie

Jaclyn, often abbreviated to "Jackie", is a feminine given name. It is variant of Jacqueline, a French feminine form of Jacques which in turn comes from Jacob, a Hebrew name meaning "supplanter" or possibly "may God protect". Notable people with this name include:

- Jaclyn Corin (born 2000), American activist and advocate for gun control
- Jaclyn Dahm (born 1977), American model and Playboy Playmate
- Jaclyn DeSantis (born 1979), American actress
- Jaclyn Dowaliby (1981–1988), American murder victim
- Jaclyn Ford, American politician
- Jaclyn Hales (born 1986), American actress
- Jaclyn Hill (born 1990), American YouTuber
- Jaclyn Jose (1963–2024), Filipina actress
- Jaclyn Linetsky (1986–2003), Canadian actress
- Jaclyn Marielle Jaffe, American actress
- Jaclyn Moriarty (born 1968), Australian actress
- Jaclyn Reding, American romance novelist
- Jaclyn Sienna India, American travel adviser
- Jaclyn Smith (born 1945), American television actress
- Jaclyn Stapp (born 1980), American activist, philanthropist and former Miss New York
- Jaclyn Victor (born 1978), Malaysian singer
- Jaclyn Zimmermann, American politician

== See also ==
- Jackie (given name)
- Jacklyn (disambiguation)
- Jacqueline (given name)
- Jacquelyn, ring name of Jacqueline Moore
- List of people starting with "Jaclyn"
