= Jeremy Ostermiller =

American entrepreneur and business executive

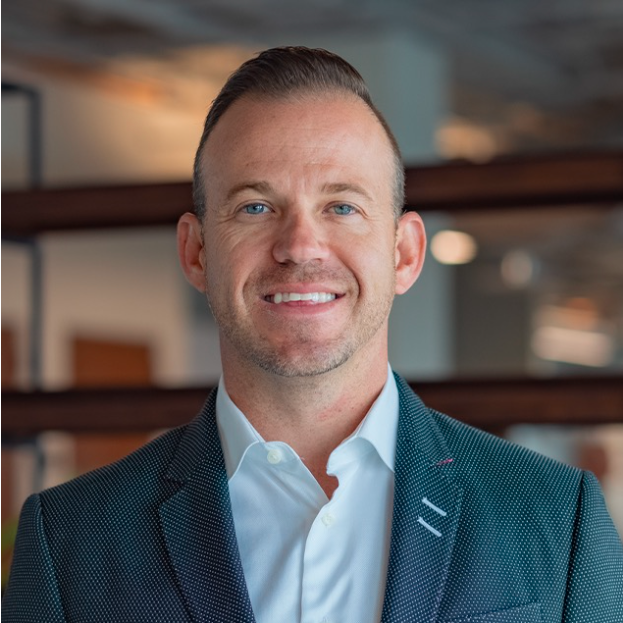
- Born: Aurora, Colorado, U.S.
- Education: Colorado State University (BA)
- Occupations: Entrepreneur, business executive
- Employer: Edison Interactive
- Known for: Founder of Altitude Digital; co-founder of Edison Interactive
- Title: Chief Executive Officer

Jeremy Ostermiller is an American entrepreneur and business executive based in Denver, Colorado. He is the founder of Altitude Digital, a digital advertising technology company established in 2009, and co-founder of Edison Interactive, a software company that develops content management system software for connected devices.

During his career, companies founded or co-founded by Ostermiller have appeared multiple times on the Inc. 5000 list of America's fastest-growing private companies and on the Deloitte Technology Fast 500 ranking. In 2015, he received the Ernst & Young Entrepreneur of the Year Award for the Mountain Desert region for his work in advertising technology.

Ostermiller has also written on digital advertising, publisher monetization and technology for publications including MediaPost, AdExchanger and Forbes.

He has served on the boards and advisory councils of several business, educational and nonprofit organizations in Colorado, including the Institute for Entrepreneurship at Colorado State University, Levitt Pavilion Denver, and other civic organizations.

== Early life and education ==
Ostermiller was born and raised in Aurora, Colorado. According to Colorado State University, he started his first business while still a teenager before pursuing a career in media and advertising.

He attended the University of Northern Colorado before transferring to Colorado State University, where he earned a Bachelor of Arts degree in Technical Journalism with a business emphasis.

Before entering the technology sector, Ostermiller worked in newspaper advertising and media sales, where he received the Denver Newspaper Agency's Sales Person of the Year recognition in 2005.

== Career ==
=== Altitude Digital (2009–2017) ===
In 2009, during the Great Recession, Ostermiller founded Altitude Digital, a Denver-based digital advertising technology company specializing in programmatic advertising, online video advertising and publisher monetization.

The company developed advertising technology for digital publishers, with a focus on programmatic video advertising. During its growth, Altitude Digital expanded its publisher network and was reported by the company to rank among the ten largest online video advertising platforms in the United States based on measurements from comScore and Quantcast.

Between 2013 and 2016, Altitude Digital completed several institutional financing rounds. In January 2013, the company raised a $5 million Series A investment led by Mercato Partners. In August 2014, it secured a $7 million credit facility from Silicon Valley Bank. In April 2015, the company announced $30 million in financing from FastPay to support continued expansion.

In 2016, Altitude Digital launched its ARENA self-service programmatic advertising platform for digital publishers following an additional financing round.

During Ostermiller's tenure as chief executive officer, Altitude Digital appeared on the Inc. 5000 list of America's fastest-growing private companies for four consecutive years. The company also received recognition including Colorado Companies to Watch, Lead411's Hottest Colorado Company award, a Denver Post Top Workplace designation, and a ColoradoBiz Top Company award.

In October 2016, Ostermiller stepped down as chief executive officer while remaining on the company's board of directors.

In August 2017, Altitude Digital was acquired by Genesis Media, a New York-based advertising technology company, which combined the businesses following the acquisition.

=== Edison Interactive (2017–2024) ===
In March 2017, Ostermiller co-founded Edison Interactive, a Denver-based technology company that develops cloud-based content management system software for connected devices. The company's platform has been deployed across hotels, rental vehicle fleets, golf carts, ski resorts and other hospitality and transportation environments.

The company raised venture capital financing during its early growth, including an investment from professional golfer Greg Norman, who also joined its board of directors.

Between 2021 and 2024, Edison Interactive appeared on the Inc. 5000 list for four consecutive years. The company also appeared on the Deloitte Technology Fast 500 in 2022 and 2023.

In 2024, Ostermiller transitioned from chief executive officer to chairman of the board.

=== Consumer ventures ===
Following his work in advertising technology, Ostermiller became involved in consumer products and lifestyle brands.

==== Death Before Decaf ====
In 2025, Ostermiller co-founded Death Before Decaf, a Colorado-based company that produces canned cold brew coffee beverages. The company markets ready-to-drink coffee products that are distributed through direct-to-consumer sales and selected retail outlets, including 7-Eleven locations.

==== Steeltown Garage Co. ====
Ostermiller also operates Steeltown Garage Co., a motorcycle-inspired apparel and lifestyle brand originally established in Hamilton, Ontario, Canada, in 2017. The company sells motorcycle-themed clothing, riding gear and related accessories through direct-to-consumer channels.

== Awards and recognition ==
Ostermiller received the Ernst & Young Entrepreneur of the Year Award for the Mountain Desert region in 2015 for his work with Altitude Digital. He had previously been named a finalist for the award in 2013.

Companies founded or co-founded by Ostermiller have appeared multiple times on the Inc. 5000 list of America's fastest-growing private companies and on the Deloitte Technology Fast 500 ranking.

Additional recognition associated with Ostermiller or his companies includes the Colorado Technology Association APEX Award, Denver Business Journal's 40 Under 40, Colorado Companies to Watch, Lead411's Hottest Colorado Company, and Red Herring Top 100 North America.

== Nonprofit and civic involvement ==
Ostermiller has served on the boards or advisory councils of several educational, business and nonprofit organizations in Colorado.

Since 2022, he has served on the advisory council for the Institute for Entrepreneurship at the Colorado State University College of Business.

He has also served with organizations including Levitt Pavilion Denver, the Metropolitan State University of Denver Foundation, the Young Presidents' Organization (YPO), the Blackstone Entrepreneurs Network Colorado, Youth on Record and the Young Americans Center for Financial Education.

== Philanthropy ==
Ostermiller has participated in charitable initiatives supporting organizations including Children's Hospital Colorado, Habitat for Humanity, the Boys & Girls Clubs of Metro Denver and Youth on Record.

== Mentoring ==
Ostermiller has participated in entrepreneurship mentoring through organizations including the Blackstone Entrepreneurs Network Colorado and the Young Americans Center for Financial Education. He has also served as a judge for the Ernst & Young Entrepreneur of the Year program.

== Writing and media ==
Ostermiller has written on digital advertising, publisher monetization and technology for publications including MediaPost, AdExchanger, Forbes, Videonuze and Adotas.

He has been interviewed or profiled by publications including Business Insider, TechCrunch, The Denver Post, Denver Business Journal, AdExchanger and other media covering digital advertising and technology.
