= Coach Jackie J =

American social media personality (born 2002)

- Johnston in 2026
- Born: Jackie Johnston; February 9, 2002 (age 24)
- Education: Louisiana State University (BFA)
- Occupation: Social media personality

Instagram information
- Page: Coach Jackie J
- Years active: 2023–present
- Followers: 613,000

TikTok information
- Page: Coach Jackie J
- Years active: 2021–present
- Followers: 1.1 million
- Last updated: November 21, 2026

Jackie Johnston (born February 9, 2002), known online as Coach Jackie J, is an American social media personality known for posting about women's sports.

== Early life ==
Johnston grew up in a military family. While living in Germany, she played soccer as the only girl on a boys' team. She attended Louisiana State University, where she majored in film and television and was part of the club rowing team. Her earliest TikTok posts saw her singing and playing ukulele.

== Career ==
Johnston began gaining traction on social media posting about the 2023 FIFA Women's World Cup. She soon discovered a niche posting entertaining content about women's sports in all varieties, covering headline news, highlighting underrepresented stories, and celebrating women athletes from around the world. She grew a following during a boom time for women's sports. She became especially known for her series "Is She Gay or Does She Just Coach Women's Basketball?", which she later expanded to other sports. She has called herself just a fan and not a journalist.

Johnston began hosting a podcast, Is She Game?, in 2026, produced by Higher Ground Productions and Run-A-Muck Media. She had a combined 1.5 million followers between Instagram and TikTok by this time. The same year, she partnered with the National Women's Soccer League (NWSL) by hosting live altcasts on Victory+ with Brittany Isenhour and serving as captain in the NWSL Skills Challenge opposite Paige Bueckers.

== Personal life ==
Johnston is a lesbian. She lives in Washington, D.C.
