= Jaklin =

Jaklin is both a feminine given name and a surname. Notable people with the name include:

== Given name ==
- Jaklin Alawi (born 1990), Bulgarian tennis player
- Jaklin Baghdasaryan (born 1997), Armenian singer and songwriter
- Jaklin Çarkçı (born 1958), Armenian Turkish opera singer
- Jaklin Derderian (1952–2025), Armenian Iranian composer, lyricist, and musician
- Jaklin Kornfilt, American linguist
- Jaklin Zlatanova (born 1988), Bulgarian basketball player

== Surname ==
- Gertrud Jaklin (1916–1998), Austrian jurist
- Ingvald Jaklin (1896–1966), Norwegian politician

== See also ==
- Jaklin Klugman (1977–1996), American Thoroughbred racehorse
