= Pamela Drucker Mann =

American media executive

- Born: Malibu, California, U.S.
- Occupation: Media executive
- Employer(s): Condé Nast (2005–2024); Run-A-Muck Media (2025–present)
- Known for: Global Chief Revenue Officer at Condé Nast; Co-founder and CEO of Run-A-Muck Media
- Awards: Adweek Top 50 Executives; Advertising Age Media Maven (2015); Publishing Executive of the Year (2015); Folio Top Women in Media (2016)

Pamela Drucker Mann is an American media executive and co-founder of Run-A-Muck Media. She is best known for her nearly two-decade career at Condé Nast, where she most recently served as Global Chief Revenue Officer and President of U.S. & International Revenue. Her career has been covered by independent outlets including The New York Times, Business of Fashion, Variety, Deadline, The Drum, and Adweek.

== Early life ==
Drucker Mann began her career in editorial roles, contributing to women's and culture publications such as Sassy and Jump magazine. She later transitioned into advertising and commercial roles at Primedia and the Reader’s Digest Association.

== Condé Nast ==
Drucker Mann joined Condé Nast in 2005 as Director of Sales at Jane magazine. Over time, she rose through the organization, overseeing Glamour and the Food Innovation Group, which combined Bon Appétit and Epicurious. Her tenure coincided with the company's expansion into digital video and branded content.

In 2017, she was named Chief Revenue and Marketing Officer of Condé Nast, becoming the first woman to hold the combined role.

In 2019, she was promoted to Global Chief Revenue Officer and President of U.S. and International Revenue, responsible for unified commercial strategy across domestic and international markets inclusive of all digital, video and social products.

Her departure in 2024 was reported by Business of Fashion and MediaPost, with Condé Nast CEO Roger Lynch crediting her for building a globally integrated commercial organization.

== Run-A-Muck Media ==
In 2025, Drucker Mann co-founded Run-A-Muck Media with television producer Ilene Chaiken and actor Jennifer Beals. She serves as CEO. Variety reported that the company was launched to develop creator-driven, franchise-oriented stories across film, television, and emerging platforms.

The New York Times positioned Run-A-Muck within a wider trend of Hollywood veterans forming independent ventures outside traditional studios.
