= Jackie Peng =

Canadian chess player (born 1998)

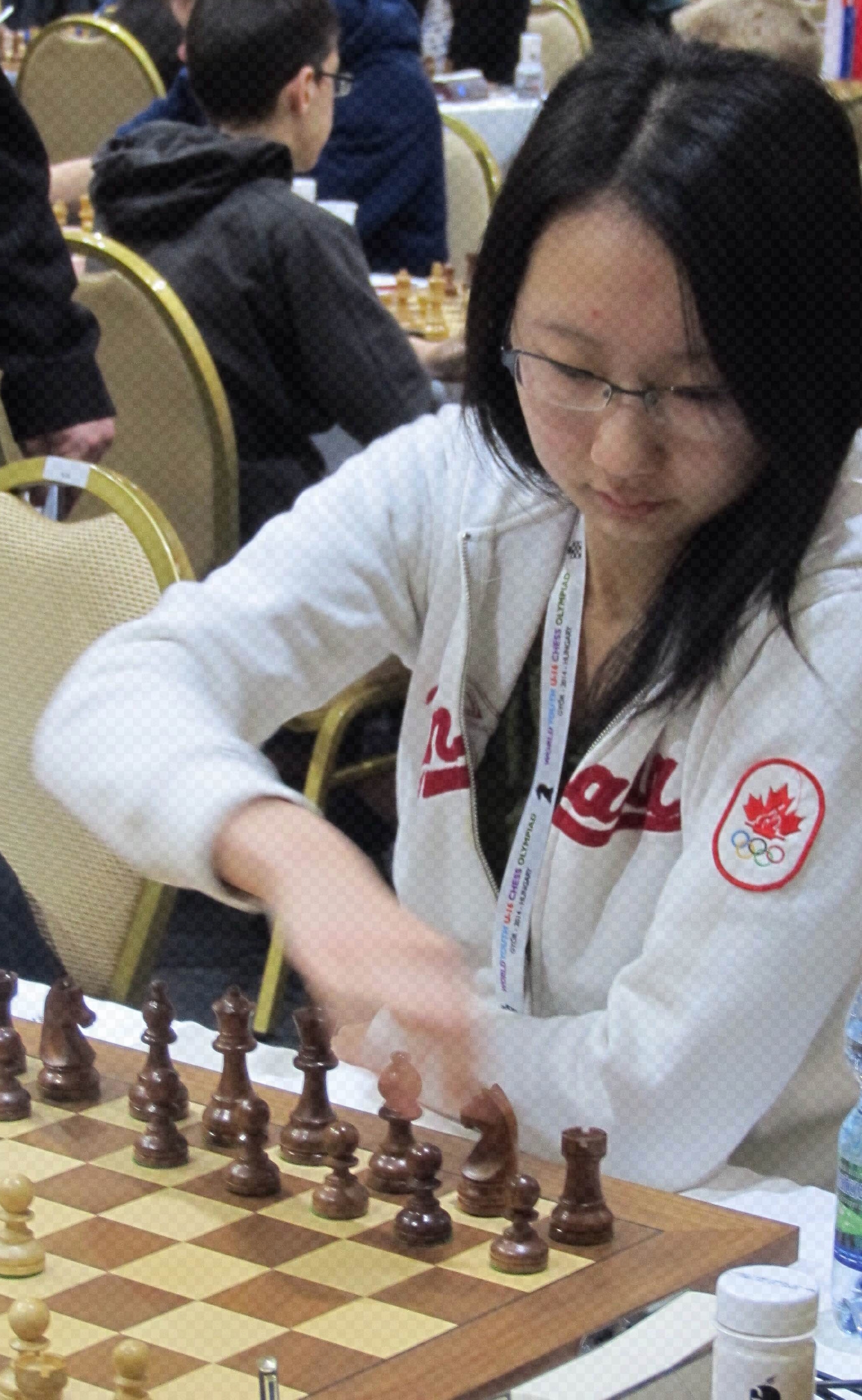
- Peng representing Canada at the 2014 Under-16 Chess Olympiad

Personal information
- Born: 1998 (age 27–28) Richmond Hill, Ontario

Chess career
- Country: Canada
- Title: Woman International Master (2014)
- FIDE rating: 1914 (April 2016)
- Peak rating: 2035 (July 2013)

Jackie Peng (born 1998) is a Canadian chess player. She is a doctoral student at the University of Pennsylvania originally from Toronto, Ontario, Canada. Among her accomplishments in competitive chess, she was 2011 Canadian Amateur Chess Champion; and she represented Canada on the Women's Team at the 40th Chess Olympiad.

== Chess career ==
In 2008, Peng was the Ontario Girls Under-10 Champion; won first place in the Ontario Girls Grade 4 Championship; and was the Canadian Girls Under-10 Champion. She represented Canada at the World Girls Under-10 Championship in Vung Tau, Vietnam, sharing 19th place.

In 2009, Peng was Ontario Girls Grade 5 Champion.

In 2010, Peng was Ontario Grade 6 Champion; and Canadian Girls Under-12 Champion. She received Kalev Pugi Fund award to represent Canada at the Pan-American Girls Under-12 Championship in Bento Gonçalves, Brazil. At age 12, she was the youngest award recipient for years when records are available (2003–12). She finished with a bronze medal in 3rd place, This was the first (and only, through 2014) medal for Canada in the history of the Pan-American Youth Championships. The World Chess Federation (FIDE) awarded her the Woman Candidate Master title. Peng represented Canada at the World Girls Under-12 Championship in Porto Carras, Greece, finishing in 12th place.

In 2011, Peng was Canadian Junior Girl Champion. She represented Canada at the Pan-American Girls Under-14 Championship in Cali, Colombia, finishing tied for 5th place. Back home, Peng won the Canadian Amateur Chess Championship.

In 2012, Peng received a second Kalev Pugi Fund award to represent Canada on the Women's Team at the 40th Chess Olympiad in Istanbul, Turkey. She was the second youngest player ever to represent Canada at the Chess Olympiad. There, she qualified for the Woman FIDE Master title, which she was awarded later in 2012.

In 2013, Peng was awarded the Chess Federation of Canada's National Master title. She was the first female to receive this award and, at age 15, the youngest female to have the title officially awarded. Competing in the Susan Polgar Foundation 10th National Invitational for Girls in St. Louis, USA, she finished in 4th place. Peng won a scholarship to Webster University in St. Louis, USA, for US$13,000/year x 4 years = US$52,000. This was one of the largest prizes ever won by a Canadian chess player.

In 2014, Peng finished in 2nd place in the Kasparov Chess Foundation All-Girls US National Under-16 Championship in Northbrook, Illinois, USA. Peng received her third Kalev Pugi Fund award to represent Canada at the North American Junior (Under-20) Championship. She tied for 1st place among females, thereby qualifying for FIDE's Woman International Master title, which she received later in 2014. Peng represented Canada on its team at the World Youth Under-16 Chess Olympiad in Győr, Hungary.

In 2015, Peng was awarded Life Membership in the Chess Federation of Canada. She tied for 1st place in the 12th Kasparov Chess Foundation All-Girls US National Under-18 Championship in Chicago, USA.
