= Jackie Sagana =

Spanish musician (born 1984)

- Also known as: Jackie Sagana
- Born: Jaqueline Sagana Felix; 8 April 1984 (age 42); Barcelona, Spain
- Origin: Barcelona, Spain
- Genres: Pop, electronic, R&B, dance, independent music
- Occupation: Singer
- Instrument: Vocals
- Years active: 2006–present
- Labels: Sony BMG Music, Blanco & Negro, Roster Music, Vale Music
- Website: https://twitter.com/JackieSagana

Jacqueline Sagana (born 8 April 1984 in Barcelona, Spain) known as Jackie Sagana, is a Spanish R&B singer of Filipino descent.

== Early life ==
Jackie is the eldest sister of Maria Sagana and is married to singer / songwriter Austin who formed a group in 2006 as Jackstin.

== Career ==
In 2006 she met her husband Austin Music and decided to create the "Jackstin" music group, releasing their first album "Taste ya" from which they released the first single with the same name and that was the melody of the show "Fama: A bailar " in Spain.

Three years later, in 2009, Jackstin released his last single as a group "Sexy Boy" for Sony BMG Music to launch as a solo singer to the world of music.

In 2010 he published his first album "Rock it" and in 2011, along with radio host and DJ Dani Moreno recorded the song "Domino" which will be awarded the best national dance / pop project nomination with Enrique Iglesias, Ludacris or Juan Magan.

== Discography ==
=== Albums ===
Album	Title	Year	Type
Taste ya	Taste ya	2006	Jackstin
Temptation	Sexy Boy	2009	Jackstin
Rock it	Rock it	2010	Debut Jackie Sagana

=== Singles ===
Title	Year	Type	Label
Taste Ya	2006	Jackstin	Warner Music (Vale Music)
Sexy Boy	2009	Jackstin	Universal Music Spain
Rock it	2010	Jackie Sagana	Universal Music Spain
Domino (ft Dani Moreno)	2011	Featuring	Roster Music
Sex on the beach	2012	Single	Clipper's Sound SL

== Awards ==
- Awards "40 Principales"(Spain) to the best national dance / pop project for "Domino" with Dani Moreno in 2011.
