= Lawrence Jacquelin =

American racing driver

- Born: July 13, 1923; New Haven, Connecticut, US
- Died: November 25, 1992 (aged 69); New Haven, Connecticut, US

NASCAR Cup Series career
- 1 race run over 1 year
- Best finish: 41st – 1952
Wins	Top tens	Poles
0	0	0

Lawrence Jacquelin (July 13, 1923 – November 25, 1992) was an American NASCAR driver.

== Life and career ==
Jacquelin was born on July 13, 1923, in New Haven, Connecticut. On September 14, 1952, Jacquelin competed in his first and only Cup Series event, at Langhorne Speedway, in Langhorne, Pennsylvania. Starting 39th in the forty-four car field, Jacquelin fell out after 34 laps due to overheating problems, resulting in a 41st-place effort.
