= Jacqueline =

Jacqueline may refer to:

== People ==
- Jacqueline (given name), including a list of people with the name
- Jacqueline Moore (born 1964), ring name "Jacqueline", American professional wrestler

== Arts and entertainment ==
- Jacqueline (1923 film), an American silent film directed by Dell Henderson
- Jacqueline (1956 film), a British film directed by Roy Ward Baker
- Jacqueline (1959 film), a West German film directed by Wolfgang Liebeneiner
- Jacqueline (painting), a 1961 portrait by Pablo Picasso
- "Jacqueline" (The Coral song), 2007
- "Jacqueline", a song from the album Revolver Soul by Alabama 3
- "Jacqueline", a song from the album Franz Ferdinand by Franz Ferdinand
- "Jacqueline", a song from the album Undercurrent by Sarah Jarosz

== Other uses ==
- 1017 Jacqueline, an asteroid
