= Johanna Kundmann =

Austrian judge

Johanna Pauline Alexandrine Kundmann (born 24 April 1914 in Mistelbach; died 8 May 2000 in Linz) was an Austrian lawyer and judge. In 1947, Kundmann, together with Gertrud Jaklin, was one of the first two women who were appointed judges in Austria. Johanna Kundmann subsequently worked as a judge on various courts in the district of the Oberlandesgericht Linz and was also appointed to the Appellate Court.
