= Jackie O (disambiguation) =

Jackie O (Jacqueline Kennedy Onassis, 1929–1994) was the wife of the 35th President of the United States, John F. Kennedy.

Jackie O may also refer to:

- Jackie O (opera), a 1997 opera by Michael Daugherty and Wayne Koestenbaum
- Jackie O (radio host) (Jacqueline Ellen Marie Henderson, born 1975), an Australian television presenter and radio personality

== See also ==
- Jacki-O (born 1975), American rapper
- Jackie-O Motherfucker, an American experimental rock group
