= Ann-Sofie Sandberg =

Swedish food scientist

Ann-Sofie Sandberg (born in 1951) is a Swedish food scientist. She is a professor in Food and Nutritional Science at Chalmers University of Technology. Sandberg research involves the bioavailability of nutrients and bioactive components in food, and understanding how to improve nutritional value in food. She was awarded the Gustaf Dalén Medal for outstanding scientific contributions in the field of food.

== Biography ==
Sandberg received her PhD in 1982 at the University of Gothenburg. Her dissertation was on the 'Effects of Dietary Fibers on Ileostomy Patients'. Sandberg is the head of the food sciences department at Chalmers University of Technology, and is chair of the faculty, serving on the Chalmers board.

In 2010, she was elected into the Royal Swedish Academy of Engineering Sciences. She was awarded an honorary doctorate degree in 2013 at the Sahlgrenska Academy for strengthening the connections between medical and technological research in Gothenburg.

In 2014 Sandberg was awarded the Gustaf Dalén Medal for "outstanding scientific contributions in the field of food, which have successfully contributed to strengthening Chalmers' brand as a university and as an internationally prominent research environment". She has been awarded an honorary doctorate from the Sahlgrenska Academy.

== Work ==
Sandberg research involves the bioavailability of nutrients and bioactive components in food, and understanding how to improve nutritional value in food. Her research involves developing analysis techniques, and she has investigated the health effects of fish in the diet.

Sandberg has co-authored more than 300 publications within her research area.

== Awards ==
- 2014 : Chalmers Gustaf Dalén Memorial Medal for "prominent academic contributions in food science".
