= Jacqueline Verdeau-Paillès =

French neuropsychiatrist, music therapist (1924–2010)

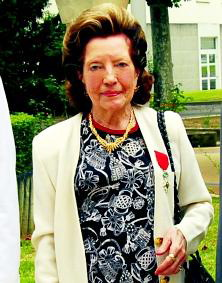
- Born: Jacqueline Verdeau; 13 October 1924; Bordeaux
- Died: 20 May 2010 (aged 85); Limoux
- Occupations: Neuropsychiatrist, music therapist
- Known for: Music therapy
- Spouse: Édouard Paillés
- Children: 2

Jacqueline Verdeau-Paillès (13 October 1924 – 20 May 2010) was a French neuropsychiatrist, music therapist and part-time lecturer at the Paris Descartes University and the University of Luxembourg. She contributed to the evolution of psychiatry using music therapy in France and around the world beginning in the 1970s. Her method of receptive music therapy was based on listening to musical excerpts or sounds.

== Biography ==
Born in Bordeaux, she studied neuropsychiatry and earned her Doctor of Medicine in 1951. She began working in Limoux in 1953 as one of the department heads at what was then the psychiatric hospital of the Sisters of Cluny. There, she founded and developed the Tilleuls clinic in the 1960s. A lover of art and music, she created a unique treatment method that is now widely recognized. In 1973, she introduced music therapy at the Limoux day hospital. This technique uses music as a tool to restore, maintain or improve a person's mental, physical and emotional health.

She lectured extensively to international audiences, and her knowledge of the arts enriched her clinical practice. She had a passion for discovering and sharing the beauty in music, painting, theater and literature. She spoke several languages and traveled the world, giving lectures, participating in seminars, exploring new regions and, above all, experiencing other cultures.

Up to the day before her fatal stroke, she attended a conference of her peers. She was highly regarded by her colleagues and patients, as well as by the many artists who contributed to her work. Among the most prominent were Yehudi Menuhin, James Conlon, and Gabriel Bacquier, who wrote prefaces to three of her books.

Her obituary says: "Her last book, entitled 'Madness at the Opera,' co-authored with Michel Laxenaire, a psychiatrist and psychoanalyst, was highly acclaimed. The book demonstrates that the history of madness - both in its medical knowledge and in its social and philosophical representations - intersects with that of opera."

Jacqueline Verdeau-Paillès died 20 May 2010 in Limoux at 86, just after the publication of her last book.

== Personal life ==
She married Édouard Paillés, who died in 1990, and they had two children.

== Honors and distinctions ==
- In 2006: she was made a Knight of the Legion of Honour
- Vice-president of the French Association of Music Therapy

== Selected works ==
- Verdeau-Pailles, Jacqueline. "Les techniques psychomusicales actives." Psychotherapy and Psychosomatics 29, no. 1/4 (1978): 320-324.
- Verdeau-Paillès, Jacqueline, Jean-Marie Guiraud-Caladou, and Paul Sivadon. "Les techniques psychomusicales actives de groupe et leur application en psychiatrie." (1986).
- Verdeau-Pailles, Jacqueline. "Aspects of psychotherapies. Music therapy and its specificity." L'encephale 17, no. 1 (1991): 43-49.
- Verdeau-Pailles, Jacqueline. "ISME Commission Reports." International Journal of Music Education 1 (1993): 50-63.
