= Jacobine Rye =

Norwegian defence activist and educator (1851–1939)

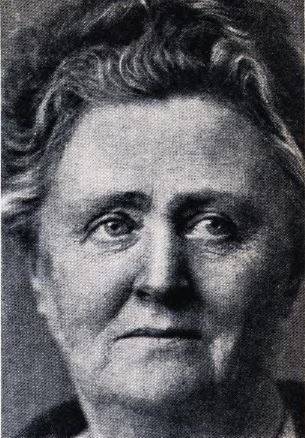
- Jacobine Rye in 1928
- Born: Jacobine Ulrica Rye; 20 April 1851; Christiania, Norway
- Died: 4 February 1939 (aged 87); Oslo, Norway

Jacobine Ulrica Rye (20 April 1851, Christiania — 4 February 1939, Oslo) was a Norwegian defence activist who is remembered above all for the advances she made in teaching deaf children. In 1915, she inaugurated special teaching courses for children with hearing problems at the Ila School in Oslo. After specialized studies in Copenhagen, in 1917 she founded Tunghørtes Vel, an association for those who were hard of hearing, and went on to support the founding of Statens skole for talelidende (State School for the Speech Impaired). After retiring in 1926, she spent her remaining years calling for efforts to reinforce arrangements for Norway's defence. In 1928 she established the association Norske Kvinners Frivillige Verneplikt (Norwegian Women's Voluntary Consciption), which she chaired until 1935.

== Early life ==
Born on 20 April 1861 in Christiania, Jacobine Ulrica Rye was the daughter of Johan Henrik Rye (1787–1868), an army officer, and his wife Hanna Hermana Balthazara née Krag. She was raised on her father's Tandberg estate in the rural Ringerike district.

== Career ==
After completing teacher training, in 1883 Rye appointed as a teacher at Hedevig Rosing's school for the deaf in Christiania, where she spent the next ten years. Thereafter she transferred to the primary school in Christiania where she taught a special class for backward children. On discovering that many of them were disadvantaged as a result of hearing difficulties, she was able to create a more advanced class for them. In 1915, this led to her running special teaching courses for children with hearing problems at Oslo's Ila School. After undertaking specialized studies in Copenhagen, she established Tunghørtes Vel, an association devoted to the interests of those who were hard of hearing. In addition, she trained teachers who intended to serve in schools for children with hearing difficulties. Rye was active in raising funding in connection with the establishment in 1919 of Statens skole for talelidende (State School for the Speech Impaired), later known as the Granhaug School.

After retiring in 1926, she spent her remaining years calling for efforts to reinforce arrangements for Norway's defence. In 1928 she established the association Norske Kvinners Frivillige Verneplikt (Norwegian Women's Voluntary Consciption), which she chaired until 1935.

Jacobine Rye died in Oslo on 4 February 1939.

== Awards ==
For her early contributions in support of defence, in 1914 she was honoured with the King's Medal of Merit (gold). On her retirement from the association for Women's Voluntary Subscription, she became a Knight 1st class of the Order of St. Olav in 1935.
