= Jacquetta =

Jacquetta is a feminine given name which may refer to:

- Jacquetta of Luxembourg (1415/16–1472), Duchess of Bedford, Countess Rivers
- Jacquetta Woodville, Baroness Strange of Knockin, daughter of Jacquetta of Luxembourg
- Jacquetta Hawkes (1910–1996), English archaeologist and writer
- Jacquetta May, British writer, actress and theatre director
- Jacquetta Wheeler (born 1981), English model
