= Gertrud Jaklin =

Austrian judge (b. 1916, d. 1998)

Gertrud Hildegard Jaklin (April 6, 1916 in Vienna - December 9, 1998) was an Austrian lawyer and judge. Jaklin together with Johanna Kundmann in 1947 was one of the first two women who were appointed judge in Austria. After the end of National Socialism in Austria, Jaklin was appointed in February 1947 assistant judge in the Higher Regional Court of Vienna in the first class of judges. Subsequently, Gertrud Jaklin worked as a judge at the Regional Court for Civil Law Matters, at the Juvenile Court and at the District Court of Innere Stadt.
