= Louise Sandberg =

Louise Sandberg is a Danish born fashion designer and polo player based in London, UK.

In 2003 Louise started to collaborate with the St. Barth's based French designer Donale. Together they were among the first to bring out the concept of specific holiday and cruise wear fashion collections. This was the first time the kaftan was to be seen as a beachwear fashion item. The idea took off and within months the designs had a cult following being seen on celebrities including Madonna, Heidi Klum and Jodie Kidd. By 2004 Louise Sandberg was selling from her specialist boutique in London had also started selling online. She extended her list of designers to include the very best and most exclusive from the island of St. Barth's, including Vanita Rosa, Pop and Les Papoux. She also extended her range to include beach accessories like belts, jewellery, bags and beach hats.

In 2012, The Duchess of Cambridge announced that she was a big fan of Louise Sandberg’s kaftans.

Louise is an international polo player having played the game since 2001. She has played polo in many countries; Switzerland, Ghana, Argentina, Thailand, Spain and Iran as well as the UK where she is based. In 2006, Louise was part of the winning England Ladies team in Iran. Significantly, they were the first women to play openly in Iran for almost 800 years.

== Family ==
Louise Sandberg is the great-great-granddaughter of the Norwegian impressionist landscape painter Frits Thaulow (1847–1906) best known for his landscape and water paintings. She is the great-granddaughter of the Danish film director Anders W. Sandberg (1887–1938). Among the 42 films he directed are the groundbreaking silent movies The Golden Clown (1926) and The Last Night (1928) starring Diomira Jacobini. Louise is also the granddaughter of the film producer Henrik Sandberg (1915–1993), who produced dozens of post-war Danish comedy movies that are still watched today, notably the ‘Soldaterkammerater’ series.
