= Jacqui Malouf =

Canadian chef (born 1968)

Jacqui Malouf (born December 12, 1968, in Etobicoke, Ontario) is a Canadian television host, cook, and author.

Raised in Canada, she attended the University of Western Ontario, where she was a member of Kappa Alpha Theta, before beginning her career as a stand-up comic. Her first hosting job was on SportsFigures. Malouf then joined the Food Network as Bobby Flay's co-host on Hot Off the Grill with Bobby Flay. She remained in that role until her contract with the Food Network expired.

In December 2003 she released Booty Food: A Date by Date, Nibble by Nibble, Course by Course Guide to Cultivating Love and Passion through Food, published by Bloomsbury.

Malouf has gone on host Bravo's Things I Hate About You and WE's Full Frontal Fashion. She is a contributor to Best Week Ever on VH1 and continues to perform stand-up comedy in New York City.

She has two daughters, Kenna and Georgia, and is married to actor James McCauley.
