= Jacqueline Panis =

French politician (born 1948)

Jacqueline Panis (born 16 April 1948) was a member of the Senate of France, representing the Meurthe-et-Moselle department from 2007 to 2011. She is a member of the Union for a Popular Movement.
