= Sandberg (Celtic settlement) =

Celtic settlement in Austria

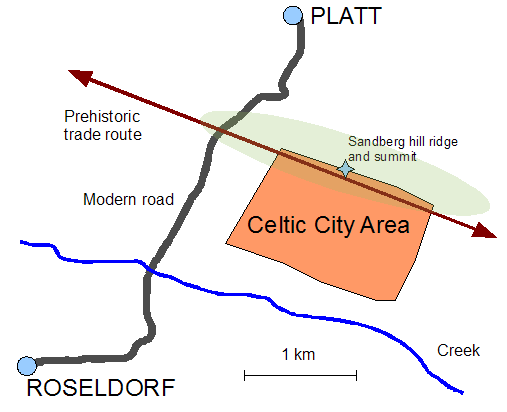
Schematic plan of the Sandberg archaeological site

The Sandberg, a hill ridge in the northwestern part of the Weinviertel region of Lower Austria approximately 70 km north of Vienna, is one of the potentially most important archaeological sites of the middle La Tène culture in Central Europe. The settlement which flourished there was not fortified, and therefore does not qualify as an oppidum. However, what is known to date suggests that it was not only large (probably covering more than 400,000 square metres) but also a wealthy and powerful center for trade, culture, religion and political power between southern Bohemia and the Danube valley. Its inhabitants are likely to have been Boii, or belonged to a Celtic tribe that was under their direct influence.

== Location ==
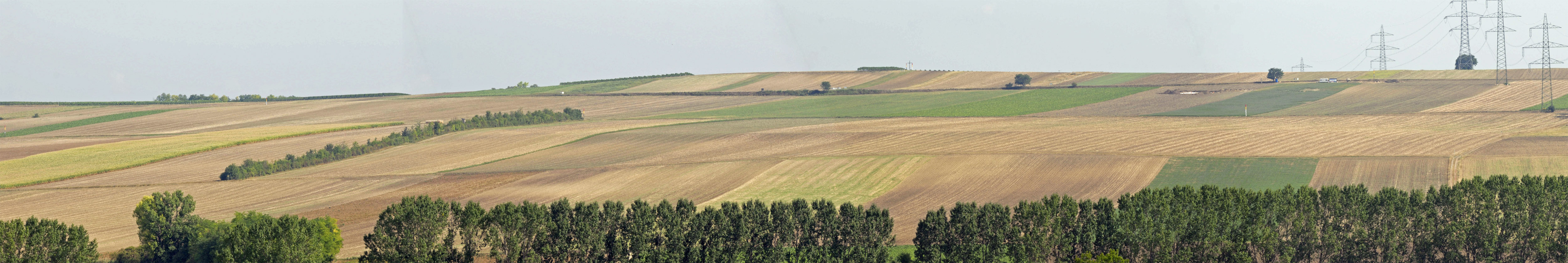
The site of the Celtic settlement on the southern slope of the Sandberg ridge, believed to have been densely populated in the 3rd century BC

The Sandberg ridge (situated at 48°39′0″N 15°58′0″E) separates the villages of Platt and Roseldorf in the district of Hollabrunn. It consists almost entirely of fertile Löß soil and has been subject to intense agricultural use for centuries. Its summit, although not high, offers a panoramic view far into the surrounding countryside, suggesting strategic considerations might have played a significant role in the selection of the location. While the inhabited area (as far as it has been delineated by surveys) was situated on the southern slope of the hill on the territory of Roseldorf, Platt has much better logistic connections and traditionally harbors the archaeologists' base camp.

== Identification and primary characterization ==
Although surface finds of Celtic coins (about 1,200 have found their way into the numismatics collection of the National Museum of Arts in Vienna) and other artifacts had been reported since the late 19th century, the true importance of the site began to be appreciated only by the 1990s. It was not before 1991 that the area was placed under legal protection as a cultural heritage site.

From 1995 to 2000, geomagnetic surveys were carried out which covered 220,000 square metres and identified 450 distinct subterranean structures consistent with the remains of wooden houses, an enclosure in the south, and a cluster of three larger quadratic structures. Results from pilot prospections beyond this characterized area, as well as the history of surface finds and accounts from the local population, suggests that the settlement could have been at least twice as large.

== Excavations ==
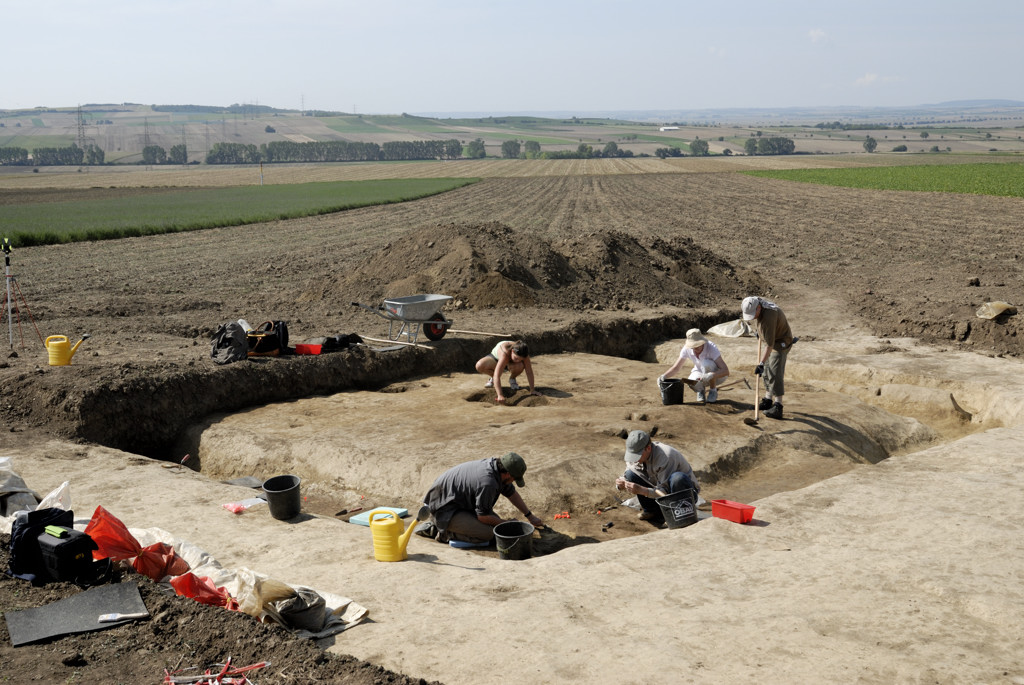
Excavation of the ditches surrounding one of the smaller sanctuaries (2007)

Systematic excavations commenced in 2001, and initially probed only a very small (18 x 25 m) segment of what had been interpreted as a residential zone. The sunken foundations of three wooden buildings were confirmed. One was found to have been a barn, the remnants of which contained an appreciable amount of burnt grain which was identified as Einkorn wheat (Triticum boeoticum), Emmer (Triticon dicoccon) and Proso millet (Panicum miliaceum). A nearby pit contained an oven, and might have served as a bakery. Grape seeds tentatively suggest that the Sandberg people might have already grown and prepared wine. Pottery, bracelet glassware and fibulae were found in significant numbers, along with coins, a set of three dice carved from bone, and several pieces of Realgar, an arsenic sulfide mineral with uses in medicine and as an orange pigment. Most significantly, minting equipment offered proof for the suspected role of the settlement as a center for trade and commerce.

From 2005 to 2007, the three quadratic structures (one measuring 25 x 25 m, the other two slightly smaller) were completely excavated, and confirmed to have been Celtic sanctuaries of a Western European type not yet found in Central Europe, with their design closely resembling the cult site at Gournay-sur-Aronde in northern France. They probably date back to the early La Tène period. In two of these structures the surrounding ditches contained large amounts of bones from animal and human sacrifices, ritually damaged weapons, coins, and several fibulae A large, irregular-shaped pit adjacent to one of the two smaller sanctuaries, impressively rich in finds, was opened for excavation in August 2007.

== Significance ==
The excavations at the Sandberg site have probed only a few of the locations which the geomagnetic surveys had identified as containing interesting structures, and the archaeobotanical and other scientific follow-up work has only begun. What is known already indicates that the Sandberg city might have resembled La Tène culture settlements of a type and size known from France and Southern Germany, but so far not believed to have existed in Austria. The Museum for Prehistory in Asparn an der Zaya has constructed a life-size model of the large sanctuary.
