= MediaPost =

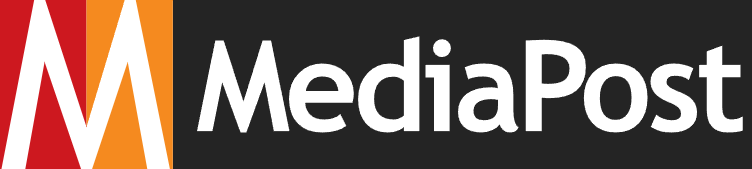
- Headquarters location: New York City
- Publication types: trade magazines; online newsletters
- Nonfiction topics: advertising; marketing; media
- Official website: mediapost.com

MediaPost is an American publisher of trade magazines covering the topics of advertising, marketing, and media. Headquartered in New York City, its print publications include the magazines OMMA (short for Online Media Marketing and Advertising) and Media. As of 2013, the company also publishes over 50 weekly email newsletters covering the media, online media, and marketing. Its online publications include Marketing Daily, MediaDailyNews, and Online Media Daily. Publications devoted to coverage of social media include Social Media & Marketing Daily, Video Daily, and Mobile Marketing Daily. The print magazines and websites are supported by advertising, and the company also hosts conferences for digital media and marketing practitioners. Through its subscription website Mediapost.com, the company offers a directory of media industry contacts, as well as research, ratings, and data on advertising rates.
