= Jacqueline Royaards-Sandberg =

Dutch actress (1876–1976)

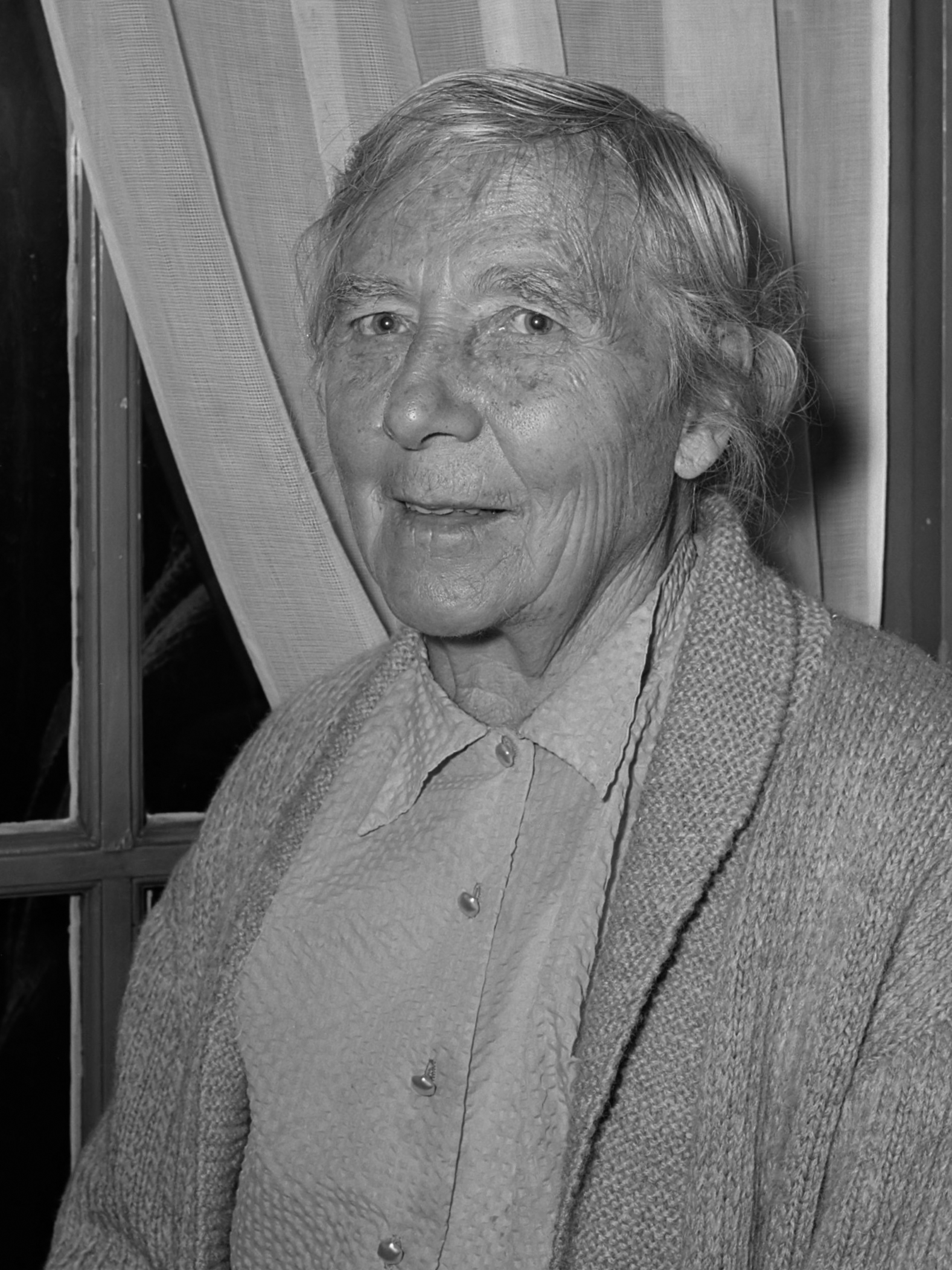
- Royaards-Sandberg in 1956
- Born: 27 October 1876; Pamekasan, Dutch East Indies
- Died: 30 March 1976 (aged 99); Amsterdam, Netherlands
- Occupation: Actress
- Years active: 1901–1972
- Spouse: Willem Royaards (m. 1901–1929)
- Children: 4

Jacqueline Royaards-Sandberg (27 October 1876 – 30 March 1976) was a Dutch stage actress of the 19th and 20th centuries. She began acting on stage in 1897 and did it professionally from 1901. Royaards-Sandberg worked for the Royal Dutch Theater Association, the Het Masker, the Amsterdam Theater Company, the Dutch Comedy, Theater, Ensemble and the Amsterdam Toneel companies.

== Early life ==
On 27 October 1876, Royaards-Sandberg was born to the soldier Johan Jacob Sandberg and Marianne Begemann in Pamekasan in the former Dutch East Indies. She had four siblings and the family moved to a large terraced house in Haarlem in the Netherlands in 1882. Following private education at a boarding school in Germany, Royaards-Sandberg was enrolled by her parents at the boarding school in Driebergen in January 1892. She left the boarding school and went back to the family home in March 1893 and enrolled in private lessons in French, Italian and violin. Royaards-Sandberg went on to attend both the Frankfurter Theaterschule, and the Amsterdam School of Vocal and Dramatic Art to read from the age of 20 and was tutored by Cateau Esser and André Jolles. She took the advice of Jolles and took acting lessons at the Comédie-Française in Paris.

== Career ==
She made her debut on stage in Little Eyolf by Henrik Ibsen which was directed by Esser on 5 November 1897. Royaards-Sandberg went on to make her first professional stage appearance playing the part of Emilia in William Shakespeare's The Winter's Tale at the Royal Dutch Theater Association on 15 November 1901 and also was cast as Sanderijn in Lanseloet van Denemerken De Duecht' in Elckerlijc in 1908.

Between 1908 and 1924, Royaards-Sandberg featured in plays that were directed by her husband Willem Royaards. She was cast in the role of Eve in the play Adam in Exile from Eden by Joost van den Vondel on multiple occasions. Royaards-Sandberg also had roles as Rafaël in Vondel's Lucifer in 1910 as well as Badeloch in Gijsbreght van Aemstel between 1911 and 1912 by the same playwright. She was cast in the role of Olivia in Shakespeare's Twelfth Night between 1916 and 1917 and Greetje in Johann Wolfgang von Goethe's Goethe's Faust from 1917 to 1918.

Following the death of her husband in 1929, Royaards-Sandberg and others established the Nieuwe Schouwtooneel company. She went on to work with the Het Masker, the Amsterdam Theater Company, the Dutch Comedy, Theater, Ensemble and the Amsterdam Toneel. She declined to register for the Nederlandsche Kultuurkamer during the Second World War but she would return to stage acting following the war. In 1955, Royaards-Sandberg setup the theater group Test with Kees van Iersel and Amy van Marken and it performed experimental theatre following regular performances. When she was 80 years old, she was cast as Esther Crampton in Home, sweet home by Paul Osborn for the 1956–1957 theatre season. A decade later, Royaards-Sandberg played the role of the grandmother in Federico García Lorca's The House of Bernarda Alba. Following her receiving the silver medal from the city of Amsterdam in 1967, she sustained a fall at her home two years later, which restricted her movement but she had a role in The Loves of Cass McGuire by Brian Friel in 1972. Royaards-Sandberg published her memoirs, Herinneringen in 1972.

== Personal life ==
She was married to the actor and stage director Willem Royaards from 23 December 1903 to his death in 1929. They had four children. On the evening of 30 March 1976, Royaards-Sandberg died at her home on the Prinsengracht in Amsterdam. Her funeral took place two days later on the afternoon of 2 April and she was inteerned at Westerveld Cemetery and Crematorium in Velsen.

== Legacy ==
Johan de Meester in Het Parool wrote of Royaards-Sandberg that he felt "the great merit of Jacqueline Royaards is that she played a major role in a period when there was a clear change in taste in the stage" and that the actress had "matured as an actress at a higher age, much more humane" to become in his view "a much more pleasant actress". Anton Koolhaas in Vrij Nederland wrote noted the actress attracted praise when she aged as "Not only because her playing became more simple, but especially because her whole style of playing became internalized to such an extent that her 'presence' already had an aura that needed very little addition of 'play' and typing."
