= Jacqui =

Jacqui is a given name, usually a diminutive form of Jacqueline or Jacquelyn. Notable people with the name include:

- Jacqui Abbott (born 1973), female lead singer with the band The Beautiful South
- Jacqui Ainsley (born 1981), English model from Southend in Essex
- Jacqui Briggs, fictional character from the Mortal Kombat series
- Jacqui Cooper (born 1973), Australian freestyle skier
- Jacqui Cowderoy, former Australian alpine skier
- Jacqui Dankworth, British singer
- Jacqui Dean (born 1957), New Zealand politician
- Jacqui Delaney, Australian netball player and coach
- Jacqui Dunn (born 1984), Australian artistic gymnast
- Jacqui Frisby, camogie player and accounts assistant
- Jacqui Gordon (born 1962), Australian actress
- Jacqui Gordon-Lawrence, British former actress
- Jacqui Hand (born 1999), New Zealand footballer
- Jacqui Hurley (born 1984), Irish athlete, sports manager, sports broadcaster and chat show host
- Jacqui Jackson, the single parent of seven children, three adolescent girls and four boys
- Jacqui Katona, western-educated Aboriginal woman, led the campaign to stop the Jabiluka uranium mine in the Northern Territory
- Jacqui Lait (born 1947), British politician and Conservative Party Member of Parliament for Beckenham
- Jacqui Lambie, Australian Politician
- Jacqui Malouf (born 1968), television host, cook, and author
- Jacqui Maxwell (born 1981), Australian actress
- Jacqui McQueen, fictional character from the Channel 4 soap opera Hollyoaks
- Jacqui McShee (born 1943), English singer
- Jacqui Mengler, Australian sprint canoeist who competed in the late 1990s
- Jacqui Oatley, British sports broadcaster for BBC Sport
- Jacqui Rose, British crime fiction novelist
- Jacqui Safra, descendant of the Syrian-Swiss Jewish Safra banking family
- Jacqui Smith (born 1962), British Labour politician, the first ever female Home Secretary
- Jacqui Wood (born 1950), British archaeologist and writer
- song written by Richie Powell
