= Jacqueline Ripstein =

Mexican artist

Jacqueline Ripstein is an artist from Mexico City. She created the "Invisible Art and Light Technique" for which she holds two patents.
