= Zandberg (surname) =

Zandberg is a surname. Notable people with the surname include:

- Adrian Zandberg (born 1979), Polish politician
- Gerhard Zandberg (born 1983), South African swimmer
- Michael Zandberg (born 1980), Israeli footballer
- Tamar Zandberg (born 1976), Israeli politician
- Eduard Zandberg (born 1996), South African Professional rugby player
