= Hayes (surname) =

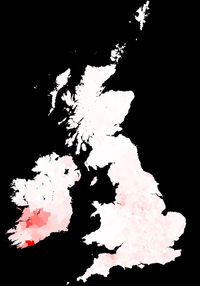
- Hayes surname map
- Language: English

Origin
- Region of origin: Ireland, England, Scotland, Wales, France, Germany

Other names
- Variant forms: Hawes, Hay, Haye, Hays, Heas, Heyes, Highes, O'Hea, Hease, Heise, Hughes, Haynes, Haines

Hayes is an English language surname. In the United States Census, 1990, Hayes was the 100th most common surname recorded. The oldest record of the surname dates to 1197 in the Eynsham Cartulary of Oxfordshire, where it appears in the form Heise. There are nineteen coats of arms assumed by or granted to individuals with this or a similar surname. Though primarily a surname, "Hayes" sometimes appears as a given name in census records.

== Origin ==
=== Derived from name of Irish god ===
In Ireland, Hayes originated as a Gaelic polygenetic surname "O hAodha", meaning descendant of Aodh ("fire"), or of Aed, an Irish mythological god. Septs in most counties anglicised "O hAodha" to "Hayes". In County Cork, it became "O'Hea". In the province of Ulster, it became "Hughes", the patronymic of Hugh, an anglicized form of the given name Aodh. Hayes is noted on a public record in County Wexford as early as 1182. In County Cork, under the Munster providence, Hayes falls under the banner of the McNamara clan in the Dalcassian Sept. Other Irish Hayeses have also been associated with Clan Cian, the ruling O'Carroll clan of southern Ireland.

=== Derived from place-name element ===
==== England ====
In England, Hayes arose as a locational surname, associated with one of the several places named or suffixed -Hay, -Hays, -Hayes, etc., such as those in Kent, or Middlesex. Such place names had two origins, one based on the Old English haes (brushwood, underwood) and the other based on horg (enclosure) or hege (hedge). The distribution of Hayes in Great Britain in 1881 and 1998 is similar, and restricted to areas of England well separated from Scotland and showing some penetration into Wales. This surname has gained in popularity in the century between 1881 and 1998, but remains at a rank below 150 and a frequency lower than that in the United States and some other countries of the Commonwealth.

==== Scotland ====
In Scotland, Hayes is a Scoto-Norman surname, a direct translation of the Normans' locational surname "de la Haye", meaning "of La Haye", La Haye ("the hedge") being the name of several towns on the Cotentin Peninsula of Normandy, France. The first Norman namebearer to arrive in Scotland was William II de la Haye in the time of the Norman invasion. Clan Hay descends from him.

=== Other ===
Hayes also can derive from the Yiddish name Khaye, meaning "life".

== Notable people with the surname ==
Listed here are people who share the "Hayes" surname, organized by birth year, to assist in assembling a view of the geographic distribution of this surname over time.

Born after 1600
Wiebbe Hayes	c. 1608	unknown	Dutch • Colonial soldier of the Dutch East India Company and a decorated national hero.
Nathaniel Haies	1634	1706	Founding settler of Norwalk, Connecticut.
Catherine Hayes	1690	1726	English murderess.
Born after 1700
Philip Hayes (composer)	1738	1797	British • composer, organist, singer and conductor
John Hayes (explorer)	1768	1831	British • Explorer for the British East India Company
Born after 1800
Augustus Allen Hayes	1806	1882	American • Chemist and mineralogist
Catherine Hayes	1818	1861	Irish • First internationally acclaimed Irish-born opera diva; highest paid singer of her time
Rutherford B. Hayes	1822	1893	American • Nineteenth president of the United States
Bully Hayes	c.1829	1877	American • South Sea pirate
Lucy Webb Hayes	1831	1889	American • First Lady to President Rutherford B. Hayes
Isaac Israel Hayes	1832	1881	American • Arctic explorer and physician
Augustus Allen Hayes	1837	1892	American • Author and journalist
Thomas Hayes (San Francisco landowner)	before 1849	1868	Irish-American • Land owner in San Francisco area; made key contributions to the development of the San Francisco rail system
Alice Hayes	1862/3	1913	British horse trainer
Patrick Joseph Hayes	1867	1938	American • Cardinal of the Roman Catholic Church; eighth Bishop (fifth Archbishop) of the Roman Catholic Archdiocese of New York; first papal military vicar for the United States
John Hayes (Tasmanian politician)	1868	1956	Australian • Thirty-first premier of Tasmania; eighth president of the Australian Senate
Frank Hayes (actor)	1871	1923	American • Silent film actor
Ernie Hayes	1876	1953	English • Professional cricketer; Member of the Order of the British Empire (MBE)
Vince Hayes	1879	after 1910	English • Professional football (soccer) player
Stephen Hayes (hurler)	before 1880	(unknown)	Irish • Professional hurler
Frank Hayes (unionist)	1882	1948	American • President of the United Mine Workers of America; lieutenant governor of Colorado
Richard Hayes (Irish politician)	1882	1958	Irish • National politician
J. Milton Hayes	1884	1940	English • Actor and poet; known for his dramatic monologues
Ralph Leo Hayes	1884	1970	American • Catholic bishop of Helena, Montana and Davenport, Iowa: Rector of the Pontifical North American College in Rome, Italy
George "Gabby" Hayes	1885	1969	American • Television and film actor; recipient of a star on the Hollywood Walk of Fame; inductee into the Western Performers Hall of Fame
Johnny Hayes	1886	1965	American • Olympic Gold medalist in the marathon race • Second generation Irish-American
Michael Hayes (politician)	1889	1976	Irish • National politician
Seán Hayes (Tipperary politician)	1890	1968	
Juan Enrique Hayes	1891	1976	Argentine • Football player
Flora Kaai Hayes	1893	1968	Hawaiian • Territorial politician
Ennis Hayes	1896	1956	Argentine • Football player
Eric Hayes	1896	1951	British • soldier
Born after 1900
Helen Hayes	1900	1993	American • Actress; winner of Oscar, Tony, Emmy and Grammy awards
John Daniel Hayes	1902	1991	American • Rear admiral in the United States Navy; naval historian and teacher of naval history
Richard J. Hayes	1902	1976	Irish • WWII code breaker, & Director of National Library of Ireland
Saul Hayes	1906	1980	Canadian • Executive director and executive vice-president of the Canadian Jewish Congress
Clancy Hayes	1908	1972	American • Jazz singer, banjoist, guitarist
Patricia Hayes	1909	1996	English • Television and film actress; Officer of the Order of the British Empire (OBE)
Bernadene Hayes	1912	1987	American • actress and singer
Wayne Woodrow "Woody" Hayes	1913	1987	American • College football coach; inducted into the College Football Hall of Fame
James L. Hayes	1915	1989	American • Educator and president of the American Management Association
Bill Hayes (footballer, born 1915)	1915	1987	Irish • Professional football (soccer) player
Margaret Hayes	1916	1977	American • Actress
John Hayes (harness racer)	1917	1998	Canadian • Professional horse racer; inducted into the Canadian Horse Racing Hall of Fame
Seán Hayes (Cork politician)	before 1918	1941	Irish • National politician
Colin Hayes (artist)	1919	2003	British • Artist
John Michael Hayes	1919	2008	American • Screenwriter and Alfred Hitchcock collaborator; Edgar Award winner
Wallace D. Hayes	c.1919	2001	Chinese-American • Provided fundamental contributions to the understanding of supersonic and hypersonic flight
Stephen Hayes	1902	1974	Irish • Chief of Staff of the Irish Republican Army
Nevin William Hayes	1922	1988	American • Prelate of the Territorial Prelature of Sicuani (Peru), Auxiliary Bishop of the Catholic Archdiocese of Chicago
Ira Hayes	1923	1955	Pima • Paramarine in the United States Marine Corps; one of five soldiers who appear in the iconic photograph of the raising of the American flag on the island of Iwo Jima during World War II
Colin Hayes	1924	1999	Australian • Champion thoroughbred racehorse trainer; Order of Australia (AM); Officer of the Order of the British Empire (OBE)
John B. Hayes	1924	2001	American • Sixteenth Commandant of the United States Coast Guard
Bill Hayes (actor)	1925	2024	American • Television and stage actor, singer; played the character Doug Williams on the soap opera Days of our Lives
Janet Gray Hayes	1926	2014	American • Sixtieth Mayor of San Jose, California
John Hayes (cricketer)	1927	2007	New Zealander • Professional cricketer
Lord Alfred Hayes	1928	2005	British • Professional wrestler, manager, and commentator best known for his work in the U.S. with the promotion now known as WWE
Willie Hayes	1928	2014	Irish • Professional football (soccer) player
John Hayes (art historian)	1929	2005	British • Authority on the paintings of Thomas Gainsborough; director of the London Museum and National Portrait Gallery
John Hayes (director)	1930	2000	American • B-movie genre film director
David Hayes (sculptor)	1931	2013	American • Award-winning sculptor
Brian Hayes (broadcaster)	1937	2025	Australian • Radio personality
Mickie Most	1938	2003	English • Record producer • born "Michael Peter Hayes"
Vic Hayes	1941	(living)	Dutch • "Father of Wi-Fi".
Bob Hayes	1942	2002	American • Olympic Gold Medalist sprinter; professional football player; at one time considered the world's fastest man
Geoffrey Hayes	1942	2018	English • Television presenter and actor; presented Rainbow (TV series)
Isaac Hayes	1942	2008	American • Soul and funk musician; winner of Oscar and Grammy awards
Paul Martin Hayes	1942	1995	English • Historian and writer on fascism
Pat Hayes	1944	(living)	British • Computer scientist known for his seminal and continuing contributions to the field of Artificial Intelligence
Denis Hayes	1944	(living)	American • Environmental Advocate, Proponent of Solar Power, and Founder of Earth Day
Brian Hayes QC (lawyer)	1944	(living)	Australian • Environmental Lawyer
Elvin Hayes	1945	(living)	American • Professional basketball player, inducted into the Basketball Hall of Fame
Frank Hayes (cricketer)	1946	(living)	English • Professional cricketer
Billy Hayes (writer)	1947	(living)	American • Film writer, actor, director; author of Midnight Express
John Hayes (New Zealand politician)	1948	(living)	New Zealander • Member of Parliament
Sharon Hayes (politician)	1948	(living)	Canadian • Member of Parliament
Mark Hayes (golfer)	1949	2018	American • Professional golfer
Stephen K. Hayes	1949	(living)	American • Martial arts instructor and author; inductee into the Black Belt Hall of Fame (Instructor of the Year); former security advisor and bodyguard to the Dalai Lama of Tibet
Born after 1950
Dennis Hayes	1950	(living)	American • Co-developer of the first commercial modem for the IBM PC; founder of Hayes Microcomputer Products
Jerry Hayes	1953	(living)	British • National politician; barrister
Mark Hayes (composer)	1953	(living)	American • Gospel music composer
Beth Hayes	1955	1984	American • Economist specializing in theoretical microeconomics
Chris Hayes (politician)	1955	(living)	Australian • National politician for the Division of Werriwa
Austin Hayes	1958	1986	Irish • Professional football (soccer) player
John Hayes (British politician)	1958	(living)	English • National politician
Michael Hayes (wrestler)	1959	(living)	American • Professional wrestler and writer for professional wrestling events
Calvin Hayes	1960	(living)	English • Musician; founding member of Johnny Hates Jazz
David A. Hayes	1962	(living)	Australian • Thoroughbred racehorse trainer
Kevin Hayes	1962	(living)	English • Professional cricketer
Bruce Hayes (swimmer)	1963	(living)	American • Olympic Gold Medalist swimmer
David Hayes	1963	(living)	American • Conductor/Director The Philadelphia Singers
Stevie Plunder	1963	1996	Australian • Singer/songwriter; founding member of The Whitlams
Bernie Hayes	before 1963	(living)	Australian • Singer/songwriter
Christian Hayes	1964	(living)	English • Rock singer, songwriter, guitarist
Michael Hayes (spree killer)	1964	(living)	American • Murderer notable for successful use of insanity as a defense
J. P. Hayes	1965	(living)	American • Professional golfer
Cylvia Hayes	1967	(living)	American • Former First Lady of Oregon
Eric Hayes (American football)	1967	(living)	American • football player
Andrea Hayes	1969	(living)	American • Backstroke swimmer
Brian Hayes (politician)	1969	(living)	Irish • National politician
Sean Hayes (musician)	1969	(living)	American • Folk music singer-songwriter
Trisa Hayes	1969	(living)	American • Professional wrestler
Sean Hayes (actor)	1970	(living)	American • Film and television actor; Emmy award winner
Chris Hayes (American football)	1972	(living)	American • Professional football player
Darren Hayes	1972	(living)	Australian • Pop and electronica singer, songwriter
Amy Faye Hayes	1973	(living)	American • ring announcer and model
David Hayes (musician)	before 1973	(living)	American • Bass guitar player
Edwina Hayes	1973	(living)	Irish-English • Singer, songwriter
John Hayes (rugby union)	1973	(living)	Irish • Professional rugby union player
Josh Hayes	1975	(living)	American • Professional motorcycle racer
Peter Hayes	1976	(living)	American • Founder/Guitarist in Black Rebel Motorcycle Club
David Hayes (soccer)	1976	(living)	American • Professional football (soccer) player
Emma Hayes	1976	(living)	English • football (soccer) manager
Kirsty Hayes	1977	(living)	British • Diplomat and civil servant
Gemma Hayes	1977	(living)	Irish • Musician, singer-songwriter
Christopher Hayes (journalist)	1979	(living)	American • Journalist; editor of The Nation
Trent Hayes	before 1980	(living)	Australian • Non-fiction author and business consultant
Frank Hayes (musician)	before 1980	(living)	American • Filk musician; computer technology columnist
Lenny Hayes	1980	(living)	Australian Rules Football player
Brett Hayes	1984	(living)	American baseball player
Hazel Hayes	1985	(living)	Irish YouTuber, filmmaker, and author
David Hayes (writer)	before 1986	(living)	Canadian • Non-fiction author and essayist
Jordan Hayes	1987	(living)	Canadian • Actress
Jimmy Hayes (ice hockey)	1989	2021	American • Ice hockey player
Hunter Hayes	1991	(living)	American • Country music singer, songwriter, multi-instrumentalist
Kevin Hayes (ice hockey)	1992	(living)	American • Ice hockey player
Dion Hayes	1994	(living)	American • Rapper; known professionally as 42 Dugg
Nigel Hayes	1994	(living)	American • Basketball player
Tae Hayes	1997	(living)	American • Football player
Kaleb Hayes	1999	(living)	American • Football player
Born after 2000
Jaxson Hayes	2000	(living)	American • Basketball player
Ryan Hayes (American football)	2000	(living)	American • Football player
Dayon Hayes	2001	(living)	American • Football player
Leah Hayes	2005	(living)	American • Swimmer

=== Additional notable people ===
- Billie Hayes (1924–2021), American actress
- Brian Hayes (scientist) (born 1942), American scientist and writer
- Dorothy Hayes (disambiguation)
- Genna Chanelle Hayes, Australian filmmaker, see AACTA Award for Best Indie Film#2022
- Geno Hayes (1987–2021), American football player
- Gregory J. Hayes (born 1960/61), American businessman, chairman and CEO of United Technologies
- Helen Hayes (politician) (born 1974), British Labour Party politician, Member of Parliament for Dulwich and West Norwood since 2015
- Jimmy Hayes (born 1946), American politician, former member of the United States House of Representatives
- John Russell Hayes (1866–1945), American poet and librarian
- Kate Simpson Hayes (1856–1945), Canadian writer, teacher, legislative librarian
- Leila Hayes (1940–2025), Australian actress
- Phebe Hayes, American independent historian, focused on the African American history of Iberia Parish, Louisiana
- Richard Hayes (professor) (born 1945), American-Canadian academic in the areas of Buddhism and Indian philosophy
- Robert Hayes, American murderer also known as "The Daytona Beach killer"
- Wade Hayes (born 1969), American country singer

== Fictional characters with the surname ==
- Ainsley Hayes in the American television series The West Wing
- Adam Hayes from the fiction podcast The Bright Sessions
- Angela Hayes in the Academy Award-winning film American Beauty
- Angela Hayes in the Academy Award-winning film Three Billboards Outside Ebbing Missouri
- Ben Hayes in the 2005 American film remake of King Kong
- Beth Hayes in the horror video game Slender: The Arrival
- Blake Hayes in the American television soap opera The Bold and the Beautiful
- Captain Hayes, a recurring villain of TV series Totally Spies!
- Damian Hayes, character in Degrassi: The Next Generation
- Emily Hayes in the graphic novel series Amulet
- Harriet Hayes (or Hannah Harriet Hayes) in the American television series Studio 60
- Henry Hayes in Stargate SG-1
- Major J. Hayes in the third season of Star Trek: Enterprise
- Master Chief Special Warfare Operator Jason Hayes in the American television series SEAL Team.
- Karen Hayes in the American television series 24
- Lavon Hayes, in the American television series Hart of Dixie
- Lisa Hayes, a character in the American television sitcom Diff'rent Strokes
- Lisa Hayes in the anime Robotech
- Logan Hayes in the American television soap opera General Hospital
- Maddie Hayes in the American television series Moonlighting
- Michael Hayes in American TV series of the same name
- Molly Hayes, a main character from the Marvel Comics series Runaways
- Sally Hayes, character from The Catcher in the Rye
- Farmer Michael Hayes in the Christy Moore song "The Pursuit of Farmer Michael Hayes"
- Taylor Hayes in the American television soap opera The Bold and the Beautiful
- William Hayes, the main character in the 1978 film Midnight Express
- William Matthew Hayes, the main character in the film Definitely, Maybe
- Willie Mays Hayes in the films Major League and Major League II

== Distribution ==
As a surname, Hayes is the 191st most common surname in Great Britain, with 42,475 bearers. It is most common in Kent, where it is the 73rd most common surname, with 4,828 bearers. Other concentrations include, Buckinghamshire, (34th,3,304), Caerphilly, (43rd,1,700), Carmarthenshire, (48th,1,696), Merseyside, (79th,3,252), Swansea, (86th,1,704), City of Leeds (165th,1,722), Lancashire, (177th,3,370), Greater London, (288th,3,358), Greater Manchester, (335th,1,724), Cheshire, (386th,1,678), Essex, (618th,1,666), and Scotland. Other notable concentrations include, Tyne and Wear, West Yorkshire including, the City of Wakefield, Nottinghamshire, the Glasgow City council area, Midlothian, Moray, Aberdeenshire, Banffshire, North Yorkshire, South Yorkshire including, the City of Sheffield, Darton, Kirkleatham, and the Highlands.

== See also ==
- , includes people not listed above
- Billy Hayes (disambiguation) • Brian Hayes (disambiguation)
- Chris Hayes (disambiguation)
- David Hayes (disambiguation)
- Frank Hayes (disambiguation)
- Jeremy Hayes (disambiguation) • John Hayes (disambiguation)
- Larry Hayes (disambiguation)
- Mark Hayes (disambiguation) • Michael Hayes (disambiguation)
- Richard Hayes (disambiguation)
- Sean Hayes (disambiguation) • Stephen Hayes (disambiguation)
- Thomas Hayes (disambiguation)
- William Hayes (disambiguation)
- Hays (surname)

== General and cited references ==
- Eynsham abbey (1907). Herbert Edward Salter (ed.). Eynsham Cartulary. Oxford historical society at the Clarendon Press. p. 78. ISBN 1-4325-3622-2.
- Hayes, John (8 February 2008). "Hayes Name Information (Ó'hAodha)". failteromhat.com.
- "Hayes surname group". Surnames & Heraldry. IrishGen.com. Archived from the original on 17 November 2007.
- "Hayes surname meaning". SurnameDB. Name Origin Research.
- kthomas (16 October 2002). "Irish Names H, J". Eolas na hEireann, Information about Ireland. eircom.net.
- Longley, Paul; Alex Singleton; Richard Webber; Daryl Lloyd. "Hayes". The National Trust. Note: Attempts to link directly to search results pages result in failure to find the site.
- United States Census Bureau (9 May 1995). s:1990 Census Name Files dist.all.last (1-100). Retrieved on 4 April 2008.
