= Heyes =

Heyes is a surname. It is variant form of the surname Hayes.

Notable people with the surname include:

- Cecilia Heyes (born 1960), British psychologist and academic
- Cressida Heyes (born 1970), Canadian philosopher
- Darren Heyes (born 1978), English footballer
- David Heyes (born 1946), English politician
- David Heyes (cricketer) (born 1967), English cricketer
- Douglas Heyes (1919–1993), American screenwriter and film producer
- George Heyes (born 1937), English soccer player
- Harry Heyes (1895–?), English footballer
- Herbert Heyes (1889–1958), American actor
- Jack Heyes (born 1902), English soccer player
- Joe Heyes (born 1999), English rugby player
- Joseph Heyes (c. 1863–?), British soccer player
- Mark Heyes (born 1977), Scottish television presenter
- Tasman Heyes (1896–1980), Australian civil servant
- Thomas Heyes (fl. 1598–1603), English publisher
- Tom Heyes, English experimental musician known as Blackhaine

== See also ==
- Catherine Liston-Heyes, Canadian economist
- Victoria Heyes, fictional character in the Terrifier franchise
