= Haye =

Haye is a surname. Notable people with the surname include:

- Abdul Haye (1889–1946), Punjabi lawyer
- David Haye (born 1980), British boxer
- Helen Haye (1874–1957), British actress
- Jack Haye, American banker and academic administrator
- Jovan Haye (born 1982), American football coach
- Julie Haye, fictional character
- Kléber Haye (1937–2023), French engineer and politician
- Ludovic Haye (born 1975), French politician
- Thom Haye (born 1995), Indonesian footballer
- William Haye (1948–2019), Jamaican cricketer

== See also ==
- Hayes (surname)
- La Haye (disambiguation)
