= David Hayes =

David or Dave Hayes may refer to:

- David Hayes (sculptor) (1931–2013), American sculptor
- David J. Hayes (born 1953), U.S. Deputy Secretary of the Interior
- David A. Hayes (born 1962), Australian Thoroughbred racehorse trainer
- David Hayes (author) (born 1953), Canadian writer
- David Hayes (conductor) (born 1963), music director of the Philadelphia Singers
- David S. Hayes (born 1941), Pennsylvania politician
- David Hayes (soccer) (born 1976), player for FC Tampa Bay
- David Hayes (musician), bass guitar player
- David Hayes (hurler), Irish hurler
- David Hayes, owner of Very Small Records
- Dave Hayes (American football) (1896–1956), American football player
- Dave Hayes (politician) (born 1966), American politician in the Washington House of Representatives
- David Hayes (Australian footballer) (born 1949), Australian footballer for Melbourne FC

== See also ==
- David Hays (disambiguation)
- David Hay (disambiguation)
- David Haye (born 1980), British boxer
- David Heyes (born 1946), British MP
