= Alice Hayes =

Alice Hayes may refer to:

- Alice Hayes (Quaker) (1657–1720), English preacher and autobiographer
- Alice M. Hayes (1862/63–1913), British horse trainer
- Alice Hayes, a supervillain in the Pride team of Marvel Comics
