= Alan Wilfred Pearson =

British academic (1934–2019)

Alan Wilfred Pearson (1934–2019) was a British academic and a pioneer in the field of R&D management. He was born in Liverpool in 1934 and died in Alderley Edge, Cheshire in 2019.

Pearson left school in 1951 and began work as a research assistant at Pilkington Glass in St. Helens. In 1960 he moved to Henry Simon in Cheadle Heath to work in the company's flour milling research labs.

In 1965, Pearson joined the Faculty of Economics at the University of Manchester as a lecturer in Economic Statistics. The Manchester Business School was founded in 1965, and in 1966 Pearson transferred to the new institution as a lecturer in Operational Research. He spent the rest of his career there until retirement in 2001.

In 1967, with the support of the Ministry of Technology, Pearson founded and became the Director of the R&D Research Unit at the Manchester Business School. The R&D Research Unit was the precursor to the Manchester Institute of Innovation Research (MIOIR) which today is Europe's largest, and one of the world's leading, research centres in its field. In 1970, he founded the R&D Management Journal, in conjunction with Blackwell Publishers (now Wiley-Blackwell). It was the first publication in Europe dedicated to the discipline of research and development. He was instrumental in forming, and subsequently became chairman of RADMA (Research and Development Management Association) as a means of encouraging low-cost subscriptions to the R&D Management Journal and to provide funding awards for Masters and PhD students in the field.

At the Manchester Business School, Pearson was Director of the MBA Programme (1985–88) and Dean of Faculty (1992–94). The Manchester Business School appointed him Professor of R&D Management in 1994.

In 1999, Pearson became the founding co-Managing Editor of the International Journal of Management Reviews (IJMR), also published by Blackwell, the first review journal in the field of business and management. During his career he authored or co-authored more than 90 articles published in academic journals and was recognised as a leading contributor to the discipline of R&D management.

Throughout his career, Pearson worked with other academic institutions around the world such as the Centre for Creative Leadership (Greensboro, North Carolina, USA), the University of Kiel (Kiel, Germany), and the University of Twente (Twente, Netherlands). In 1991 the Alexander von Humboldt Foundation awarded Pearson the Max Planck Research Award for his work with German academic Klaus Brockhoff. The award was initiated in 1960 to promote international collaboration between German and foreign scientists.
