= Bapsy Jain =

Indian writer

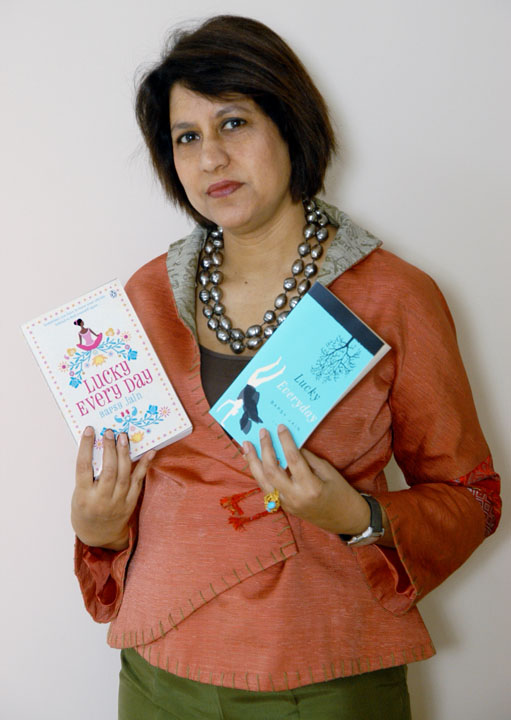

Bapsy Jain is an Indian entrepreneur and author of the novel Lucky Everyday, which portrays the spiritual journey of a woman faced with surprising life challenges.

== Biography ==
Bapsy Jain was born in Calcutta, India. She completed her schooling from Presentation Convent, Kodaikanal and graduated from the Sydenham College of Commerce and Economics, Mumbai. She then left for the UK to further pursue her education in finance and became a member of The Institute of Chartered Accountants in England & Wales.

She married Nitish Jain on 23 November 1985 and they have two sons. Together Bapsy and Nitish Jain have set up business schools under the name of S P Jain School of Global Management in Dubai, Mumbai, Singapore and Sydney. A period of forced bed rest allowed her to start writing and led to her first book Lucky Everyday.

== Writing career ==
Jain worked for ten years on her debut novel, The Blind Pilgrim, published by Penguin. In 2015 she published a sequel titled A Star Called Lucky. Publishers Weekly called the first novel "overstuffed" and the ending "disappointing" but was somewhat kinder to the "amiable sequel".

=== Lucky Everyday ===
Lucky Everyday concerns itself with the human spirit's ability to adjust to the challenges of life. Named a bestseller by Mike Bryan, CEO and President, Penguin Books, it follows the character Lucky Boyce as she transitions from being a professional working in New York to becoming the wife of a wealthy Indian businessman and then on to leading the life of a divorced teacher of yoga.
