= Alan Pilkington =

British engineer (born 1966)

- Born: 1966 (age 59–60); United Kingdom
- Education: Aston University
- Occupations: Work in technology management, enterprise engineering, and operations management

Alan Pilkington (born 1966) is a British engineer and researcher known for his work in technology management, operations management, Manufacturing strategy and enterprise engineering. He has been a professor at the Copenhagen Business School, Hult International Business School and S P Jain School of Global Management. He is currently Professor of Technology Management at Westminster Business School in London. He is past chair of the IEEE Technology Management Council for the UK and Republic of Ireland joint chapter on engineering management.

== Biography ==
Pilkington attended King Edward VI School, Retford and received his B.Eng. degree from De Montfort University in 1987, and his PhD from Aston University in 1992.

After graduation in 1987 Pilkington started his career in industry as project manager in manufacturing engineering at the Rover Group, where from 1989 to 1993 he was part of the Manufacturing Policy Unit. In 1996 he returned to academia as associate professor in operations and technology management at the Royal Holloway, University of London, where he stayed until September 2013. Pilkington has been visiting scholar at the University of California, Davis between 1997 and 2003; at the University of Western Australia between 2003 and 2005; and at Cesar Ritz Colleges in 2011–12. He has held posts at the Hult International Business School in London and Dubai and was a professor at Copenhagen Business School. In 2017 he became adjunct professor at the S P Jain School of Global Management.

Since 2015 he has been professor of technology management at Westminster Business School in London.

At the IEEE Pilkington has chaired the IEEE Technology Management Council for the UK and Republic of Ireland joint Chapter on Engineering Management.

== Work ==
Pilkington has made significant contributions to the field of bibliometrics and operations management. His research interests also cover the fields of innovation, particularly new product development outsourcing for the alternative fuel vehicle, enterprise engineering, and the early startup company.

=== Bibliometrics ===
Using studies based on citation and co-citation tools, Pilkington has made contributions to understanding the development and diffusion of disciplines, particularly in the fields of operations management and innovation.

=== Innovation ===
Pilkington's approach to innovation concerned "product of individual, organisational and knowledge trajectories". His idea was that "modelling the relationships between observed typologies within each of these spheres, conditions for successful innovation can be identified and failures explained. This work is leading to tools which will help managers define successful and achievable technology strategies."

=== Enterprise engineering ===
Pilkington has initiated and directed the Pilkington research in Enterprise Engineering at Royal Holloway. According to Pilkington (2008/13):

Enterprise Engineering is the application of engineering principles to the management of enterprises. It encompasses the application of knowledge, principles, and disciplines related to the analysis, design, implementation and operation of all elements associated with an enterprise.
In essence it is an interdisciplinary field which combines systems engineering and strategic management as it seeks to engineer the entire enterprise in terms of the products, processes and business operations. The view is one of continuous improvement and continued adaptation as firms, processes and markets develop along their life cycles. This total systems approach encompasses the traditional areas of research and development, product design, operations and manufacturing as well as information systems and strategic management.

This Enterprise Engineering research had focussed on five types of management specialties:

- Engineering Management : the application of engineering principles to business practice. It brings together the technological problem-solving savvy of engineering and the organizational, administrative, and planning abilities of management to oversee complex enterprises from conception to completion.
- Innovation Management : discipline of managing processes in innovation. It can be used to develop both product and organizational innovation. Innovation management includes a set of tools that allow managers and engineers to co-operate with a common understanding of goals and processes.
- Operations Management : area of management concerned with overseeing, designing, and controlling the process of production and redesigning business operations in the production of goods or services.
- Service Management : integrated part of supply chain management, the intersection between the actual sales and the customer. The aim of high performance service management is to optimise the service-intensive supply chains, which are usually more complex than the typical finished-goods supply chain.
- Technology Management : set of management disciplines that allows organisations to manage their technological fundamentals to create competitive advantage. Typical concepts used in technology management are technology strategy (a logic or role of technology in organisation), technology forecasting (identification of possible relevant technologies for the organisation)

At Royal Holloway more specific topics of research in this field concerned Alternative fuel Technology, Bibliometrics and Patent analysis.

== Publications ==
Pilkington has authored and co-authored numerous publications in the field of Management of technology, Operations management, Manufacturing strategy and Enterprise engineering. A selection:

- Pilkington, Alan. "Manufacturing strategy regained: evidence for the demise of best-practice." California Management Review 41 (1998): 31–42.
- Pilkington, Alan, and Catherine Liston-Heyes. "Is production and operations management a discipline? A citation/co-citation study." International Journal of Operations & Production Management 19.1 (1999): 7–20.
- Pilkington, Alan, Romano Dyerson, and Omid Tissier. "The electric vehicle:: Patent data as indicators of technological development." World Patent Information 24.1 (2002): 5–12.
- Pilkington, Alan, and Thorsten Teichert. "Management of technology: themes, concepts and relationships." Technovation 26.3 (2006): 288–299.
- Pilkington, Alan, and Jack R. Meredith. "The evolution of the intellectual structure of operations management—1980–2006: A citation/co-citation analysis." Journal of Operations Management 27.3 (2009): 185–202.
- Pilkington, Alan, Edward WN Bernroider, and José-Rodrigo Córdoba. "Information systems as a discipline in the making: comparing EJIS and MISQ between 1995 and 2008." European Journal of Information Systems 21. (2012): 479-495.
- Pilkington, Alan, Roost, Katja, and Thorsten Teichert. "Social network analytics for advanced bibliometrics: referring to actor roles of management journals instead of journal rankings" Scientometrics 112.3 (2017): 1631-1657.
- Kapetaniou, Chrystalla, Alison Rieple, Alan Pilkington, Thomas Frandsen, and Paola Pisano. "Building the layers of a new manufacturing taxonomy: How 3D printing is creating a new landscape of production eco-systems and competitive dynamics." Technological Forecasting and Social Change 128 (2018): 22-35.
- Pilkington, Alan, and Jack R. Meredith. "The diffusion network of research knowledge in operations management." International Journal of Production and Operations Management 38.2 (2018): 333-349.
- Pilkington, Alan, and Jack R. Meredith. "Assessing the exchange of knowledge between operations management and other fields: Some challenges and opportunities." Journal of Operations Management 60 (2018): 47-53.
