= Dorothy Hayes =

Dorothy Hayes may refer to:

- Dorothy Hayes (One Life to Live), fictional character from the television show One Life to Live
- Dorothy E. Hayes (1935–2015), American graphic designer
- Dorothy Hayes Sater (1931–2012), also known as Dottie Hayes, American television reporter

== See also ==
- Dorothy (given name)
- Hayes (surname)
- Dorothy K. Haynes (1918–1987), Scottish horror and supernatural writer
