= Hays (surname) =

Hays is an English and Irish surname, a variant to the name Hayes. Notable people with the surname include:

- Alexander Hays (1819–1864), general in the Federal army during the American Civil War
- Anna Mae Hays (1920–2018), first woman in the U.S. Army to be promoted to general
- Arthur Garfield Hays (1881–1954), attorney for the American Civil Liberties Union
- Austin Hays (born 1995), American baseball player
- Brooks Hays (1898–1981), United States Congressman from Arkansas
- Butch Hays (born 1962), American-Australian basketball player
- Charles Melville Hays (1856–1912), American railroad executive who perished on the Titanic
- Dan Hays (born 1939), Canadian politician
- Daniel P. Hays (1854–1923), American lawyer
- David Hays (cricketer) (born 1944), English-born Scottish cricketer
- David G. Hays (1928–1995), linguist, computer scientist and social scientist
- Ethel Hays (1892–1989), American syndicated cartoonist
- Frank Kerr Hays (1896–1988), American World War I flying ace
- Frank L. Hays (1922–2003), 35th Lieutenant Governor of Colorado, United States
- George Price Hays (1892–1978), Lt. General, Commander of the 10th Mountain Division in the European Theater of Operations in World War II.
- George Washington Hays (1863–1927), governor of the state of Arkansas
- Harry Hays (1909–1982), Canadian senator
- Harry T. Hays (1820–1876), general in the Confederate States Army during the American Civil War
- Helen Hays (1931–2025), American ornithologist and conservationist
- Irene Hays (born 1954), British civil servant and businesswoman
- Isaac Hays (1796–1879), American ophthalmologist and naturalist
- John Coffee Hays (1817–1883), Texas Ranger and sheriff in the Old West
- Judith Salzedo Hays, married name of Judith Salzedo Peixotto (1823–1881), American teacher and principal
- Kathleen Hays, American economics reporter
- Kathryn Hays (1934–2022), American actress
- Kevin Hays (born 1968), American jazz pianist
- Larry Hays, American college baseball coach
- Lee Hays (1914–1981), American folk singer and songwriter
- Maud Callaway Hays (b. 1906), American clubwoman and genealogist
- Moses Judah Hays (1799–1861), Canadian businessman and municipal leader
- Paul Hays, Reading Clerk for the U.S. House of Representatives
- Richard B. Hays (1948–2025), American New Testament scholar, college professor at Duke University
- Robert Hays (born 1947), American actor
- Robert Hays (Tennessee) (c. 1758–1819), brother-in-law of U.S. president Andrew Jackson
- Samuel Hays (disambiguation), several people
- Spencer Hays (1936–2017), American businessman and art collector
- Stockley D. Hays (1788–1831), American soldier, lawyer, nephew of Andrew Jackson
- Todd Hays (born 1969), American Olympic bobsledder
- Tim Hays (1917–2011), American newspaper editor and publisher
- Wayne Hays (1911–1989), United States Congressman from Ohio
- William B. Hays (1844–1912), Mayor of Pittsburgh, Pennsylvania
- Will H. Hays (1879–1954), American politician and Postmaster General
- William Shakespeare Hays (1837–1907), American poet and lyricist

== See also ==
- Hayes (surname)
