= Shannon Lush =

Australian author

- Born: Sydney, Australia
- Occupations: writer and television and radio personality
- Writing career
- Pen name: Australian Cleaning Guru
- Website: members.shannonlush.com

Shannon Lush is an Australian author who is best known for providing tips and hints on tasks such as cleaning and household chores. In addition to writing a number of books, she has made regular guest appearances on TV and Australian Breakfast Radio as a cleaning expert.

== Biography ==
Born in Sydney, Lush is an art restorer and home economist. Her break into the public scene began when she started giving stain removal advice on ABC Radio in 2004. She later compiled a number of these solutions in the form of her first book, Spotless (co-written with Jennifer Fleming), which was released in 2005 and became the Australian number one best-selling book of 2006. She has since released five other books in Australia, all of which have reached best-seller status. Her most recent book, Stainless (co-written with Trent Hayes), was released in 2010 and serves as a how-to book in understanding Lush's stain removal techniques. She has also released three overseas titles, including non-English translations of Spotless.

Lush confirmed her ecological leanings with the release of Save: Your Money, Your Time, Your Planet which was released with an accompanying item called the "Save Wheel" which displayed the carbon footprint of household activities and appliances in terms of the number of trees required to be planted to offset a year's worth of the activity/running time.

Lush writes regular articles for the UK newspaper The Times.

== Bibliography ==
Books

- Spotless (2005), Publisher: ABC Books, ISBN 978-0-7333-1712-5 / ISBN 0-7333-1712-X
- Speedcleaning (2006), Publisher: ABC Books, ISBN 978-0-7333-1932-7 / ISBN 0-7333-1932-7
- How to be Comfy (2007), Publisher: ABC Books, ISBN 978-0-7333-1933-4 / ISBN 0-7333-1933-5
- Save: Your Money, Your Time, Your Planet (2008), Publisher: ABC Books, ISBN 978-0-7333-2444-4 / ISBN 0-7333-2444-4
- Spotless 2 (2009), Publisher: ABC Books, ISBN 978-0-7333-2532-8 / ISBN 0-7333-2532-7
- Stainless (2010), Publisher: ABC Books, ISBN 978-0-7333-2791-9 / ISBN 0-7333-2791-5

Accessories associated with her books

- Comfy Shopping List (2007), Publisher: 'The Five Mile Press', ISBN 978-1-74211-165-0 / ISBN 1-74211-165-3
- ABC Home Palette Carbon Footprint Wheel (2008), Publisher: 'The Five Mile Press', ISBN 978-1-74211-470-5 / ISBN 1-74211-470-9
