= Mark Hayes =

Mark Hayes may refer to:

- Mark Hayes (golfer) (1949–2018), American golfer
- Mark Hayes (composer) (born 1953), American composer and arranger
- Mark Gerard Hayes (born 1956), British/Irish economist and banker
