= David Hay (disambiguation) =

David Hay (born 1948) is a Scottish football player and manager.

David Hay may also refer to:

- David Hay (cardiologist) (1927–2016), New Zealand cardiologist and anti-smoking campaigner
- David Hay (curler) (born 1962), Scottish curler
- David Hay (diplomat) (1916–2009), Australian diplomat and public servant
- David Hay (engineer) (1859–1938), British civil engineer
- David Hay (nurseryman) (1815–1883), New Zealand nurseryman
- David Hay (Australian politician) (born 1933), member of the New South Wales Legislative Assembly
- David Hay (Auckland politician) (born 1947 or 1948), New Zealand politician and businessman
- David Davidson Hay (1828–1908), Canadian politician
- David Ramsay Hay (1798–1866), Scottish decorator and colour theorist

== See also ==
- David de la Hay (c. 1318–1346), Lord High Constable of Scotland
- David Haye (born 1980), British boxer
- David Hays (disambiguation)
- David Hey (1938–2016), English historian
- David Hayes (disambiguation)
