= Heise =

Heise may refer to:

== People with the surname ==
- Bob Heise (born 1947), American Major League Baseball player
- David R. Heise (born 1937), American sociologist
- Georg Arnold Heise (1778–1851), an influential German legal scholar
- Peter Arnold Heise (1830–1879), Danish composer (Drot og marsk, "King and Marshal")
- Philip Heise (born 1991), German footballer
- Taylor Heise (born 2000), American ice hockey player
- William Heise, American film director, The Kiss (1896)

== Other ==
- Heise, Idaho, a community in the United States
- Heise (company), German publishing house (including Heise Online)

== See also ==
- Crane–Heise syndrome, lethal birth defect
- Heise volcanic field, volcanic field in Idaho, United States
