= Michael Hayes =

Michael, Mike or Mick Hayes may refer to:

== Politicians ==
- Michael Hayes (politician) (1889–1976), Irish Fine Gael politician
- Michael D. Hayes (born 1951), American member of Michigan House of Representatives

== Military figures ==
- Michael Joseph Hayes (1894–1918), U.S. Army officer killed in World War 1
- J. Michael Hayes (fl. 1996), U.S. Marine Corps general

== Others ==
- Michael Angelo Hayes (1820–1877), Irish watercolourist who specialised in painting horses and military subjects
- Michael Hayes (wrestler) (born 1959), American wrestler
- Michael Hayes (mass shooter) (born 1964), North Carolina (USA) mass shooter whose case sparked controversy over the insanity defense
- Michael Hayes (TV series), an American TV series
- Mickie Most (Michael Peter Hayes, 1938–2003), English record producer
- Mike Hayes (businessman), English businessman
- Mike Hayes (fighter) (born 1980), American mixed martial artist
- Michael Hayes (director) (1929–2014), British TV director
- Michael Hayes (Canadian football) (born 1990), American gridiron football player
- Mick Hayes (hurler) (1921–2003), Irish hurler
- Mick Hayes (musician) (born 1978), American singer-songwriter and guitarist
