= O'Hea =

O'Hea may refer to:

- Charles O'Hea (1814-1903), Irish Catholic priest active in Australia
- John Fergus O'Hea (c. 1838–1922), Irish cartoonist
- Matt O'Hea, Australian basketball player
- Patrick O'Hea (1848-?), Irish politician
- Timothy O'Hea (1843-1874), Irish soldier and explorer

In Munster in Ireland the O'Heas of that province, where they had their own lands in Carbery known as Pobble O'Hea, and their own castle, are earliest mentioned a sept of the O'Donovan family, and genetic evidence fully supports the claim as they also belong to Y-DNA clade R-A2220. The O'Heas of Munster have since frequently anglicized their name to Hayes.

According to historian C. Thomas Cairney, the O'Heas were one of the chiefly families of the Corca Laoghdne tribe who in turn came from the Erainn tribe who were the second wave of Celts to settle in Ireland from 500 to 100 BC.

== See also ==
- Dál gCais
- Corcu Loígde
- Hayes (surname)
- Irish clans
