= Thorsten Teichert =

German economist

- Born: 1963 (age 62–63); Berlin
- Occupation: Economist

Thorsten Teichert (born 1963 in Berlin) is a German economist and Professor of Business Administration, especially marketing and innovation at the Faculty of Economic and Social Sciences of the University of Hamburg.

== Biography ==
Thorsten Teichert studied engineering at Technische Universität Berlin and received his Diplom in engineering. Subsequently, he obtained his MBA from Union College in Schenectady, New York.

In 1993 Teichert obtained his PhD at the University of Kiel with the thesis "Erfolgspotential internationaler F-&-E-Kooperationen." (The potential success of international Research & Development cooperations). After graduation Teichert was Research Fellow at the Fuqua School of Business in Durham (North Carolina) in the United States.

In 2000 he obtained his Habilitation at the WHU – Otto Beisheim School of Management in Koblenz with the thesis "Nutzenschätzung in Conjoint-Analysen. Theoretische Fundierung und empirische Aussagekraft" (Benefit estimation in conjoint analysis. Theoretical foundation and empirical significance).

Thorsten Teichert acts as Head of the Marketing and Innovation at the Institute of Marketing and Media at the University of Hamburg. He is also Professor at the R&D Management study at the University of Stuttgart. Teichert is director of the Institute for Innovation Management at the University of Bern as well as honorary member and Visiting Professor at the University of Technology, Sydney.

Teichert has worked in industry as assistant to the CEO at the INPRO GmbH in Berlin. Moreover, Teichert was head of staff department Corporate Development at ThyssenKrupp in Düsseldorf. He has works as research consultant in the area of technology and innovation management, particularly for patent analysis and issues of new product development.

== Research Areas ==
His scientific focus is new product development and technology marketing, strategic technology and R&D management, market development, internationalization and networks, theory of innovation management programs, particularly empirical research approaches and radical innovations, time and diffusion strategies.

Other research priorities include market-driven new product development, organizational innovation and interface management, technological competition analysis, and using patent data and surveys on consumer behavior.

== Publications ==
- 1994. Erfolgspotential internationaler F-&-E-Kooperationen. PhD thesis University of Kiel, 1993. Wiesbaden: Springer.
- 2001. Nutzenschätzung in Conjoint-Analysen. Theoretische Fundierung und empirische Aussagekraft, Habilitation thesis, 2000. Deutscher Universitäts-Verlag.
- 2011. Volker Trommsdorff & Thorsten Teichert. Konsumentenverhalten. Stuttgart: Kohlhammer Verlag

Articles, a selection

- Brockhoff, Klaus, and Thorsten Teichert. "Cooperative RD and partners measures of success." International Journal of Technology Management 10.1 (1995): 111–123.
- Von Wartburg, Iwan, Thorsten Teichert, and Katja Rost. "Inventive progress measured by multi-stage patent citation analysis." Research Policy 34.10 (2005): 1591–1607.
- Pilkington, Alan, and Thorsten Teichert. "Management of technology: themes, concepts and relationships." Technovation 26.3 (2006): 288–299.
