= Nitish Jain =

Indian educationist and philanthropist

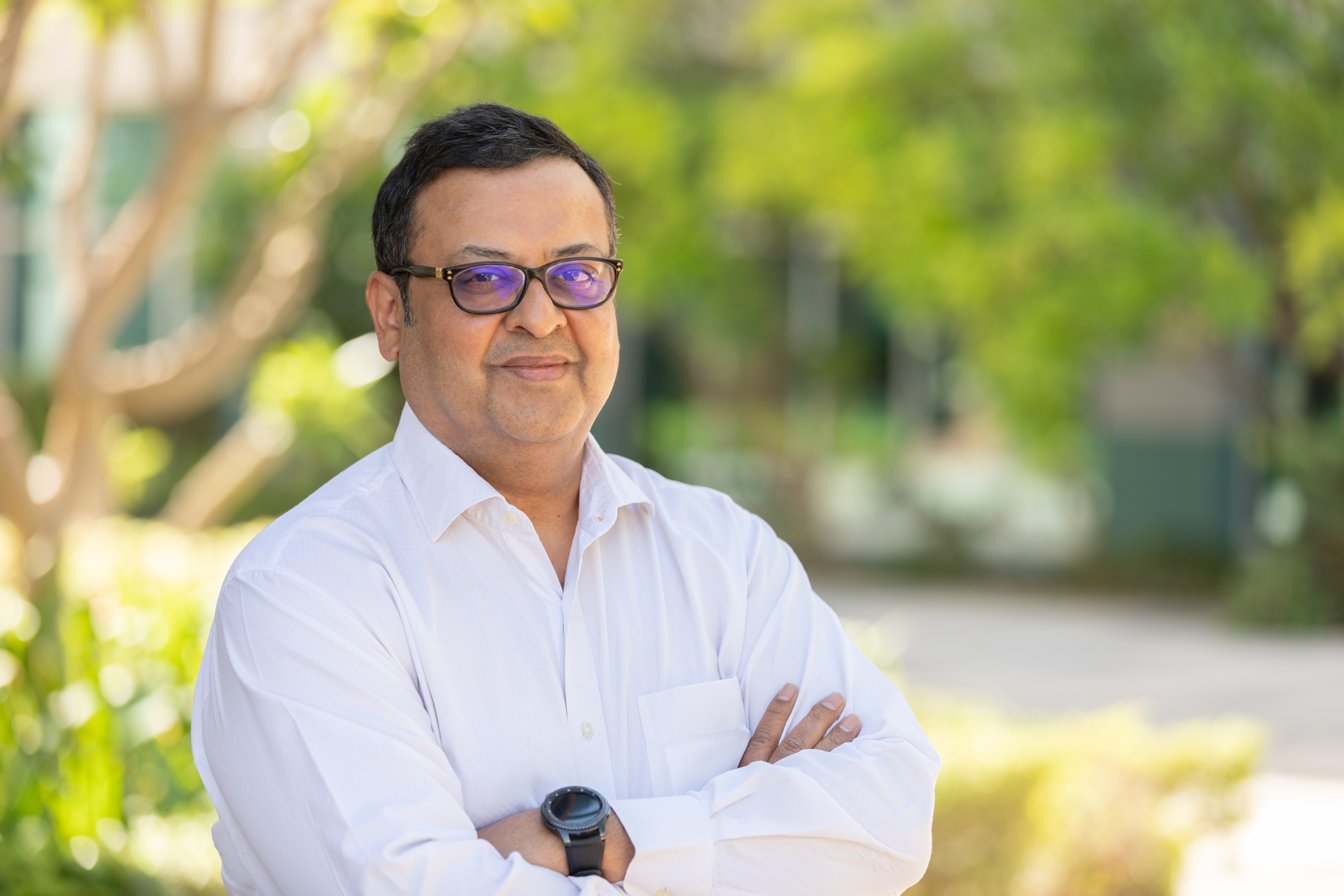
- Nitish at the SP Jain Dubai campus in June 2019
- Born: 15 February 1961 (age 65)
- Education: Cornell University, USA
- Occupation: Businessman
- Spouse: Bapsy Jain
- Children: Samarth Jain, Gaurav Jain

Nitish Jain (born 15 February 1961) is an Indian educationist, philanthropist, and President of S P Jain School of Global Management (S P Jain), a global business school. Under Nitish's leadership, S P Jain is credited with pioneering a multi-city learning model and developing a proprietorial software for the delivery of online education.

In 2014, he was one of the several CEOs of delegation met by the Indian Prime Minister Narendra Modi in Australia during his visit to the G20 summit.

In 2016, Nitish was named 'Game Changer in Education' in Forbes magazine's Middle East edition and subsequently in 2017, by the CEO Middle East.

== S P Jain School of Global Management ==
The school has multi-city residential undergraduate and postgraduate programs, including a Global MBA program. The school also offers an executive MBA program, a doctoral program for senior business professionals and a number of executive education and short-term online programs.

Nitish's contributions, impact in EdTech and leadership have led to SP Jain's ranking among the world's best by:

- Forbes (2019–21): ranked in the World's Top 15
- Forbes (2017–19): ranked in the World's Top 20
- The Economist (2015): ranked in the Global Top 100 in the World
- Forbes, USA: Best International 1 Year programs (2015–2016): ranked #10 in the world
- Poets and Quants, USA (2015)>|: ranked #33 in the world
- Forbes, USA: Best International Business School (2013–2014): ranked #19 in the world (outside the US)
- Nielsen (2014): no. 1 MBA salary audit in U. A. E.
- Financial Times, UK (2011 and 2012): top 100 Global MBA Programs in the world

== In the media ==
Nitish has been interviewed by international publications and broadcast media like the Sydney Morning Post, Bloomberg TV (Hong Kong and India), BBC (Singapore), Zee TV (Singapore), Khaleej Times (Dubai), and Channel 9 News and the Australian (Australia). He has been an invited keynote speaker at international conferences, such as 2017 EFMD Global Network Asia Annual Conference held in Indonesia on the theme of 3D Management in Education: Quality, Technology and Future Leadership and the 2nd World Disruptive Innovation Summit 2019 in Singapore.

== Personal life ==
Nitish is married to Bapsy Jain, an author and entrepreneur. Together, they have two sons, Samarth and Gaurav.
