= Jack R. Meredith =

Jack R. Meredith (born 1939) is an American engineer, organizational theorist, management consultant and Professor of Management at Wake Forest University, known for his work on project management.

== Biography ==
Meredith obtained his BA in Engineering and Mathematics early 1960s from Oregon State University and obtained both his PhD and MBA from University of California, Berkeley.

Meredith started his career in the 1960s in industry as astrodynamicist at Douglas Aircraft Company, and TRW Inc., where he participated in the Apollo program and Viking program. Furthermore, he work at Ampex Corporation and Hewlett-Packard before he returned to the academica in 1976 to the University of Cincinnati, where he became Director of the Operations and Industrial Management Department. In 1995 he moved to the Schools of Business of the Wake Forest University, where he was appointed Professor of Management and Broyhill Distinguished Scholar and Chair in Operations.

From 1994 to 2002 Meredith was Editor-in-Chief of the Journal of Operations Management, and he is founding Editor-in-Chief of the Operations Management Research journal.

== Publications ==
Meredith has authored and co-authored numerous publications in the field of Management of technology, Operations management, Manufacturing strategy and Enterprise engineering. Books, a selection:

- Meredith, Jack R., and Samuel J. Mantel Jr. Project management: a managerial approach. Wiley. com, 2011.

Articles, a selection:

- McCutcheon, David M., and Jack R. Meredith. "Conducting case study research in operations management." Journal of Operations Management 11.3 (1993): 239–256.
- Meredith, J. R., Raturi, A., Amoako-Gyampah, K., & Kaplan, B. (1989). "Alternative research paradigms in operations." Journal of operations management, 8(4), 297–326.
- Meredith, Jack R., and Marianne M. Hill. Justifying new manufacturing systems: a managerial approach. Scott, Foresman & Co., 1990.
- Pilkington, Alan, and Jack R. Meredith. "The evolution of the intellectual structure of operations management—1980–2006: A citation/co-citation analysis." Journal of Operations Management 27.3 (2009): 185–202.
