= Jeremy Hayes =

Jeremy Hayes may refer to:

- Jeremy Hayes (radio editor), BBC News editor
- Jerry Hayes (born 1953), British Conservative politician, MP 1983–1997
