= Frank Hays =

Frank Hays may refer to:

- Frank Kerr Hays (1896–1988), American World War I flying ace
- Frank L. Hays (1922–2003), 35th Lieutenant Governor of Colorado, United States

== See also ==
- Frank Hayes (disambiguation)
