= Chris Hayes (disambiguation) =

Chris Hayes (born 1979) is an American journalist.

Chris Hayes may also refer to:

- Chris Hayes (American football) (born 1972), American football player
- Chris Hayes (ice hockey) (born 1946), Canadian ice hockey player
- Chris Hayes (jockey) (born 1987), Irish jockey
- Chris Hayes, American musician with Huey Lewis and the News, 1980–2001
- Chris Hayes (politician) (born 1955), Australian politician
- Chris Hayes (skydiver), Canadian skydiver
- Chris Hayes (baseball) (born 1973), American college baseball coach
- Christopher Hayes (figure skater), American ice dancer, see 1999 United States Figure Skating Championships

== See also ==
- Chris Hay (born 1974), Scottish footballer
