= David Hays =

David Hays may refer to:

- David Hays (cricketer) (1944–2025), English-born Scottish cricketer
- David Hays (academic), 15th–16th century British academic
- David G. Hays (1928–1995), linguist, computer scientist and social scientist
- David Hays (scenic designer) (1930–2026), American scenic and lighting designer

== See also ==
- David Hayes (disambiguation)
- David Hay (disambiguation)
