= Jeremy Hayes (radio editor) =

Jeremy Hayes is a senior executive and former News Editor who works for the British Broadcasting Corporation.

Jeremy Hayes was educated at the University of Edinburgh and graduated M.A ( Hons) in Mental Philosophy. He joined BBC News in 1987 after starting as a freelance reporter for the consumer affairs programme 'You & Yours' and 'Network UK'on BBC World Service, and as a researcher for "The Friday Alternative" Channel 4. Until 2012 he was Senior Output Editor for The World Tonight, Radio 4's evening news and current affairs programme. His programme on October 16, 1998, is credited with forcing the hands of the authorities leading to the arrest of General Augusto Pinochet. In August 2006 in the absence of a parliamentary emergency debate on the crisis in the Lebanon, despite many calls from backbenchers, he organised and produced a two-hour debate with MPs according to House of Commons rules which was broadcast in edited form on Radio 4 and continuously online (https://www.bbc.co.uk/radio4/news/recall_parliament.shtml). His programme on the demise of the Rover car company (March 8, 2005) won a Bronze Sony award in 2006 for breaking news. He has also worked on the Today programme, BBC 4 News and BBC World TV. In 2009 he was appointed to the BBC Fellowship at the Reuter's Institute for the Study of Journalism, at Green College, University of Oxford. His subsequent report on the Freedom of Information Act 2000 and its implementation by journalists and government, entitled "A Shock to the System" was published in May 2009. From 2012 to 2013 he was Editor, Rural affairs, BBC Audio and Music, responsible for 'Farming Today','The Food Programme', 'Costing The Earth', 'Open Country', 'Ramblings' and 'On Your Farm'. From January -June 2014 he was Assistant editor, The World at One on BBC Radio 4. Following this he became a senior editorial adviser to the Director of News BBC, and was then seconded to the Office of the Director-General and Chairman of the BBC as an adviser. He is currently Complaints Director, Executive Complaints Unit, BBC.
