= Dorothy Hayes Sater =

American journalist

Dorothy "Dottie" Hayes Sater (March 12, 1931 – March 14, 2012) was a television reporter in Omaha, Nebraska.

== Career ==
As a journalism student at the Municipal University of Omaha, Dorothy joined the staff at WOW Radio and TV in 1952. Although she was classified as a secretary, she worked as a reporter and photographer, and is considered by some to be the first full-time television reporter in Omaha. For a portion of her time at WOW, she was the only woman reporter in Omaha. She was a founding member of the Omaha Press Club and also its first woman president.

She left WOW in 1959 over a pay dispute, and then went to work for the Municipal University of Omaha General Printing and Information Office. She changed jobs several times, and the final career from which she retired was public relations spokesperson for the Immanuel Medical Center in Omaha, Nebraska.

She died in 2012 and posthumously received the Omaha Press Club Foundation Career Achievement Award.
