= Darren Heyes =

English footballer

Darren Heyes (born 11 January 1967) is an English former football Goalkeeper and the son of former Leicester City and Swansea City Goalkeeper, George Heyes.

He represented England at Schoolboy at under 15, 18 and Youth level appearing in the 1985 FIFA World Under 20 Championships in the USSR.

He signed as a professional for Nottingham Forest from 1983 to 1988 as a reserve team player but despite making his reserve team debut aged just 14 years old V Oldham Athletic he never went on to make a first team appearance. Heyes made a number of Football League appearances for Scunthorpe United and Wrexham before joining Halifax Town where he played a further 76 games. Heyes appeared for Great Britain in the 1991 World Student Games and won a Bronze medal with a 2–1 victory against Uruguay and also appeared as a non contract player for Sheffield United, Boston United and Walsall before suffering a horrific double break of his leg in 1999 whilst playing for non league Moor Green who later became known as Solihull Moors.

Heyes recovered sufficiently enough to become the Nottingham Forest Academy Goalkeeping Coach in 1999 before moving across the River Trent in 2002 to become First Team Goalkeeping Coach and Head of Youth Development at Notts County. In 2010 Heyes was appointed as Head of Youth Development and Academy GK Coach at Derby County FC. In June 2011 he was selected for the England over 40 team that achieved third place in the FISA World Veterans Cup in Chaiyaphum, Thailand.

He still turns out regularly for Nottingham Forest Masters in the Sky Sports Masters series and now runs a successful Sports and Playground Company called www.premierplaysolutions.co.uk

Professional rugby player Joe Heyes is the oldest son of Darren Heyes. Joe currently plays for English Premiership side Leicester Tigers.
