= Larry Hayes =

Larry Hayes may refer to:

- Larry Livermore (Lawrence Hayes, born 1947), American musician, record producer, music journalist and author
- Larry Hayes (American football) (1935–2017), American football player
- Larry Allen Hayes (1948–2003), American spree killer
