= John Russell Hayes =

American poet and librarian (1866–1945)

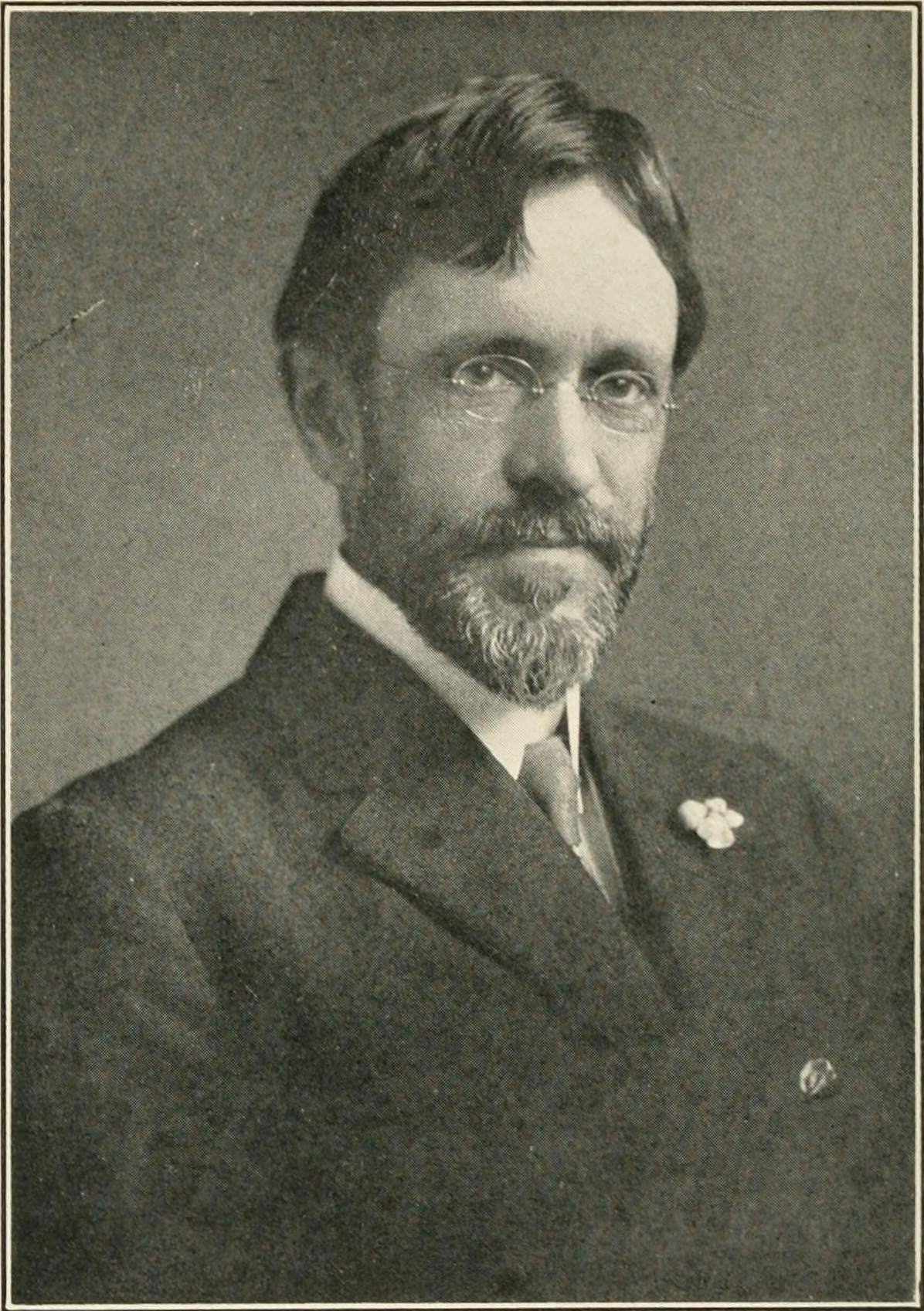
- Born: June 23, 1866; West Chester, Pennsylvania, U.S.
- Died: December 29, 1945 (aged 79); West Chester, Pennsylvania, U.S.
- Education: Swarthmore College; University of Pennsylvania
- Occupations: Librarian, educator, poet
- Employer: Swarthmore College

John Russell Hayes (June 23, 1866 – December 29, 1945) was an American poet, librarian, and educator from Pennsylvania. His poetry generally evoked the region's natural landscapes and Quaker heritage. He served as head librarian at Swarthmore College from 1905 to 1927 and later managed the college's Friends Historical Library.

== Biography ==
Hayes was born in 1866 near West Chester, Pennsylvania, to William M. and Rachel (Russell) Hayes. His family were Quakers and had lived in the region for generations. He grew up on the Hayes family farm on the Brandywine in Embreeville and earned a bachelor's degree from Swarthmore College in 1888 and a Bachelor of Laws degree from the University of Pennsylvania Law School in 1892. He practiced law for a year before becoming an assistant professor of English at Swarthmore College. He also studied at Harvard University, the University of Oxford, and the University of Strasbourg. He was head librarian at Swarthmore from 1906 to 1927. He managed the Friends Historical Library from 1927 to 1935, retiring as Librarian Emeritus.

Hayes married Emma Gawthrop of Wilmington, Delaware, in 1892 and had three daughters, Esther, Katharine, and Eleanor, all of whom studied at Swarthmore. His wife died in 1939. John Russell Hayes died on December 29, 1945, in a West Chester hospital and was buried at the Romansville Friends Meeting cemetery. The Friends Historical Library of Swarthmore College holds his writings and other papers.

== Poetry ==
Hayes wrote about a dozen books, primarily of verse, including the book-length poem The Brandywine (1898). His poetry generally evoked southeastern Pennsylvania's landscapes, his bucolic childhood memories, and his Quaker heritage. He read many poems at memorials and other public occasions. His best-known book is Old Quaker Meeting Houses (Biddle Press, 1910). A complete collection of his poetry was published in 1916.
