= Frank Hayes =

Frank Hayes may refer to:

- Frank Hayes (actor) (1871–1923), American comic actor in silent films
- Frank Hayes (unionist) (1882–1948), American labor leader; president of United Mine Workers of America, 1917–1920; Lieutenant Governor of Colorado
- Frank Hayes (jockey) (1901–1923), American jockey
- Frankie Hayes (1914–1955), American baseball player
- Frank Hayes (cricketer) (born 1946), English cricketer
- Frank Hayes (musician), American folk musician and information technology writer
- Francis B. Hayes, lawyer, state senator, and landowner who lived in Lexington, Massachusetts
- Frank L. Hayes (1893–1967), American football and basketball player and coach
- T. Frank Hayes (1883–1965), Lieutenant Governor of Connecticut

== See also ==
- Frank Hays (disambiguation)
