= Chris Hayes (skydiver) =

Canadian skydiver

Medal record

Representing Canada

Men's Parachuting

World Championships
| Bronze medal – third place | 2006 Vienna, Austria | Canopy Piloting (speed) |

Chris Hayes is a Canadian skydiver. Hayes is noted for having won the bronze medal in speed canopy piloting at the first Canopy Piloting World Parachuting Championships in Vienna, Austria in 2006.
