= Trent Hayes =

- Born: Sydney, Australia
- Occupations: Author, business coach
- Writing career
- Period: 2010–present
- Genre: Non-fiction
- Website: www.trenthayes.com

Trent Hayes (born in Sydney) is an Australian author and project manager whose first published book, Stainless, (co-written with Shannon Lush) was released in 2010. It is a how-to book in understanding Lush's stain removal techniques.

Trent Hayes' projects have included Fiona McIntosh's fantasy website and the official homepage of Jennifer Fleming and Shannon Lush.

From 2011 to present, he has become active in assisting Startups and aspiring authors via competitions on his Facebook page and through his business; iLoveSimple. His approach has a similar direction to his sister Shannon in 'unfuddling' various topics (in his case technology, online business and assisting home businesses via copywriting and marketing services, rather than domestic tips, as his sister does)

== Bibliography ==
Books

- Stainless (2010), Publisher: ABC Books, ISBN 978-0-7333-2791-9
