= David Hayes (Australian footballer) =

Australian rules footballer

Personal information
- Born: 23 January 1949 (age 77)
- Original team: St Kilda CBC
- Height: 188 cm (6 ft 2 in)
- Weight: 89 kg (196 lb)

Playing career^{1}
Years	Club	Games (Goals)
1969	Melbourne	1 (0)
- ^{1} Playing statistics correct to the end of 1969.

David Hayes (born 23 January 1949) is a former Australian rules footballer who played with Melbourne in the Victorian Football League (VFL).
