= Sean Hayes (disambiguation) =

Sean Hayes (born 1970) is an American actor best known for his role as Jack McFarland in the sitcom Will & Grace.

Sean Hayes may also refer to:

- Seán Hayes (Cork politician) (1884–1941), otherwise known as John Hayes, Sinn Féin member of Dáil Éireann
- Seán Hayes (Tipperary politician) (1890–1968), Fianna Fáil TD for Tipperary, later a senator
- Seán Hayes (Gaelic footballer) (born 1960), retired Gaelic footballer who played for Cork
- Sean Hayes (musician) (born 1969), American singer-songwriter

== See also ==
- "Sean and Hayes", American comedians and writers Sean Clements and Hayes Davenport, who host the Hollywood Handbook podcast
