= Kléber Haye =

French engineer and politician (1937–2023)

Deputy of the French National Assembly for Gironde's 7th constituency
- In office 21 July 1981 – 1 April 1986
- Preceded by: Pierre Lataillade
- Succeeded by: proportional representation Pierre Ducout (1988)

Personal details
- Born: 26 April 1937 Ardin, France
- Died: 4 January 2023 (aged 85)
- Party: PS
- Education: University of Bordeaux; École nationale supérieure d'électronique, informatique, télécommunications, mathématique et mécanique de Bordeaux
- Occupation: Engineer

Kléber Haye (26 April 1937 – 4 January 2023) was a French engineer and politician of the Socialist Party (PS).

== Biography ==
=== Education and early career ===
Haye earned an agrégation in physics from the University of Bordeaux and a doctorate in electronic sciences from the École nationale supérieure d'électronique, informatique, télécommunications, mathématique et mécanique de Bordeaux. He then worked as an electrical engineer and was also an assistant professor at the Institut universitaire de technologie de Bordeaux.

=== Political career ===
Haye served as deputy mayor of Villenave-d'Ornon from 1977 to 1983 and also served as secretary-general of the Fédération socialiste de Gironde. In 1981, he was elected to the National Assembly from Gironde's 7th constituency, succeeding fellow socialist Pierre Lataillade. His mandate ended in 1986.

Also in 1981, Haye was elected to the Regional Council of Aquitaine, where he served until 1998.

=== Death ===
Kléber Haye died on 4 January 2023, at the age of 85.
