= Catherine Liston-Heyes =

Canadian economist

Catherine Liston-Heyes (born c.1966) is a Canadian economist, professor at the University of Ottawa and director of its Graduate School of Public and International Affairs. She is particularly known for her work on Competition and regulation.

== Biography ==
Liston-Heyes obtained her BA in economics in 1988 at the University of Ottawa, and her PhD in economics in 1992 at the McGill University.

After graduation Liston-Heyes was associate professor at the Royal Holloway, University of London from 1993 to 2011, where she was also PhD director of the Accounting, Finance and Economics group, and later chaired that group. She has been visiting professor at universities in London, Hong Kong, New York and Singapore. In 2011 she returned to Canada and became professor and director of its University of Ottawa's Graduate School of Public and International Affairs.

== Publications ==
Liston-Heyes has published several articles in the fields of her research interests "Economic Regulation, Charitable giving, Corporate Social Responsibility and Self-Regulation, Economic analysis of non governmental organizations, Consumer protection, and Public procurement." A selection:

- Cairns, Robert D., and Catherine Liston-Heyes. "Competition and regulation in the taxi industry." Journal of Public Economics 59.1 (1996): 1-15.
- Pilkington, Alan, and Catherine Liston-Heyes. "Is production and operations management a discipline? A citation/co-citation study." International Journal of Operations & Production Management 19.1 (1999): 7-20.
- Liston-Heyes, Catherine, and Anthony Heyes. "Recreational benefits from the Dartmoor national park." Journal of Environmental Management 55.2 (1999): 69-80.
- Vazquez, Diego A., and Catherine Liston-Heyes. "Corporate discourse and environmental performance in Argentina." Business Strategy and the Environment 17.3 (2008): 179-193.
- Liu, Gordon, Catherine Liston-Heyes, and Wai-Wai Ko. "Employee participation in cause-related marketing strategies: A study of management perceptions from British consumer service industries." Journal of Business Ethics 92.2 (2010): 195-210.
