= Jack Heyes =

English footballer

Personal information
- Full name: James Heyes
- Date of birth: 1902
- Place of birth: Northwich, England
- Position: Inside forward

Senior career*
| Years | Team | Apps | (Gls) |
| 1924–1925 | Northwich Victoria | | |
| 1925–1927 | Sunderland | 3 | (0) |
| 1927 | West Ham United | 0 | (0) |
| 1927–1928 | Connah's Quay & Shotton | | |
| 1928–1929 | Bangor City | | |
| 1929–1930 | Ashton National | | |
| 1930–193? | Mossley | | |
- * Club domestic league appearances and goals

James Heyes (born 1902) was an English professional footballer who played as an inside forward for Sunderland.
