= Crane–Heise syndrome =

Lethal birth defect

The Crane–Heise syndrome is a very rare and lethal birth defect without a known cause. It was first described in a 1981 publication, and its main signs are facial malformations, lack of bone mineralization, and musculoskeletal anomalies.

== Symptoms ==
According to a 2011 publication that summarizes the nine known cases, the leading symptoms are:

- restricted intrauterine growth
- craniofacial malformation
- lacking mineralization of the calvarium (skull without the lower jaw)
- cleft lip or palate
- small jaws (micrognathism)
- abnormally large distance between the eyes (hypertelorism)
- malformation of the ears
- feet malposition
- absent clavicles
- genitourinary malformations

== Aetiology and differential diagnosis ==
The clustering of the cases suggests an autosomal recessive disorder (see genetical dominance). In the aminopterin-syndrome sine aminopterin syndrome (ASSAS), a poorly mineralized calvarium is present, too, but many other tell-tale symptoms of Crane–Heise are lacking. A similar disease is cleidocranial dysplasia, but this is an autosomal dominant disease caused by mutations in the RUNX2 gene – and such mutations have not been found in Crane–Heise cases. Chromosomal abnormalities are also absent in the Crane–Heise syndrome.

== Diagnosis ==
As the cause is still unknown, the only diagnostic is ultrasound, which can detect a lack of skull mineralization by the 10th week of pregnancy.
