= George Heyes =

English footballer

Personal information
- Full name: George Heyes
- Date of birth: 16 November 1937 (age 88)
- Place of birth: Bolton, England
- Position: Goalkeeper

Senior career*
Years	Team	Apps	(Gls)
- Rochdale
1960–1966	Leicester City	27	
	Swansea City	99	
- Barrow
- Bedford Town
- Hereford United
Total		174	
- * Club domestic league appearances and goals

George Heyes (born 16 November 1937) is an English professional goalkeeper who spent a large part of his career at Leicester City. Heyes made a total 174 Football League appearances over a 13-year professional career. Heyes spent six seasons with the Foxes in the First Division from July 1960 to September 1966 and was back-up for World Cup Winner Gordon Banks and played a total 27 matches in league and cup competitions.

Heyes arrived at Filbert Street at a challenging time with Banks, the England goalkeeper, in goal, Heyes still performed well when called upon. He arrived at the club from Rochdale, his first professional club, but eventually had to leave when Peter Shilton, then aged just 16, pushed him for his reserve team place.

Bolton-born Heyes eventually moved on to Swansea, but only after Leicester delayed his move due to an injury to Banks, which saw Heyes take the number one jersey for the opening nine matches of the 1965-66 campaign. Heyes went on to play 99 times for the Welsh club alongside Welsh footballing legends John Charles and Ivor Allchurch.

His switch to Wales saw him gain more regular first-team action and he actually won a Welsh Cup winner's medal in that debut campaign for the Swans. Moves to Barrow, Bedford Town and Hereford United followed.

George Heyes is father of former professional goalkeeper Darren Heyes and grandfather to professional rugby player Joe Heyes who plays as tighthead prop for Leicester Tigers
