= Klaus Brockhoff =

German economist

Klaus Brockhoff (born 16 October 1939) is a German economist, organizational theorist and Emeritus Professor at the University of Kiel.

== Biography ==
Born in Koblenz Brockhoff studied economics at the University of Bonn, where he received his MA in 1962. In 1965 he received his PhD in economics with a thesis on corporate growth and product range changes. A year later, he obtained another MA in Business Administration at the University of Münster. From 1967 to 1968 he was granted a postdoctoral fellowship from the German Research Foundation to be Visiting Scholar at the University of California, Berkeley. Back in Germany in 1968 he obtained his habilitation at the University of Bonn with a thesis on R&D projects and program planning.

After his graduation in Bonn Brockhoff had started his academic career as Assistant Professor at the Department of Horst Albach in 1962. After his habilitation in 1968 he joined the research and consulting institute Battelle, where he soon became head of a larger unit. In 1970 he joined the University of Kiel, where would spend the rest of his academic career, almost 30 years. He started in 1970 as Chair of Business Administration, and mid-1970s held the Chair of General Economics. When in 1978 in Kiel the study program in Business Administration was introduced, and specialized Chairs where created, Brockhoff choose the Chair in Marketing. Around 1989 he accepted the new Chair of Technology and Innovation Management, the first of its kind in Germany. From 1999 to 2004 he was Dean of the WHU – Otto Beisheim School of Management. Since his retirement he acts there as honorary professor.

Brockhoff was advisor in the graduation of over 60 students and educated five Academics, which holds Chairs at German universities hold: Helmut Schmale at the University of Passau, Sönke Albers (University of Kiel), Ursula Weisenfeld-Schenk (University of Lüneburg), Holger Ernst ( WHU), and Thorsten Teichert (University of Hamburg).

=== Honours ===
- 1991. Max Planck Research Award
- 1993. Karl Heinz Beckurts price for his life's work in innovation management
- 1997. Fellow of the Berlin-Brandenburg Academy of Sciences
- 2000. Fellow of the European Academy of Sciences and Arts.
- 2000s. Fellow of the Academy of Technical Sciences Acatech.
- 2003. Honorary Doctorate at the University of Bern for his scientific achievements
- 2009. PICMET Leadership in Technology Management Award.

== Work ==
Klaus Brockhoff is known not only as outstanding scientist, but also for his contributions to the Science of Management. From 1981 to 1983 he was Chairman of the Commission on Marketing in the Verband der Hochschullehrer für Betriebswirtschaft (Association of University Professors in Management).

From 1989 to 1991 he served as Chairman of the Association. Because of its many scientific and political activities from 1991 to 1994 he was a member of the German Council of Science and Humanities. From 1997 to 2007 he was a member of the Board of Trustees of the Volkswagen Foundation and head of its wealth advisory board.

He is currently Vice Chairman of the WHU Foundation and member of the Board of Trustees of Esche Schümann Commichau Stiftung. In addition, he was and is member of various supervisory boards, such as Metro AG or and the Steuler Holding GmbH.

== Publications ==
Books, a selection:

- Brockhoff, Klaus. Produktpolitik. Vol. 1079. G. Fischer, 1993.
- Brockhoff, Klaus. Forschung und Entwicklung. Vol. 3. München u. a.: Oldenbourg, 1999.
- Brockhoff, Klaus, and Jürgen Hauschildt. Schnittstellenmanagement-Koordination ohne Hierarachie?. Inst. für Betriebswirtschaftslehre, 1993.

Articles, a selection:

- Brockhoff, Klaus. "The performance of forecasting groups in computer dialogue and face-to-face discussion." The Delphi method: Techniques and applications (1975): 291–321.
- Brockhoff, Klaus. "R&D cooperation between firms—a perceived transaction cost perspective." Management Science 38.4 (1992): 514–524.
- Brockhoff, Klaus, and Thorsten Teichert. "Cooperative RD and partners measures of success." International Journal of Technology Management 10.1 (1995): 111–123.
- Brockhoff, Klaus. "Customers' perspectives of involvement in new product development." International Journal of Technology Management 26.5 (2003): 464–481.
