= Joe Heyes =

England international rugby union player

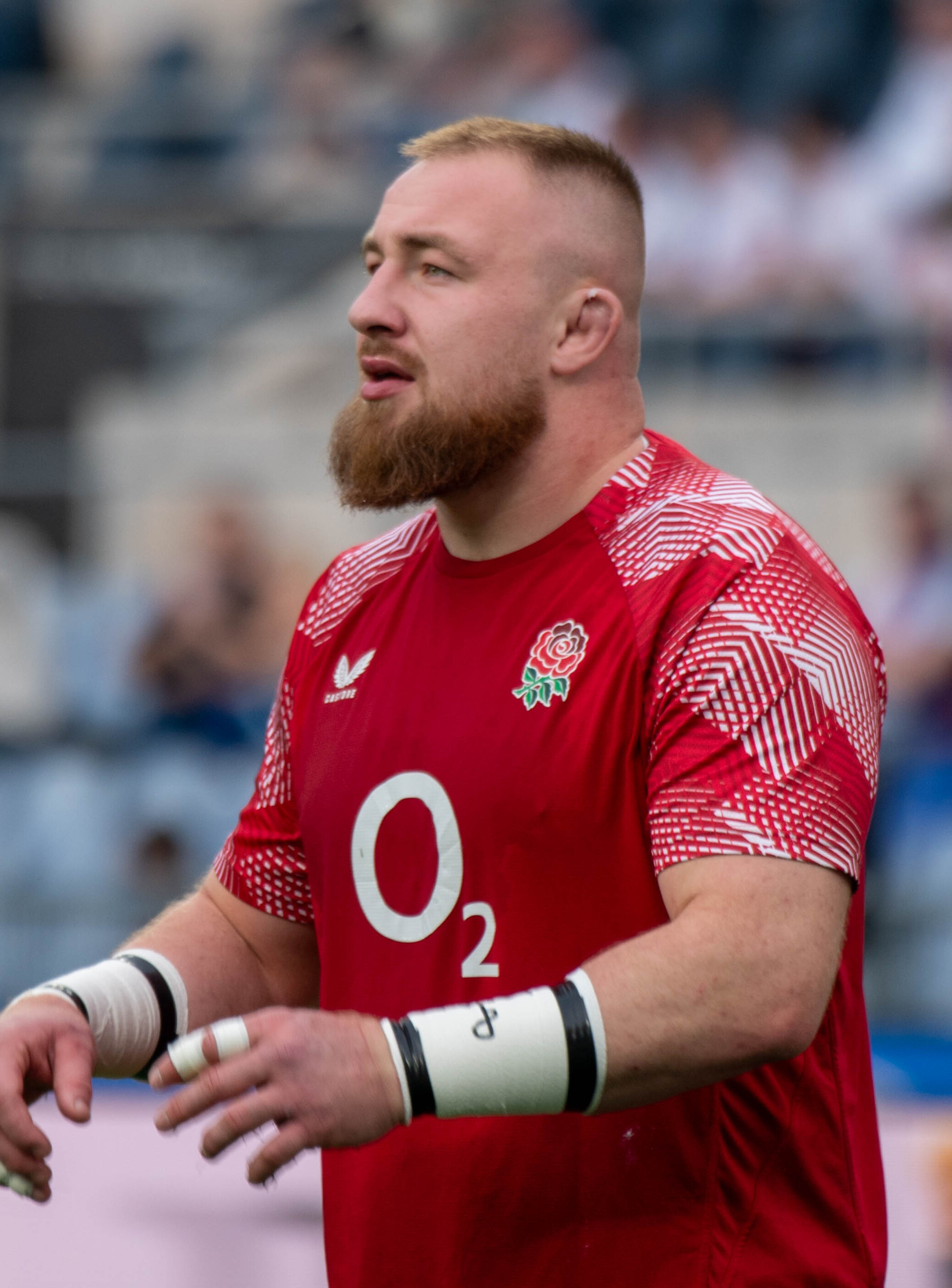
- Heyes with England in 2026
- Full name: Joseph Connor Rhys Heyes
- Born: 13 April 1999 (age 27) Nottingham, Nottinghamshire, England
- Height: 1.91 m (6 ft 3 in)
- Weight: 126 kg (278 lb; 19 st 12 lb)
- School: Toot Hill School; Wyggeston and Queen Elizabeth I College
- Notable relatives: Darren Heyes (father); George Heyes (grandfather)

Rugby union career
- Position: Prop
- Current team: Leicester Tigers
Senior career
Years	Team	Apps	(Points)
2018–	Leicester Tigers	188	(30)
- Correct as of 1 November 2026
International career
Years	Team	Apps	(Points)
2017	England U18	9	(5)
2018–2019	England U20	17	(15)
2021–	England	26	(10)
2024	England A	3	(5)
- Correct as of 15 March 2026

Joseph Connor Rhys Heyes (born 13 April 1999) is an English professional rugby union player who plays as a prop for Premiership Rugby club Leicester Tigers and the England national team. He was a Premiership Rugby champion in 2022.

== Club career ==
Heyes began playing rugby at age 14, originally a football goalkeeper for Nottingham Forest he initially played outside centre for Nottingham Moderns RFC and then moved to Newark before joining Leicester Tigers academy at 16 and switching position to prop. Heyes was loaned to Loughborough Students RUFC in the 2017/18 National One season and featured in 17 games.

Heyes made his debut for Leicester Tigers on 16 September 2018 against Wasps at the Ricoh Arena in a 35–41 defeat in round three of the 2018–19 Premiership Rugby season. After a seven-minute cameo in Leicester's 23–15 win against Northampton Saints at Twickenham Heyes was named in RUGBYPASS's team of the week.

On 21 June 2019 Heyes signed a new contract with Leicester. In May 2021 Heyes was a second-half substitute as Leicester were defeated by Montpellier in the final of the European Rugby Challenge Cup. Heyes made his 100th Leicester Tigers appearance on 11 June 2022 against Northampton Saints in the Gallagher Premiership Semi-Final, the youngest prop in professional club era history to do so, aged just 23. Heyes played as a replacement in the 2022 Premiership Rugby final as Tigers beat Saracens 15-12. On 17th May 2026, Heyes received his Leicester Tigers cap to mark his 100th start for the club at the age of only 27. On the 30th June 2026, Joe Heyes extended his contract at Leicester Tigers.

== International career ==
Heyes is eligible to play for both England, through birth, and Ireland, through his mother.

He was named in the England under 20s squad for the 2018 World Rugby Under 20 Championship and scored in the final as England finished runners up to hosts France. The following year saw Heyes score a try against Wales to secure a fifth-place finish at the 2019 World Rugby Under 20 Championship.

In October 2020 Heyes was called up to a senior England training squad by head coach Eddie Jones and in January 2021 he was called into the shadow squad of the England Senior Test team for the 2021 Six Nations. Heyes made his full England debut on 4 July 2021 against the United States at Twickenham. Heyes has toured three times with England Mens Rugby Union Team. Winning the Australia Tour in 2022, Japan and New Zealand Tour in 2024, and the Americas Tour in 2025, winning the player of the tour. In 2026, Heyes was awarded England Men's Player of the Season.

=== List of international tries ===
As of 8 November 2026

Try	Opposing team	Location	Venue	Competition	Date	Result	Score
1	Australia	London, England	Twickenham Stadium	2026 Nations Championship	8 November 2026	Win	45–22

== Personal life ==
Heyes is the son of former professional footballer Darren Heyes and Rachel Heyes, former Ireland Women's Basketball Player. his grandfathers are George Heyes, a former professional footballer for Leicester City and Swansea City, and Bob Rees, a former British record holder in long jump. Heyes was a regular team mascot during his father's time as Goalkeeping Coach at Notts County. Heyes has shared his interest and love of history and gardening on various social media channels, seeing it as an excellent way to unwind from Rugby's physical and mental demands.
