= Mark Hayes (composer) =

American composer and arranger (born 1953)

- Born: 28 March 1953 (age 73); Ladysmith, Wisconsin, U.S.
- Education: Baylor University
- Occupations: Composer, arranger, conductor, concert pianist
- Known for: Choral & piano arrangements of sacred music, works regularly featured at ACDA, MENC & Chorus America conventions
- Awards: Recurring recipient of the Standard Award from ASCAP, Dove Award for Praise and Worship Album of the Year in 1986
- Website: markhayes.com

Mark Hayes (born March 28, 1953) is an American composer and arranger. His predominant output is of choral music in the Christian sacred music and gospel music genres.

== Biography ==
Hayes was born in Ladysmith, Wisconsin, and attended elementary school in Normal, Illinois. After receiving a bachelor's degree in piano performance magna cum laude from Baylor University in 1975, he entered a career in composing and arranging music. Hayes moved to Kansas City in the late 1970s.

Hayes' influence in the sacred choral and piano genres have brought him international recognition.

== Works ==
Hayes has written numerous choral arrangements of sacred music and has more than 1,000 publications. He has also published several books of arrangements for solo singers and solo piano, including 10 Christmas Songs for Solo Voice, 10 Spirituals for Solo Voice, and 10 Hymns and Gospel Songs for Solo Voice.

In 2004, Hayes premiered a contemporary setting of the ancient hymn Te Deum at Carnegie Hall, set for choir and soloists.

== Awards ==
He is a recurring recipient of the Standard Award from ASCAP, and was given the Dove Award for Praise and Worship Album of the Year in 1986. He also received the Award for Exemplary Leadership in Christian Music from Baylor University Center for Christian Music Studies.
