= David Hayes (author) =

Canadian academic (born 1953)

- Born: 1953 (age 72–73)
- Occupations: Feature writer; author; editor; teacher
- Employer: University of King's College
- Awards: National Magazine Awards; Amnesty International Media Award
- Website: davidhayes.ca

David Hayes (born 1953) is a Canadian feature writer, author, editor and teacher. He has written, co-written, or ghostwritten 13 nonfiction books and frequently works as a substantive editor. His articles, essays and reviews have appeared in many publications, among them Saturday Night, Report on Business, The Globe and Mail, Reader's Digest, The New York Times Magazine, The Walrus, Chatelaine, The Guardian, enRoute, Toronto Life (he was the magazine's media columnist in the late 1980s), and National Post Business (he served as senior writer from August 2001 until April 2003). He has won nine National Magazine Awards (Gold, Silver and Honourable Mentions) and, in 2009, an Amnesty International Media Award for a feature on refugee children abandoned at Canadian airports, published in Chatelaine.

He began teaching in the School of Journalism at Toronto's Ryerson University (now Toronto Metropolitan University) in the late 1980s and he was an assistant professor on faculty there from 1995 to 2002. At that time, he returned to full-time journalism and taught Advanced Feature Writing in Toronto Metropolitan University's G. Raymond Chang School of Continuing Studies from 2003 to 2018. He has been on the faculty of the University of King's College's Master of Fine Arts (MFA) in Creative Nonfiction since 2013.

He gives workshops, lectures and appears on panels relating to feature writing, researching, reporting, and interviewing techniques and other aspects of journalism.
