= Old Salisbury Road shooting =

1988 mass shooting in North Carolina, US

- Location: Winston-Salem, North Carolina, US
- Date: July 17, 1988; 11:00 p.m. – 11:45 p.m.
- Attack type: Mass shooting
- Weapon: .22-caliber semi-automatic rifle
- Deaths: 4
- Injuries: 6 (including the perpetrator)
- Perpetrator: Michael Charles Hayes

The Old Salisbury Road shooting was a mass shooting in Winston-Salem, North Carolina, United States, committed by Michael Charles Hayes (born January 13, 1964) on July 17, 1988. Hayes shot nine people, killing four of them; his subsequent successful use of the insanity defense in courts created a statewide controversy in the early 1990s.

== Background ==
Michael Hayes was born in Winston-Salem in Forsyth County, North Carolina, where he was raised. After beginning to use drugs at age 13, Hayes became known for bullying and self-aggrandizing behavior, fueled by probable mental illness and drug abuse.

After bouncing from job to job, Hayes began to work at a business purchased by his parents. The business, Edwards' Moped Shop, was located on Old Salisbury Road in southern Forsyth County, near the Davidson County line. After he stole funds from the business for a number of months, Hayes' parents threatened to sell the business and stop supporting him, an idea that helped to fuel Hayes' break with reality.

== Shooting ==
After exhibiting unstable behavior for a few weeks, and following police reports of concern over his behavior, Michael Hayes shot nine passersby from the centerline of the darkened road in front of his parents' moped shop on the night of July 17, 1988. Four of those who were shot, Crystal Cantrell, Tom Nicholson, Melinda Hayes, and Ronnie Hull, died. Complicating matters, the moped shop sat near the Forsyth and Davidson County lines, leading to confusion as to which law enforcement agency had jurisdiction.

After the 3rd victim was killed, a sheriff's deputy named Steven McGuire asked a supervisor ''Do I have permission to take him down?'' But the supervisor replied ''No, wait until I get there.'' After which the assailant killed the fourth victim. The mass killing was put to an end when deputies finally returned fire on the assailant, striking him in the groin, leg, and back.

Hayes later testified for his actions by saying that he believed the passersby were demons that needed to be killed: "I thought they were demons, I recognized them because they had red, sunken eyes, and they had a sulfuric stench about them, like they had come up from the pits of hell.”

== Trial, verdict and aftermath ==
Hayes' trial began in Forsyth County on March 27, 1989. The scene became a media circus, resulting in difficulties in trying to seat an impartial jury. The jury reached a verdict of "Not Guilty by Reason of Insanity." Many in the community and state were outraged.

Hayes was committed to the Dorothea Dix State Mental Hospital in Raleigh. At Dix, he was given Haldol, a drug often used to reduce aggression or treat schizophrenia. The psychosis went away, and Hayes went off the drug in 1989. Since then, he has not been on medication for mental illness. Hayes' yearly petitions to be set free are usually met with protest from the victims' families and scrutiny by the media.

As a result of the public outrage at the Hayes verdict, the N.C. General Assembly has made a few attempts to change the law regarding verdicts of "not guilty by reason of insanity." The most notable attempt came in 1998, when a handful of Republicans, outraged by the news that Hayes had fathered a second child while ostensibly in custody at Dix, attempted to introduce a bill that would change an insanity verdict to "guilty but insane." Such a change would allow for incarceration, rather than release, following psychiatric treatment.

== Hospitalization and release ==
The area of the killings has transformed from rural to suburban, with the addition of shopping centers and subdivisions in the years since. The building that housed the moped shop was demolished in the late 1990s to make way for a construction waste landfill. Attempts to erect a memorial to Hayes' victims near the site have been unsuccessful. In September 2007, Hayes was again in the media spotlight after it was revealed that Dix Hospital had allowed him to leave the hospital to work at a Raleigh-area gas station. The gas station fired Hayes after receiving anonymous threats of firebombing the store or killing Hayes while he was working.

At one hearing, numerous psychiatrists who have cared for Hayes testified that he should be released from custody. On September 27, 2007, he was denied release by Judge Steve Balog, despite testimony from numerous psychiatrists as to his mental stability. On May 13, 2010, Balog signed an order for his conditional release. On March 1, 2012, he was released and is currently free.

Hayes got a fuel station job but left it because of bomb and death threats being sent to the shop. No more "notable offenses" have been added to his record after being set free. Karl Knudsen, the attorney of Hayes, has stated: “At some point, the story has to come to an end."
