= S P Jain School of Global Management =

Business school with campuses in Sydney, Singapore and Dubai

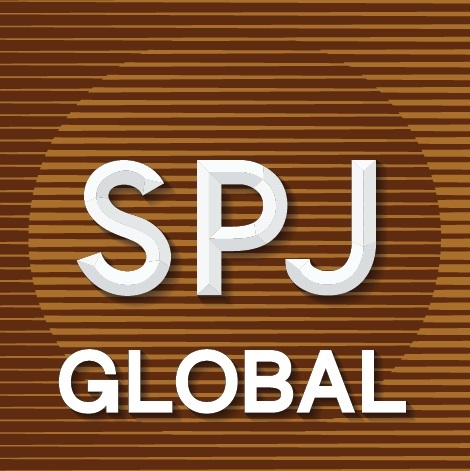
- Motto: To transform lives through the power of education
- Type: Private business school
- Established: 2004
- Accreditation: Tertiary Education Quality and Standards Agency (TEQSA), Australia, Knowledge and Human Development Authority (KHDA), Government of Dubai, UAE, ABEST21, Japan
- President: Nitish Jain
- Dean: Dr. Seetha Raman (Dean, Research); Dr. Gary Stockport (Dean, Executive MBA); Dr. Balakrishna Grandhi (Dean, Postgraduate Programs); Dr. Vaidyanathan Jayaraman (Dean, Undergraduate Programs)
- Campus: Dubai, Singapore, Sydney
- Nicknames: S P Jain, S P Jain Global, SP Jain
- Website: spjain.org spjain.ae spjain.sg

SP Jain School of Global Management (SP Jain Global) is a business school with campuses in Sydney, Singapore and Dubai. Established in 2004, the school offers undergraduate, postgraduate, and doctoral programs.

== Rankings ==
For its flagship Global MBA program, SP Jain Global has been ranked by international publications, such as:

- Bloomberg Businessweek: Top 10 in the Asia Pacific (2023–24, 2024-25
- Forbes: Top 20 in the world (2019–21, 2017–19, 2015–17, 2013–15)
- Times Higher Education – Wall Street Journal: Top 5 in the world (2018)
- The Economist: Top 100 in the world (2015)
- Financial Times: Top 100 in the world (2012, 2011)

== Accreditations ==
- TEQSA, Australia SP Jain Global is registered as an Institute of Higher Education by the Australian Government's national higher education regulator – the Tertiary Education Quality and Standards Agency (TEQSA).
- KHDA, UAE SP Jain Global is permitted by the Knowledge and Human Development Authority (KHDA), Government of Dubai, UAE. The academic qualifications granted by SP Jain Global and certified by KHDA are recognised in the Emirate of Dubai by all public and private entities for all purposes.
- CPE, Singapore SP Jain Global is registered in Singapore as a Private Education Institute (PEI) by the Committee for Private Education (CPE), Singapore. Committee for Private Education is part of SkillsFuture Singapore (SSG).
- ABEST21, Japan SP Jain Global is accredited for its Global MBA program by ABEST21, The Alliance on Business Education and Scholarship for Tomorrow, Japan.
- ACCA: SP Jain is accredited for its Bachelor of Business Administration program by ACCA, Association of Chartered Certified Accountants.

== Campuses ==
SP Jain Global has campuses in Dubai, Singapore and Sydney

=== Singapore Campus ===
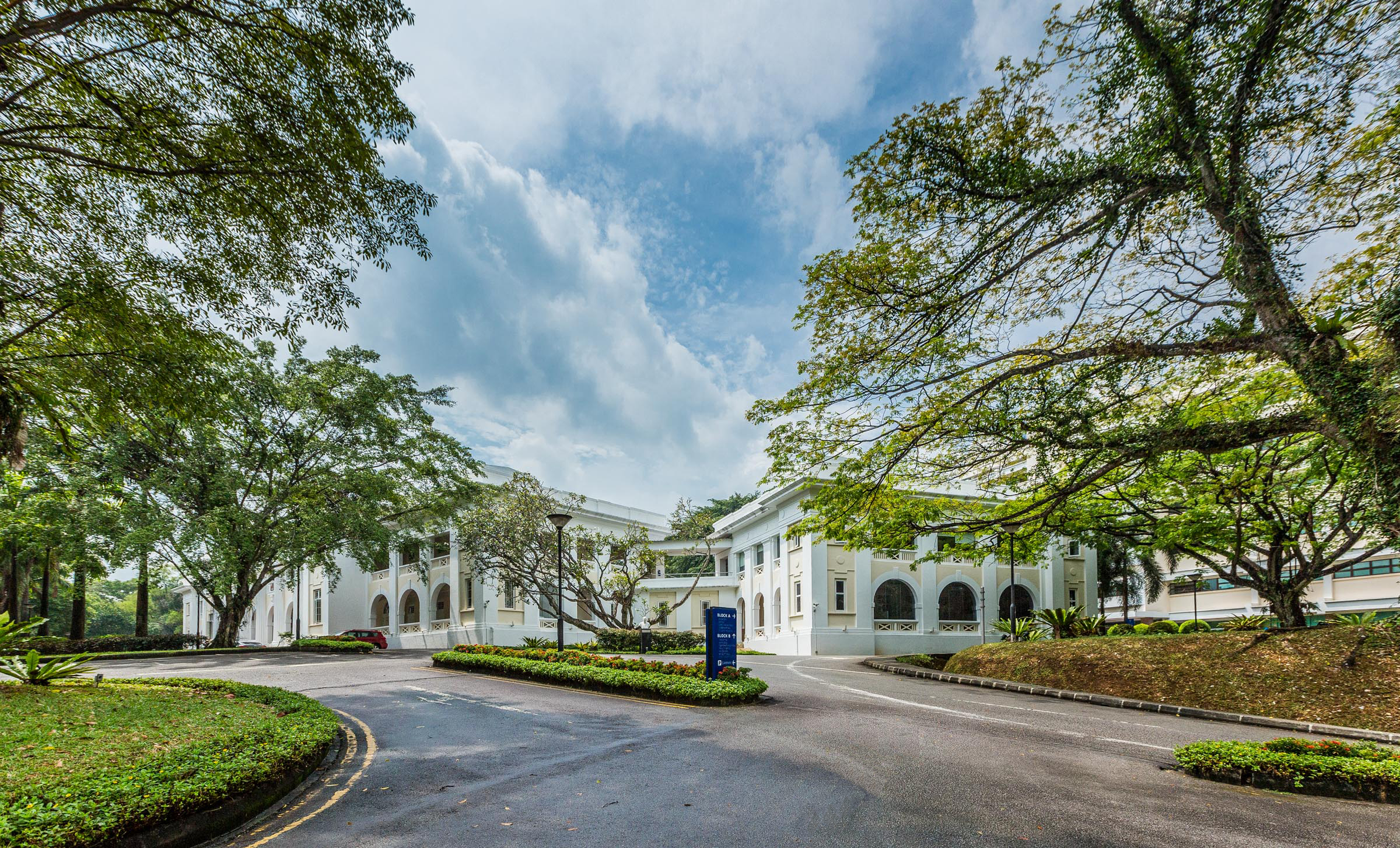
Campus in Singapore.

=== Sydney Campus ===
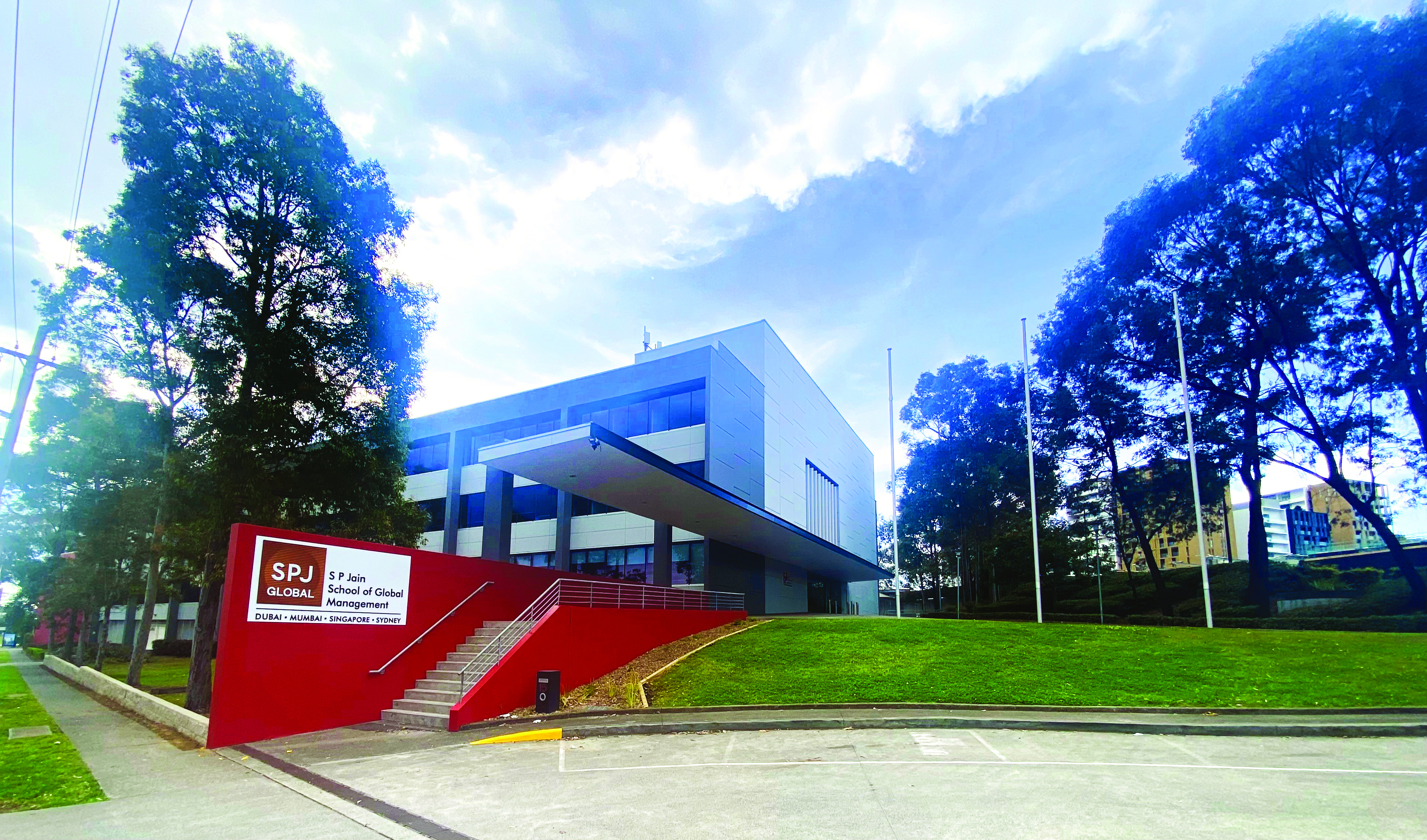
Campus in Sydney

== Programs ==
SP Jain Global offers a range of programs at the undergraduate, postgraduate and doctoral levels.

=== Undergraduate ===
- Undergraduate Certificate of Data Science.
- Bachelor of Business Administration.
- Bachelor of Data Science.

=== Postgraduate ===
- Master of Global Business.
- Master of Artificial Intelligence in Business.
- Global MBA.
- Executive MBA.

=== Doctoral ===
- Doctor of Business Administration.

== Learning model ==
The model is structured so that students begin their studies in one city and then rotate among the other campuses.

In each location, students engage with local businesses through internships and projects, participate in workshops, and attend lectures with professionals from various industries.

== Engaged Learning Online ==
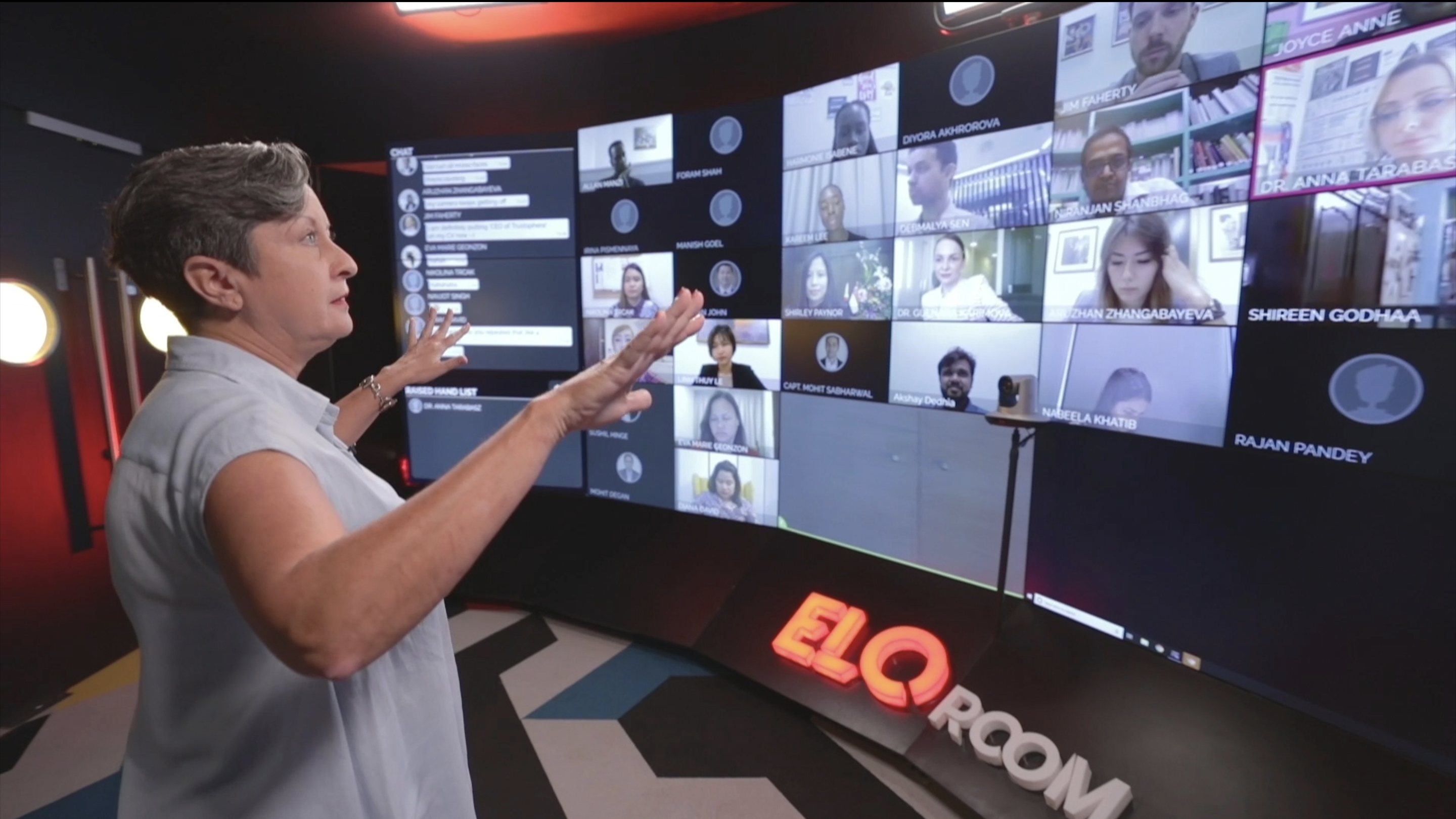

ELO has enabled the school to maintain continuity of learning in disruptive circumstances, such as during the COVID-19 pandemic.

In 2022, the ELO platform won an award in the category of 'Innovative Technology Solutions for Higher Education Provider' at the BW Education's Top Education Brand Awards, organized by BW Business World.

== SP Jain London School of Management ==
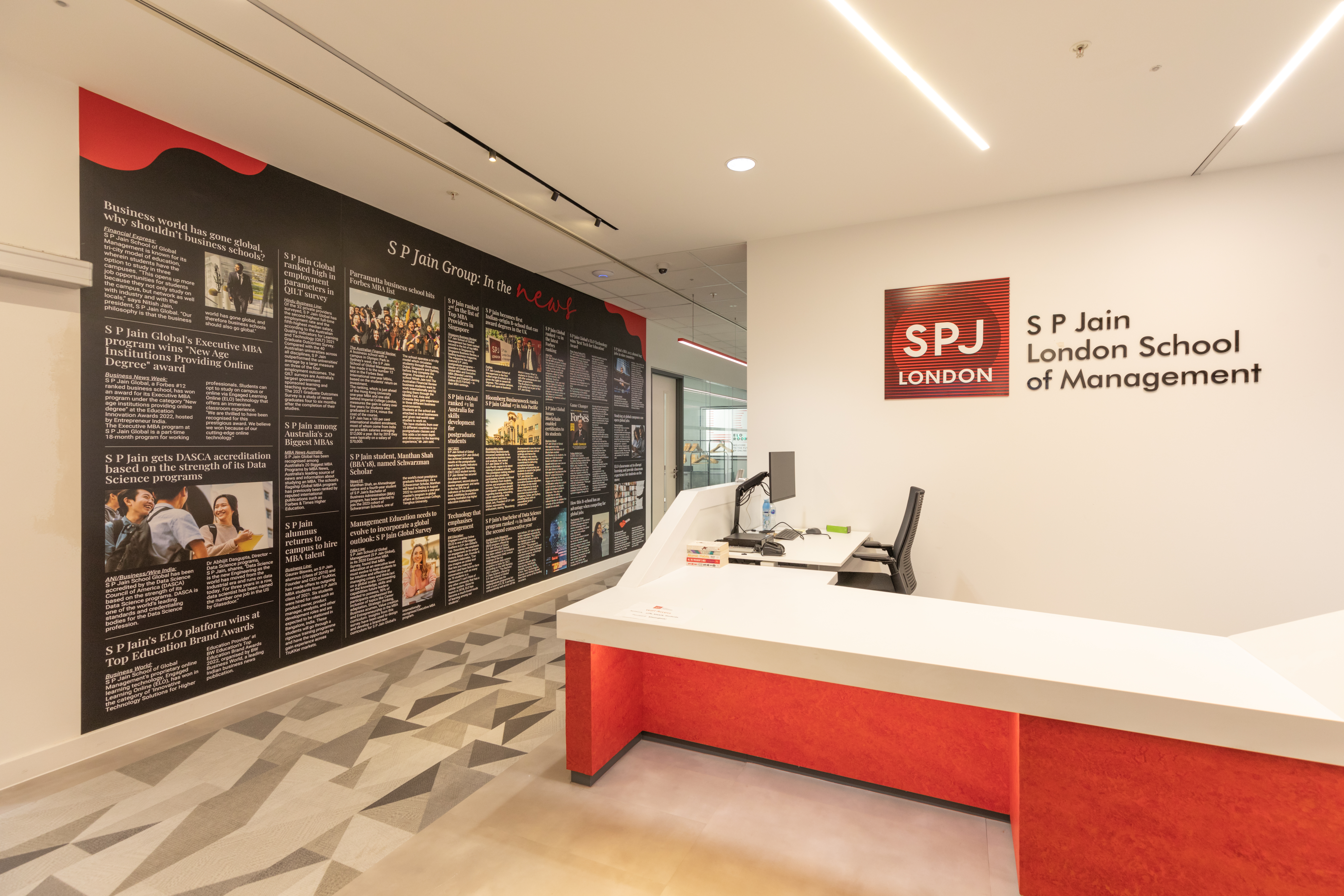
Located in Canary Wharf, a major financial district of London, the SP Jain London campus places students in the heart of global financial and business activities.

SP Jain London School of Management (SP Jain London) is a sister institution to SP Jain Global. It was inaugurated in 2023 by Lord Jo Johnson, former Minister of State for Universities, Science, Research, and Innovation. Located in Canary Wharf

An articulation agreement between SP Jain London and SP Jain Global enables students to study across the campuses of both institutions.
