= Alice M. Hayes =

British horse trainer

Portrait from the 1903 edition of The Horsewoman

Alice Marie Hayes - Born Alice Mary Pyett (1861–9 January 1913) was a British horse trainer. She cohabited with the veterinarian and horse expert Matthew Horace Hayes. Although she took his surname, they never married, as he was already married to Caroline Cardew. The marriage took place on 13 January 1866 in Cannanore, Madras, India. Caroline divorced him for adultery in 1887. Alice was well-traveled and an expert at breaking-in. Hayes demonstrated her riding skills on the most difficult of horses and once, in India, rode a zebra sidesaddle. She wrote The Horsewoman in 1893, a guide to riding for ladies, in which she strongly opposed the adoption of the cross saddle position used traditionally by men. Hayes was a supporter of women lepers in India. She secured additional help for them from the government and donated the proceeds from her book to leper hospitals.

== Biography ==
Hayes was the daughter of William Pyett of Esher, Surrey. She lived with British Army veterinarian and author Captain Horace Hayes, who was 20 years older than she. Horace described Alice as "musical, a clever actress, and born to shine in society".

Riding the zebra

Alice Hayes was a seasoned traveller, accompanying her partner on his many trips across the world. She became skilled at breaking-in horses and, at her partner's demonstrations of horse training techniques, often rode the fiercest of horses that had been rejected as untrainable by tougher men. In Calcutta, India, Hayes rode a mountain zebra that her partner had broken-in. She recalled the animal as being a fierce kicker and sensitive to any touch on his ears. She noted that it was impossible to rein in because "he had a neck like a bull" and, though she admired the zebra's "seal-like" skin, regarded him as "too neck-strong to make a pleasant mount for a lady". She thought that she was the first woman to have ridden a mountain zebra. In 1888 the couple travelled to Singapore, Hong Kong and China.

Hayes wrote The Horsewoman in 1893 which focused on explaining the traditional sidesaddle riding technique to ladies. The work became popular again in the early 21st century as there was a revival of interest in the technique. Hayes acknowledged that the technique had disadvantages when compared to the men's cross saddle position, in that a rider in sidesaddle is less able to exert control over the horse and is in greater danger if the horse rears. However, she still believed that the technique was the only proper one for a woman and that those who supported the cross saddle position for women were "either mad or wholly ignorant" as Hayes considered the position to be "most ungraceful" for ladies. Hayes instructed women at Ward's Riding School in Brompton Road, London. Her approach was to initially focus on posture alone, with an instructor controlling the horse. She had pupils clad in bloomers and tunics, so she could observe their leg positions. This approach allowed the pupil to experience horse jumping as early as their second lesson and was praised in Queen magazine as providing results "in so short a space of time".

Hayes was a supporter of less privileged women. She was particularly concerned with the plight of female lepers in India. She regularly visited leper hospitals and donated to them the royalties from her book. Hayes wrote articles to raise awareness of the condition and her actions led the Indian Government to make additional provisions for women lepers. Matthew Horace Hayes died in 1904. and Hayes died at Wimborne, Dorset, nine years later. In 1906, in Rugby, Warwickshire, she married Enrique Alejandro Rucker (1881-1962), a Chilean national. She died childless, in Wimborne Dorset on 9 January 1913. Probate of her Will was granted to her husband Enrique on 18 February 1913 in London. Ref: https://www.ancestry.co.uk/family-tree/person/tree/3927213/person/-1672413286/facts
