= Albatross Bay =

Bay in Queensland, Australia

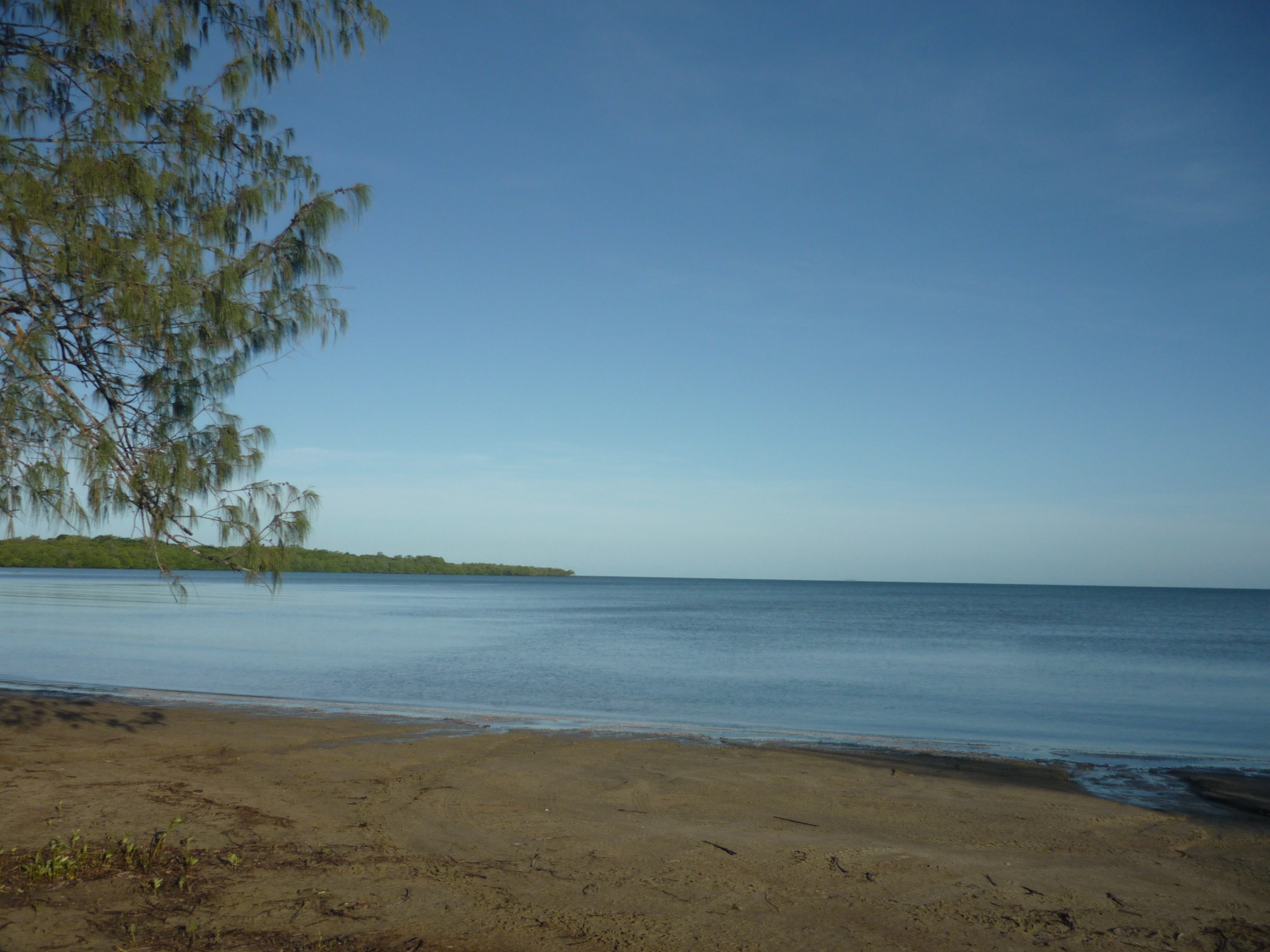
- Looking from Mission River out to Albatross Bay, 2020

- Location within Queensland
- Location: Queensland
- Group: Gulf of Carpentaria
- Coordinates: 12.7156°S 141.6633°E
- Type: bay
- Settlements: Weipa, Mission River

Albatross Bay is a bay on the eastern shores of the Gulf of Carpentaria, Queensland, Australia.

== Geography ==
The bay is offshore from the localities of Mission River (in both Shire of Cook and Aboriginal Shire of Napranum), a number of localities in Weipa Town (Rocky Point, Trunding, Nanum, Evans Landing) and Aurukun (in the Shire of Aurukun).

Three rivers flow into the bay:

- Mission River (12.5867°S 141.9633°E)
- Embley River (12.6639°S 141.8250°E)
- Hey River (12.7367°S 141.8994°E)

== History ==
The bay was named after the Queensland Government's steamer Albatross. The name was chosen either by its master Captain Kerr or by John Douglas when he was the Government Resident at Thursday Island.
