= Weipa Airport, Queensland =

Weipa Airport
- Suburb
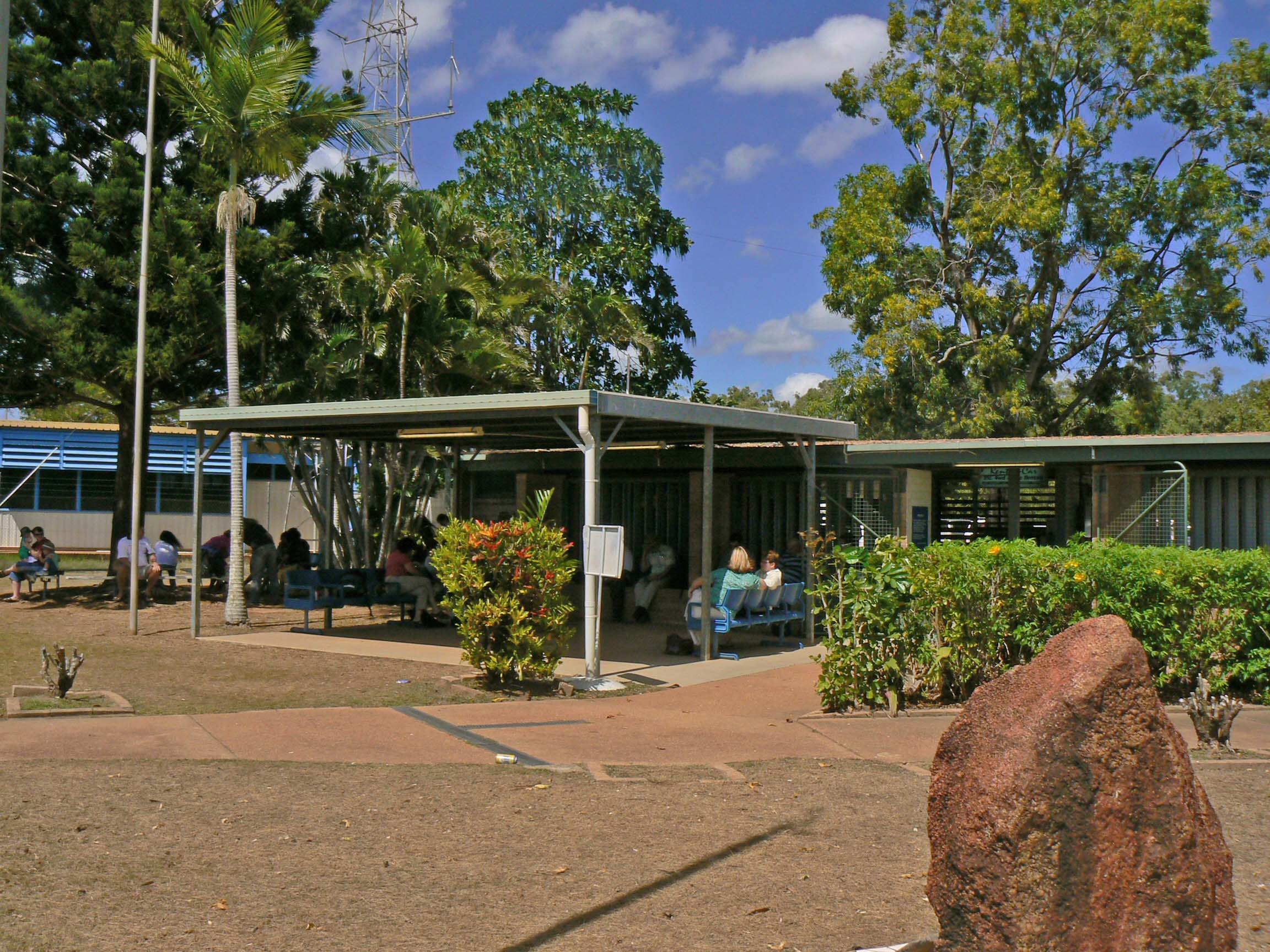
- Weipa airport departure lounge, 2007

- Interactive map of Weipa Airport
- Coordinates: 12.6784°S 141.9247°E
- Country: Australia
- State: Queensland
- LGA: Weipa Town
- Location: 13.9 km (8.6 mi) SSE of Rocky Point; 639 km (397 mi) NW of Cooktown; 803 km (499 mi) NNW of Cairns; 2,487 km (1,545 mi) NNW of Brisbane

Government
  - State electorate: Cook
  - Federal division: Leichhardt

Area
  - Total: 1.2 km^{2} (0.46 sq mi)

Population
  - Total: 0 (2021 census)
  - Density: 0.0/km^{2} (0.0/sq mi)
- Time zone: UTC+10:00 (AEST)
- Postcode: 4874
Suburbs around Weipa Airport
Mission River	Mission River	Mission River
Mission River	Weipa Airport	Mission River
Mission River	Mission River	Mission River

Weipa Airport is a rural locality in Weipa Town, Queensland, Australia. In the 2021 census, Weipa Airport had "no people or a very low population".

== Geography ==
The land is used for the airport runways and associated buildings and not for any other purposes. There remains some undeveloped land. This locality is disconnected from the other localities of Weipa Town and is entirely surrounded by the locality of Mission River in the Shire of Cook.

== History ==
As the name suggests, the locality contains the Weipa Airport.

== Demographics ==
In the 2016 census, Weipa Airport had "no people or a very low population".

In the 2021 census, Weipa Airport had "no people or a very low population".

== Education ==
There are no schools in Weipa Airport. The nearest government primary and secondary school is the Weipa campus of the Western Cape College in Rocky Point to the north-west. There are also non-government schools in Rocky Point and in Napranum in Mission River.
