= Weipa Dispute =

Australian strike and industrial dispute

- Date: 13 October 1995 – 30 November 1995
- Location: Weipa, Queensland, Australia
- Methods: Strike action

Parties
| Unionised Weipa miners, Construction, Forestry and Maritime Employees Union, Australian Council of Trade Unions | Comalco |

The Weipa Dispute was a six-week-long strike and industrial dispute at the Weipa mine in Australia, from 13 October to 30 November 1995.

== Background ==
Comalco, also known as Conzinc Riotinto of Australia (CRA), is a subsidiary of the Anglo-Australian multinational Rio Tinto corporation, one of the largest mining and metals corporations in the world. The Weipa bauxite mine, located in the town of Weipa in Far North Queensland, Australia, is owned by Comalco.

In 1983, the Australian Labor Party won a majority in the Australian federal parliament, allowing it to form a government under Bob Hawke. One of the first acts of the Labor Party government would be to sign the Prices and Incomes Accord with the Australian Council of Trade Unions, in which unions agreed to reduce industrial action and their demands for higher wages, while taking on responsibility for the growth of the Australian economy. In exchange, the Labor Party government promised to increase welfare spending and to implement tax cuts. The Accord, and the Labor Party government, would last until the 1996 Australian federal election.

== History ==
=== Prelude ===
In the early 1990s, Comalco and other companies in Australia began using aggressive union busting techniques, pushing for a move away from workplaces where all workers were covered under collective bargaining and towards workplaces where each worker had to negotiate their contract individually with the company. At the Weipa mine, Comalco pursued a number of techniques to try to achieve de-unionisation, including offering workers an immediate pay raise for switching to a non-union contract and worsening working conditions for unionised workers. Comalco also forced all newly hired workers to sign non-union contracts. Once under non-union contracts, however, the miners would have less control over their schedules, would be subjected to increased monitoring by supervisors, would have any further pay raises left entirely to the company's discretion, and would be barred from seeking third party arbitration to resolve disputes, having to use an internal Comalco process instead.

The introduction of non-union contracts at Weipa proved controversial, with a six-day strike being held in 1993 in protest. Attempts to resolve the dispute via the AIRC in 1994, however, backfired on the unions. By 1995, only 75 of the 440 miners at the Weipa mine still belonged to a union and remained covered under collective bargaining.

The early 1990s also saw disagreements between unions in Australia, including those that represented the 75 miners at Weipa, over how to resolve labour disputes, with the Construction, Forestry and Maritime Employees Union preferring a direct strike action strategy and the Australian Workers' Union preferring a legal strategy via the Australian Industrial Relations Commission (AIRC).

=== Strike ===
On 13 October 1995, the 75 unionised miners voted unanimously to launch strike action. Central to the unionised workers' demands was the concept of equal pay for equal work - that the company should not discriminate against unionised workers.

They would subsequently set up the first picket line in Weipa's history blocking a bridge on the Mission River. The striking miners then set up a further picket line using boats to block the port of Weipa after the company attempted to circumvent the picket line by ferrying non-unionised workers across the river. On 8 November, miners at the Blair Athol coal mine and the Meandu Mine launched a 24-hour strike in support of the Weipa miners.

On 10 November, the AIRC announced that it would allow the company to take common-law action against the striking miners. The company subsequently filed a motion with the Supreme Court of Queensland asking for an injunction against the strike. Comalco also sued 49 of the striking miners, as well as four of the unions involved in the strike, for damages.

On 15 November, the Australian Council of Trade Unions (ACTU) and the Maritime Union of Australia announced that maritime workers across Australia would be launching a five-day sympathy strike to support the Weipa miners. The ACTU also announced that it was planning an additional seven-day sympathy strike involving all miners across the country, aiming to begin on 21 November.

=== Arbitration ===
On 16 November, Australian Prime Minister Paul Keating personally intervened in the dispute to try and convince the unions and Comalco to reach a deal. On 18 November, facing the prospect of a general strike, the ACTU and Comalco agreed to have the dispute submitted to binding AIRC arbitration.

On 21 November, AIRC president Deirdre O'Connor announced the terms of the settlement the AIRC would impose on the two sides. The settlement included an 8% pay rise for the striking miners, back pay from 1 March 1994, as well as Comalco dropping its lawsuit against the miners. In return, the striking miners would be forced to end the strike with immediate effect. In the settlement ruling, the AIRC stated that the Australian industrial relations system was "based upon collective processses as the means of providing terms and conditions of employment." The AIRC further accused Comalco of attempting to "deliberately seeking to eliminate the role of the unions at the workplace through the establishment of individual staff contracts," which the AIRC called "inconsistent with the central role that registered organisations are given under the Industrial Relations Act in the prevention and settlement of industrial disputes. The Commission has a statutory obligation to encourage registered organisations."

On 24 November, five of the miners taking part in the floating picket line were arrested.

On 29 November, the striking miners voted not to fight the imposed settlement and to return to work on 1 December, ending the strike.

== Reactions ==
=== Trade unions ===
Prominent trade unionist Bill Kelty described the Weipa Dispute in November 1995 as "a line in the sand. For us to be beaten is for the union movement to lose its heart, its soul and its purpose." Australian Workers' Union Victorian secretary Bob Smith called for AWU president Bill Ludwig to resign over his handling of the dispute, particularly calling Ludwig's overseas travel during the dispute a "disgraceful act."

=== Industry ===
Queensland Chamber of Mines chief executive Michael Pinnock stated that it was "worrying that the coal industry is being used as a tool in any industrial dispute because it is further affecting Australia's reputation as a reliable supplier in the face of increased overseas competition." Business Council of Australia president Ian Salmon stated that "we're seeing the emergence of a form of militancy which we've been free of for a long time."

=== Politicians ===
Liberal Party leader and Leader of the Opposition John Howard accused Minister for Industrial Relations Laurie Brereton of failing to act to solve the dispute, saying that "on the one hand, Mr. Brereton says that there is no need to change the law, but on the other, he is critical of CRA."

=== Other ===
The Aboriginal Shire of Napranum offered support to the striking miners, with several hundred of its members signing a petition in support of the strikers and the strikers being granted permission to use land in Napranum for picketing. The striking miners also received a letter of support from the Bougainville Freedom Movement, who compared the dispute to the conflict over the Panguna mine in Bougainville, also owned by Rio Tinto.

== Aftermath ==
By the end of 1996, the number of unionised workers at the Weipa mine had doubled. In 1996, the newly elected Liberal Party government of John Howard would introduce the Workplace Relations Act 1996, restricting the power of the AIRC and union activity.

== Analysis ==
=== Contemporary ===
Simon Grose of The Canberra Times described the Weipa mine as "a snapshot taken partway through the process of change which Australia's mining industry has undergone" and the dispute as "a lurch backwards, a blast of anger from the past, but it is less likely to reverse this process than it is to redefine it."

Nicholas Way of the Australian Financial Review stated that Comalco's "long-term strategy has been to have all its workers on individual contracts," a strategy which "evolves from a corporate philosophy of nearly two decades, which says employees work best when their only allegiance is to the company." Way also stated that the strategy's success or not depended on "weaknesses in the trade union movement," saying that "unions, to various degrees, lost touch with members at the very time CRA was training its management to reach out to them. Nowhere is this more apparent than with the AWU."

=== Historical assessments ===
Peter Lewis of the Australian Broadcasting Corporation has described the Weipa Dispute as "fundamental to the development of Australian labour relations," saying that it aimed to ensure "that corporations can't actively discriminate against union members."

Joel Fetter of the Centre for Employment and Labour Relations Law at the University of Melbourne stated that the unions' victory in the Weipa dispute "was to be a hollow victory," saying that "CRA’s industrial relations strategy was radically successful in achieving the deunionisation of its workforce" across all of Australia in the long-run.

== In popular culture ==
Paddy Gorman, then editor of the Construction, Forestry and Maritime Employees Union's journal Common Cause, published a book in 1996 titled Weipa: Where Australian unions drew their 'line in the sand' with CRA about the Dispute.
