= Embley River =

Embley
- Location of Embley River mouth in Queensland
- Etymology: In honour of John Embley

Location
- Country: Australia
- State: Queensland
- Region: Far North Queensland

Physical characteristics
- Source: Embley Range
  - location: Cape York Peninsula
  - elevation: 21 m (69 ft)
- Mouth: Gulf of Carpentaria
  - location: Nanum
  - coordinates: 12°40′15″S 141°50′54″E
  - elevation: 0 m (0 ft)
- Length: 54 km (34 mi)
- Basin size: 4,622 km^{2} (1,785 sq mi)

Basin features
- Tributaries
  - left: Hey River

The Embley River is a river in Far North Queensland, Australia.

The headwaters of the river rise on the coastal plain of the Cape York Peninsula and flow in a north westerly direction eventually discharging at Evans Landing into Albatross Bay near Nanum just south of Weipa and into the Gulf of Carpentaria.

The river has a catchment area of 4,622 square kilometres (1,785 sq mi) of which an area of 392 square kilometres (151 sq mi) is composed of estuarine wetlands. From source to mouth, the Embley River is joined by five tributaries including the Hey River. The Embley River descends 21 metres (69 ft) over its 54-kilometre (34 mi) course.

The river was named in 1895 by John Douglas CBE after the surveyor, John Thomas Embley (1858–1937), while Douglas was Government Resident on Thursday Island.

== See also ==
- List of rivers of Australia § Queensland
