= Napranum, Queensland =

Napranum
- Town
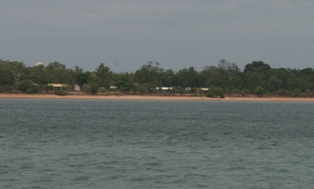
- Napranum seen from Weipa

- Coordinates: 12.6823°S 141.8888°E
- Country: Australia
- State: Queensland
- LGA: Aboriginal Shire of Napranum
- Location: 11.3 km (7.0 mi) S of Weipa; 811 km (504 mi) NW of Cairns; 2,465 km (1,532 mi) NW of Brisbane

Government
  - State electorate: Cook
  - Federal division: Leichhardt

Population
  - Total: 883 (2021 census)
- Time zone: UTC+10:00 (AEST)
- Postcode: 4874

Napranum is a remote town in the locality of Mission River in the Aboriginal Shire of Napranum, Queensland, Australia. In the 2021 census, the town of Napranum had a population of 883.

== Etymology ==
Napranum is a compound word made from two languages of the local area. "Nap" (Trotj language) pronounced "naap", meaning "meeting place" and "pranum" (Thaynakwith language) meaning "meeting of people". In combination, Napranum means "meeting place of the people".

== Geography ==
Napranum is on the western coast of Cape York Peninsula in remote Far North Queensland, adjacent to the town of Weipa and approximately 600 kilometres (370 mi) north west of Cairns, although the distance is 819 kilometres (509 mi) by road.

== History ==
The traditional owners of present-day Napranum are thought to be the Alngith people, although the Anathangayth, Peppan, Thanakwithi, Wathyn and Wik Waya peoples also lived in the area.

Formerly known as Weipa South, Napranum was established in 1898 by Moravian missionaries on behalf of the Presbyterian church. The Protector of Aborigines at the time, Archibald Meston, protested against the establishment of the Weipa Mission on the grounds that the people were healthy and could adequately sustain themselves. Despite this, the mission went ahead inland near York Downs station to avoid contact with luggers, who were notorious for kidnapping Aboriginal people to exploit in their diving operations.

A school was established in 1900 at the mission.

Very restrictive legislation was enacted by the state of Queensland in 1911, giving the Protector exceptional powers. It stated in sections 10 and 17:

The Chief Protector shall be the legal guardian of every Aborigine and half-caste child, notwithstanding that any such child has a parent or other relative living, until such child attains the age of 21 years. ... The Chief Protector may cause any aborigine or half-caste to be kept within the boundaries of any reserve or Aboriginal institution, or be removed from one reserve or institution and kept herein.

It was noted the only other people treated like this were criminals and the insane. The Protector was also given the right to confine (or expel) any such person within any reserve or Aboriginal institution, and the right to imprison any Aborigine or half-caste for 14 days if, in the Protector's judgement, they were guilty of neglect of duty, gross insubordination or wilful preaching of disobedience. It also gave powers to the police to confine Aborigines to reserves to "protect them from corruption". This latter power was used by Comalco in 1957 to justify the removal of Weipa Aboriginal people.

In 1932, the community had to relocate to its present site, at Jessica Point, because of malaria. At this time most of the people were Awngthim but soon different tribes and clans were brought from Old Mapoon (when the people were forcibly removed and the settlement burnt down on 15 November 1963), and other communities.

In 1955, a geologist, Henry Evans (1912–1990), discovered that the red cliffs on the Aboriginal reserve, previously remarked on by the early Dutch explorers and Matthew Flinders, were actually enormous deposits of bauxite (the ore from which aluminium is made) and to a lesser extent, tungsten.

In 1964, the Queensland Education Department provided the teacher for the school instead of the Mission Board. Around this time, it was named Weipa Provisional School. In 1966 it was renamed Weipa South State School, then in 1976, the Jessica Point State School. On 1 January 2002 it became the Napranum Campus of the Western Cape College. The campus closed in 2005 with the students transferred to the Weipa Campus of the college.

The Comalco Act 1957 (Qld) revoked the reserve status, giving the company 5,760 square km (2,270 sq mi) of Aboriginal reserve land on the west coast of the Peninsula and 5,135 square km (1,933 sq mi) on the east coast of Aboriginal-owned (though not reserve) land. Mining commenced in 1960. The mission became a government settlement in 1966 with continued attempts by Comalco to relocate the whole community elsewhere. The company then built a new town for its workers on the other side of the bay.

The Queensland Government took control of the mission in 1966.

Weipa South Post Office opened on 1 December 1967 and closed in 1982.

Napranum eventually received DOGIT status, and has its own community council separate from the Shire of Cook.

== Demographics ==
In the 2006 census, the town of Napranum had a population of 830 people, of whom 778 (93.7%) were Aboriginal.

In the 2016 census, the town of Napranum had a population of 950 people, of whom 907 (95.45%) were Aboriginal.

In the 2021 census, the town of Napranum had a population of 883 people, of whom 716 (81.09%) were Aboriginal.

== Education ==
There are no schools in Napranum. The nearest government primary and secondary school is the Weipa campus of Western Cape College in Rocky Point to the north.

== Amenities ==
A police citizens youth club was opened in 2019 on Napranum Road.

Napranum has the Mary Ann Coconut Library (an Indigenous Knowledge Centre (IKC)) at 320 Wa-Tyne Street, Weipa, operated by the Napranum Aboriginal Shire Council. It is named in honour of a respected elder, and was officially opened as part of the Napranum Civic Centre Opening on 28 October 2015. It was relocated to the Susie Madua Hall and reopened on 11 October 2021.

== Gallery ==
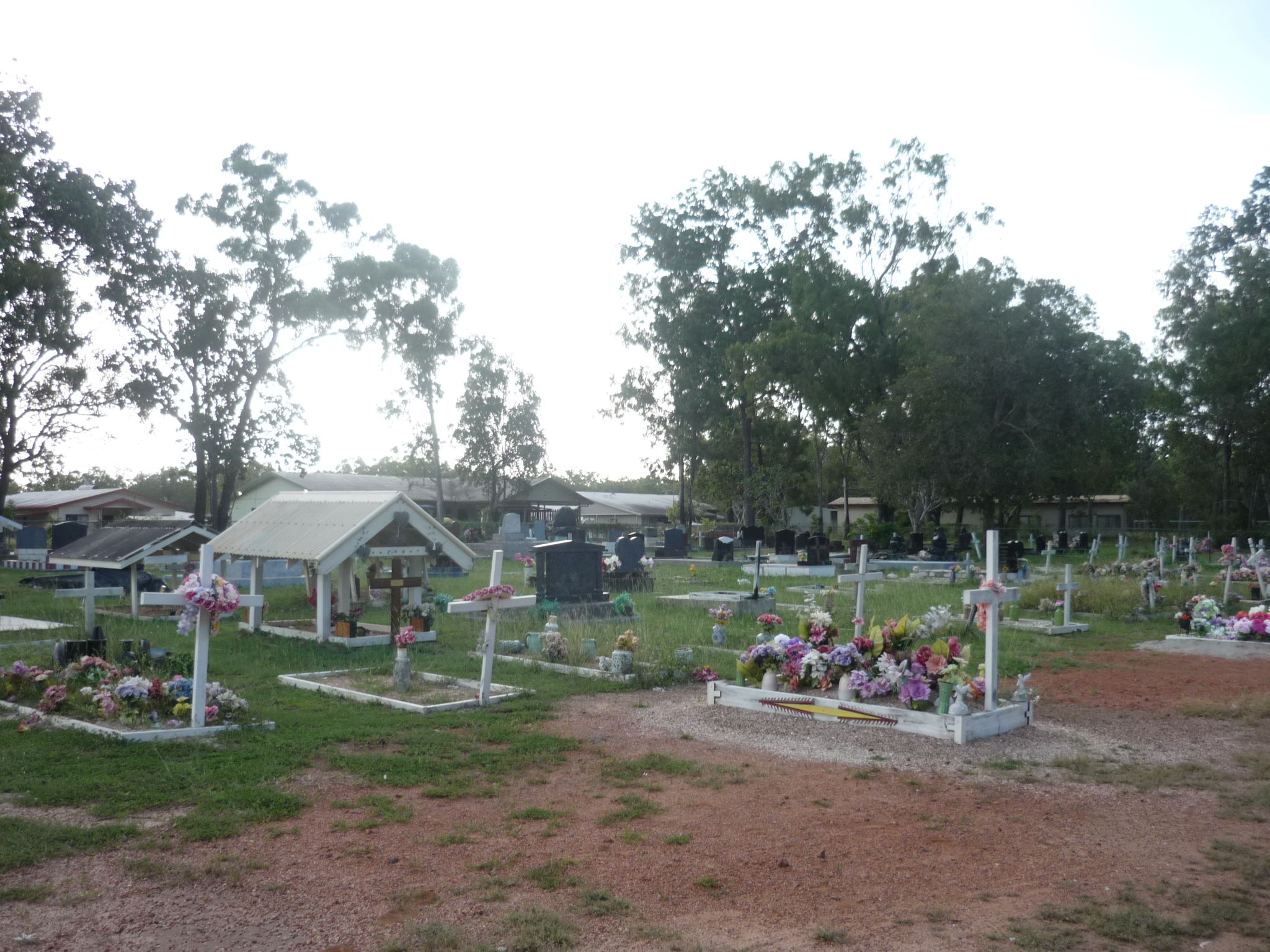
The Napranum community cemetery.

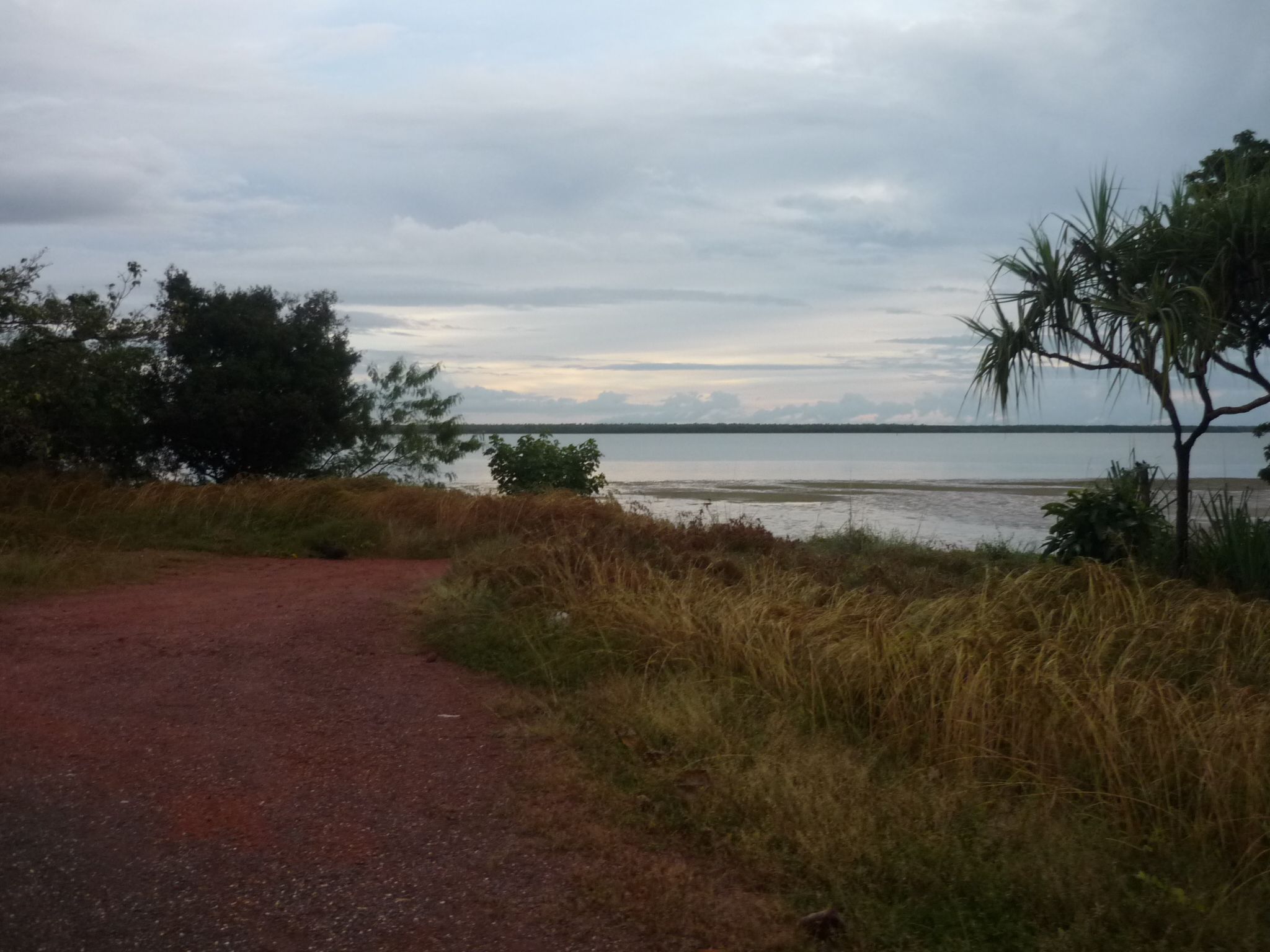
Looking towards the Embley River from the township. Source of fishing and boating.

== See also ==
- Weipa
- State Library of Queensland holds a digitised collection of Napranum newsletters, Napranum Cha, from 1985-1991 that contain local news and social history.
