= Nanum, Queensland =

Nanum
- Suburb
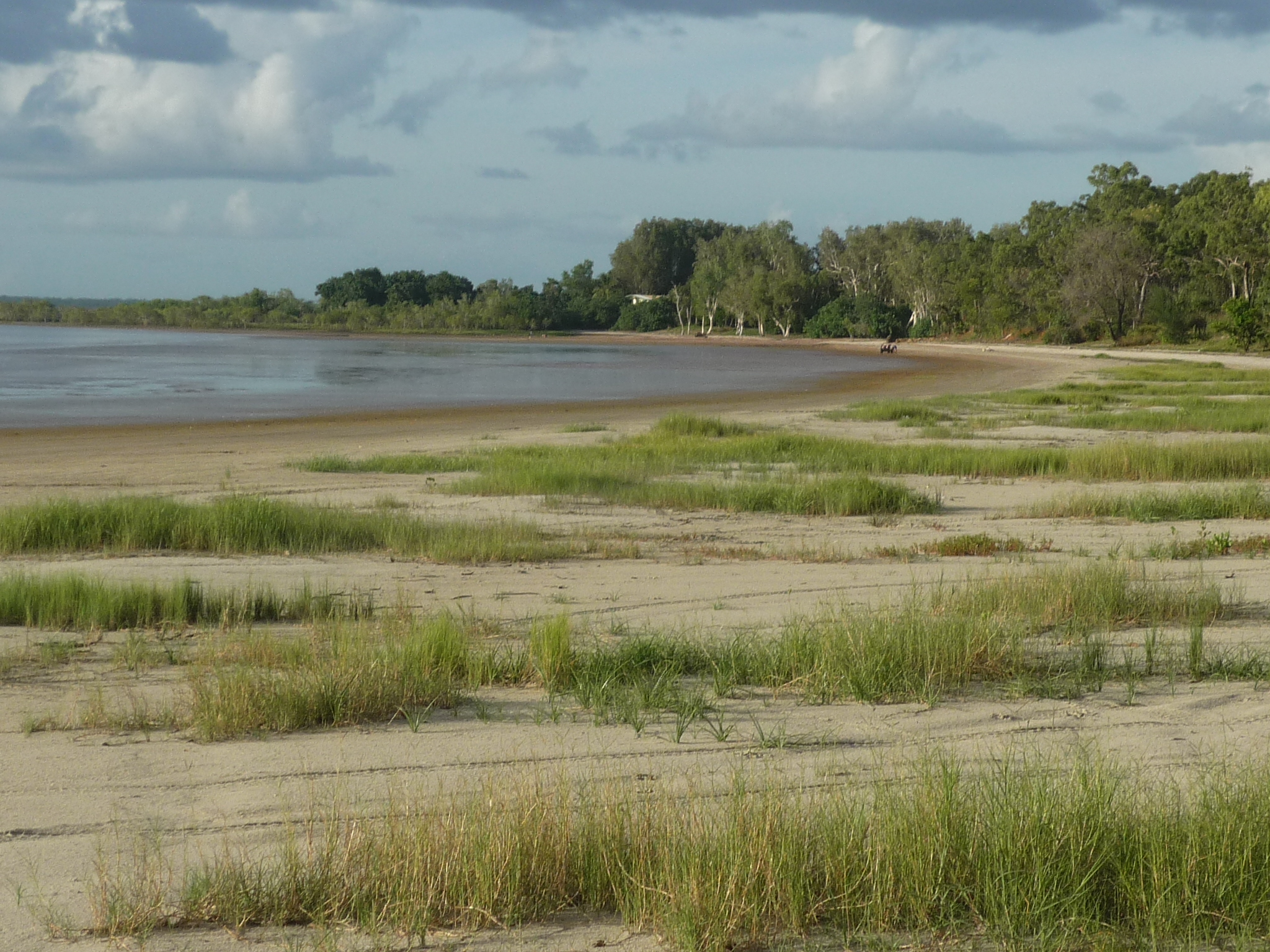
- Nanum beach, 2020

- Interactive map of Nanum
- Coordinates: 12.6440°S 141.8600°E
- Country: Australia
- State: Queensland
- City: Weipa
- LGA: Weipa Town
- Location: 4.6 km (2.9 mi) SW of Rocky Point; 818 km (508 mi) NNW of Cairns; 1,140 km (710 mi) NNW of Townsville; 2,472 km (1,536 mi) NNW of Brisbane

Government
  - State electorate: Cook
  - Federal division: Leichhardt

Area
  - Total: 2.6 km^{2} (1.0 sq mi)

Population
  - Total: 904 (2021 census)
  - Density: 348/km^{2} (901/sq mi)
- Time zone: UTC+10:00 (AEST)
- Postcode: 4874
Suburbs around Nanum
Albatross Bay	Mission River	Trunding
Mission River	Nanum	Trunding
Mission River	Evans Landing	Mission River

Nanum is a coastal residential locality in Weipa Town, Far North Queensland, Australia. In the 2021 census, Nanum had a population of 904 people.

== Geography ==
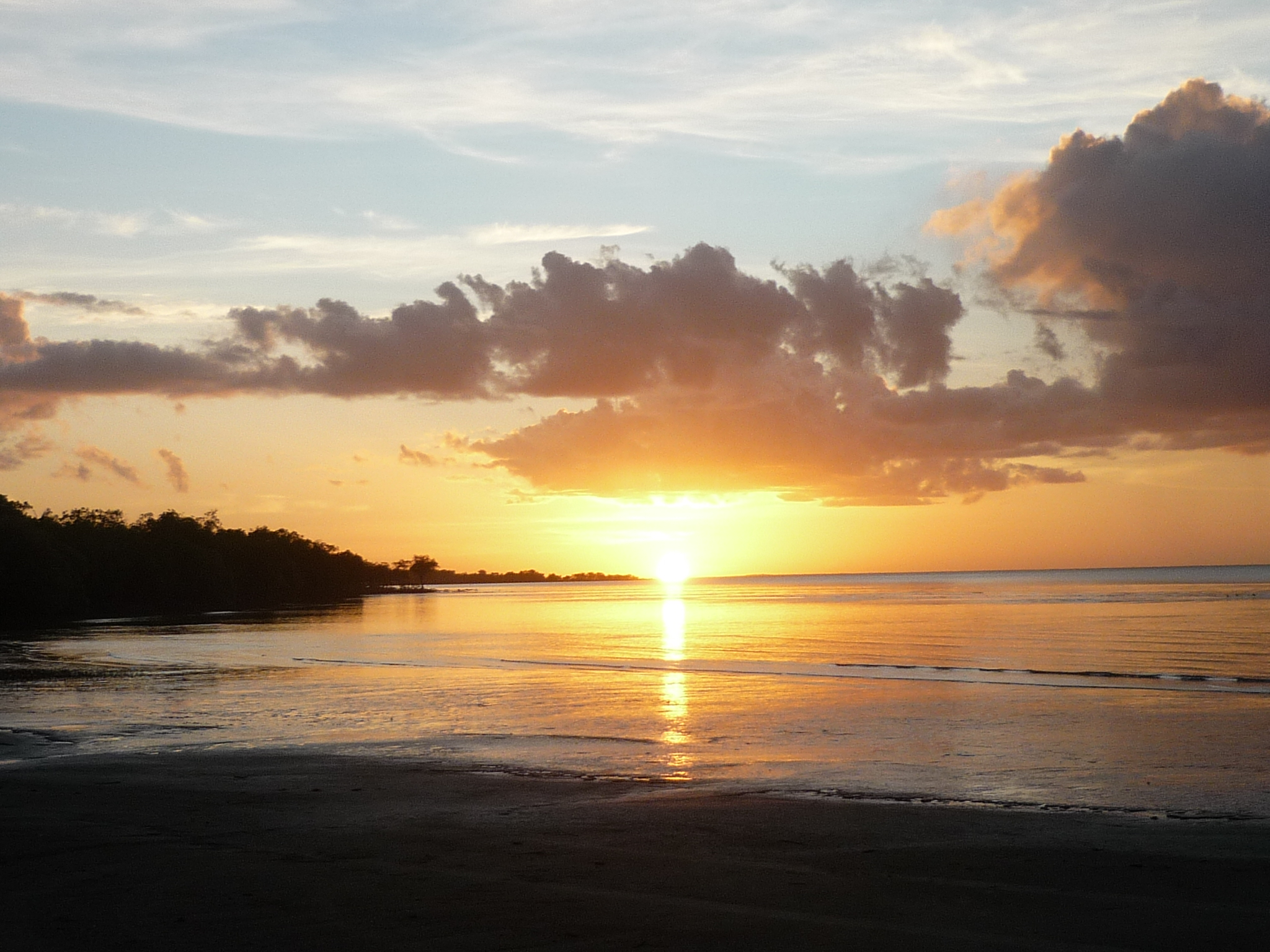
Sunset from Nanum beach towards Albatross Bay, 2020

Nanum is situated between Trunding and Evans Landing, near the mouth of the Mission River. Approximately half of the land is used for residential housing while the remainder is undeveloped.

Albatross Bay is off the coast to the north-west (8.5616°S 95.5783°E), part of the Gulf of Carpentaria. Nanum Beach is a sandy strip (12.6345°S 141.8632°E) that extends along most of the Nanum coastline and north into neighbouring Trunding.

== History ==
Nanum was established in the 1990s as the residential area of Weipa needed to grow southward.

== Demographics ==
In the 2006 census, Nanum had a population of 728 people.

In the 2011 census, Nanum had a population of 815 people.

In the 2016 census, Nanum had a population of 921 people.

In the 2021 census, Nanum had a population of 904 people.

== Education ==
There are no schools in Nannum. The nearest primary and secondary school is Western Cape College in Rocky Point to the north-west.
