= Evans Landing, Queensland =

Evans Landing
- Suburb
- Interactive map of Evans Landing
- Coordinates: 12.6618°S 141.8536°E
- Country: Australia
- State: Queensland
- LGA: Weipa Town
- Location: 6.3 km (3.9 mi) SW of Rocky Point; 644 km (400 mi) NW of Cooktown; 813 km (505 mi) NW of Cairns; 2,485 km (1,544 mi) NNW of Brisbane

Government
  - State electorate: Cook
  - Federal division: Leichhardt

Area
  - Total: 1.0 km^{2} (0.39 sq mi)

Population
  - Total: 56 (2021 census)
  - Density: 56/km^{2} (145/sq mi)
- Time zone: UTC+10:00 (AEST)
- Postcode: 4874
Suburbs around Evans Landing
Mission River	Mission River	Nanum
Mission River	Evans Landing	Mission River
Albatross Bay	Albatross Bay	Albatross Bay

Evans Landing is a rural locality in the Weipa Town, Queensland, Australia. In the 2021 census, Evans Landing had a population of 56 people.

== Geography ==
Albatross Bay bounds the locality to the south (8.5616°S 95.5783°E).

Approximately half of the land at Evans Landing is used for industrial purposes while the remainder is undeveloped.

== History ==
The locality is named after geologist Harry Evans, who found the bauxite deposits in the Weipa area for Consolidated Zinc Corporation.

== Demographics ==
In the 2016 census, Evans Landing had a population of 62 people.

In the 2021 census, Evans Landing had a population of 56 people.

== Education ==
There are no schools in Evans Landing. The nearest government primary and secondary school is Western Cape College (Early Childhood to Year 12) in Rocky Point to the north-east. There is also a Catholic primary school in Rocky Point.

== Facilities ==
Weipa SES Facility is on Kerr Point Drive (12.6635°S 141.8480°E).

== Amenities ==
There is a public boat ramp and pontoon on Landing Drive (12.6642°S 141.8499°E). It is managed by the North Queensland Bulk Ports.

There is a park beside the SES Facility on Kerr Point Drive (12.6637°S 141.8481°E).
