= Weipa Town =

- Local government area
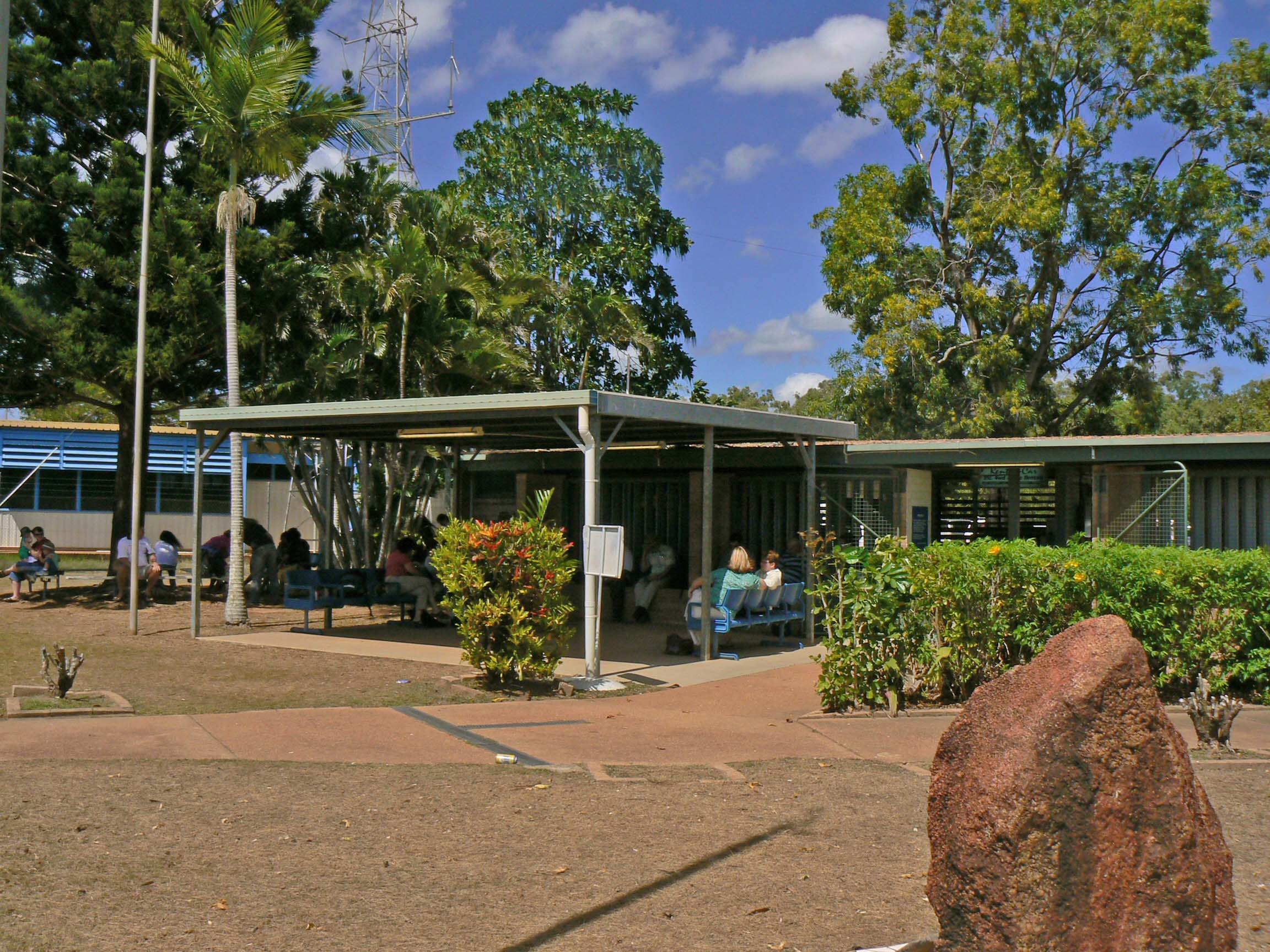
- Departure lounge, Weipa Airport, 2007

- Interactive map of Weipa Town
- Coordinates: 12.6298°S 141.8781°E
- Country: Australia
- State: Queensland
- Region: Far North Queensland
- Established: 1967
- Council seat: Rocky Point

Government
  - Chairman: Michael Rowland
  - State electorate: Cook
  - Federal division: Leichhardt

Area
  - Total: 11 km^{2} (4.2 sq mi)

Population
  - Total: 4,100 (2021 census)
  - Density: 373/km^{2} (970/sq mi)
- Website: Weipa Town
LGAs around Weipa Town
Napranum	Cook	Napranum
Gulf of Carpentaria	Weipa Town	Cook
Napranum	Aurukun	Napranum

Weipa Town is a local government area in Far North Queensland, Australia. It covers the town of Weipa on the western coast of the Cape York Peninsula, including the localities of Rocky Point, Trunding, Nanum, Evans Landing, and Weipa Airport. It is an unusual local government area as it is not governed and managed by a council elected by residents but rather by the company Rio Tinto Aluminium (which operates a bauxite mine in the area) through a governing body called the Weipa Town Authority.

In the 2021 census, Weipa Town had a population of 4,100 people.

== History ==
In 1955, New Zealand geologist Harry Evans discovered bauxite (the raw material used to make aluminium) on the western coast of Cape York Peninsula while he was exploring for oil. Further surveys established it was the largest bauxite deposit in the world.

In November 1957, the Queensland Government approved a £50 million project of the British Australian Consolidated Zinc group to develop a bauxite mine on the Cape York Peninsula to be operated by its newly created subsidiary, Commonwealth Aluminium Corporation Pty. Limited (from 1960 known as Comalco). As part of the agreement, the government passed legislation to enable a town, harbour and treatment works to be established at the company's expense at Kumrunja (Rocky Point) on the south side of the Mission River. Under the Commonwealth Aluminium Corporation Pty. Limited Agreement Act (1957) the area for the town was excised from Shire of Cook and Comalco became the manager of the new town.

In 1964, the first housing was constructed in the new township of Weipa at Rocky Point. In 1967 the Township of Weipa was officially opened by the Queensland Premier Frank Nicklin.

In 1993, Comalco held elections to form a Citizens Advisory Committee to assist in the administration of the town. In 1997 the committee evolved into the present Weipa Town Authority.

== Demographics ==
Weipa Town was included in the Shire of Cook for census purposes until its first census reporting in 2006.

In the 2006 census, the Weipa Town had a population of 2,830 people.

In the 2011 census, the Weipa Town had a population of 3,334 people.

In the 2016 census, the Weipa Town had a population of 3,905 people.

In the 2021 census, the Weipa Town had a population of 4,100 people.

== Towns and localities ==
Unlike most local government areas in Queensland, Weipa Town consists of two disconnected areas. The first covers the town of Weipa (12.6298°S 141.8781°E) with a narrow connecting road to the harbour area (12.6625°S 141.8507°E). The second area (12.6814°S 141.9250°E) covers the Weipa Airport. Having been excised from Shire of Cook, Weipa Town is still surrounded by the Shire. However, the Napranum Aboriginal Shire (formerly known as the town of Weipa South) and Shire of Aurukun (also excised from Shire of Cook) are very close by and, although also split in a number of disconnected areas are effectively neighbouring local government areas.

Weipa is the only town in this local government area. The residential area of Weipa comprises three localities; from north to south, they are Rocky Point, Trunding, and Nanum. The harbour area is within the locality of Evans Landing. The airport area is the locality of Weipa Airport.

== Weipa Town Authority ==
While Rio Tinto (formerly Comalco) remains responsible for the administration of the town, it discharges this obligation through the Weipa Town Authority. The Authority has seven members: four elected by the residents, two appointed by Rio Tinto, and one appointed by the Alngith indigenous people. Weipa Town is a gazetted local government area and the Weipa Town Authority undertakes the duties of a typical local government, such as:

- town planning and community development
- providing infrastructure and services
- making and enforcing local laws
- levying local government rates and charges

Services provided by the authority include road maintenance, water supply, garbage collection, parks, sports ovals, and public swimming pools. The authority provides the Hibberd Library in Hibberd Drive, Rocky Point.

However, the Weipa Town Authority is not a true local government authority as defined in the Local Government Act (2009) because it is part of a corporation. This has implications in relation to loan and budget requirements, Goods and Services Tax on rates, the development of land, and changes to the town boundaries.

Unlike other local governments in Queensland, the Weipa Town Authority has a chairman rather than a mayor. In 2017, the chairman is Michael Rowland.

In 2016, discussions took place in regard to "normalising" Weipa Town into a true local government authority . The three options under discussion were to make Weipa Town a normal local government authority with its present boundaries, to absorb Weipa Town back into the Shire of Cook, or to create a new Western Cape Region centred on Weipa.
