= AUU =

AUU may refer to:

- an abbreviation for Adelaide University Union
- AUU, a codon for the amino acid isoleucine
- Aurukun Airport, IATA airport code "AUU"
