= Aurukun Airport =

- IATA: AUU; ICAO: YAUR

Summary
- Airport type: Public
- Operator: Aurukun Shire Council
- Location: Aurukun, Queensland, Australia
- Elevation AMSL: 29 ft / 9 m
- Coordinates: 13°21′22.8″S 141°43′15.3″E

Map
- Location in Queensland

Runways
Direction	Length		Surface
Direction	m	ft	Surface
16/34	1,260	4,134	Sealed
- Sources: Australian AIP and aerodrome chart

Aurukun Airport (IATA: AUU, ICAO: YAUR) is an airport in Aurukun, Queensland, Australia.

== Airlines and destinations ==
Airlines	Destinations
Skytrans Australia	Cairns, Lockhart River, Weipa

== See also ==
- List of airports in Queensland
