= Totj =

Aboriginal Australian people

The Totj (alternatively Trotj) were an Aboriginal Australian people of far northern Queensland.

== Country ==
Their country spread over some 600 square miles (1,600 km^{2}) of territory from the Upper Mission River and Cox Creek (middle Batavia River). It covered York Downs, and extended south to as far as Merluna.

== Alternative name ==
- ? Kauwala
