= Trunding =

- Suburb
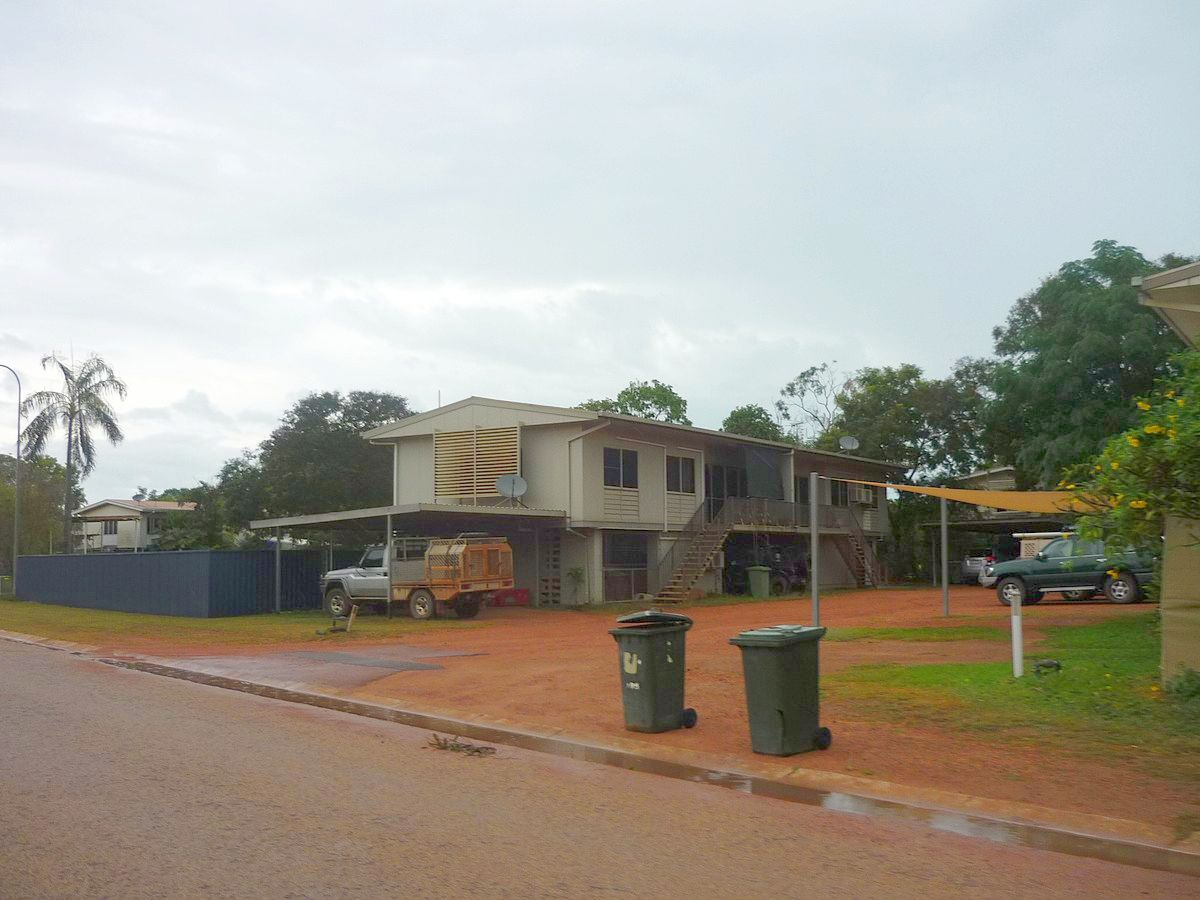
- Typical housing in Trunding

- Interactive map of Trunding
- Coordinates: 12.6330°S 141.8769°E
- Country: Australia
- State: Queensland
- LGA: Weipa Town
- Location: 649 km (403 mi) NW of Cooktown; 818 km (508 mi) NW of Cairns; 1,140 km (710 mi) NW of Townsville; 2,493 km (1,549 mi) NNW of Brisbane

Government
  - State electorate: Cook
  - Federal division: Leichhardt

Area
  - Total: 2.9 km^{2} (1.1 sq mi)

Population
  - Total: 929 (2021 census)
  - Density: 320/km^{2} (830/sq mi)
- Time zone: UTC+10:00 (AEST)
- Postcode: 4874
Suburbs around Trunding
Albatross Bay	Albatross Bay	Rocky Point
Nanum	Trunding	Rocky Point
Nanum	Mission River	Mission River

Trunding is a coastal residential locality in the Weipa Town, Queensland, Australia. In the 2021 census, Trunding had a population of 929 people.

== Geography ==
Albatross Bay is off-shore to the west (12.6206°S 141.8648°E). with Nanum Beach (12.6345°S 141.8632°E) extending from Nanum to Trunding. Albatross Bay is part of the Gulf of Carpentaria.

The land in the north-west of Trunding is used for residential housing while the remainder of the locality is undeveloped.

== History ==
The locality is believed to takes its name from Trunding Creek (possibly originally called Trundling Creek).

== Demographics ==
In the 2016 census, Trunding had a population of 962 people.

In the 2021 census, Trunding had a population of 929 people.

== Education ==
There are no schools in Trunding. The nearest government primary and secondary school is Western Cape College in neighbouring Rocky Point to the north-east.
