= Harry Evans (geologist) =

New Zealand geologist (1912–1990)

Henry James Evans OBE (7 November 1912 – 9 November 1990) was the leading exploration geologist and discoverer of the immense bauxite deposits near Weipa, on the west coast of Cape York Peninsula in northern Queensland, Australia.

Evans was born on 7 November 1912, in Greymouth, a mining centre on the west coast of the South Island of New Zealand. After graduating from high school he studied geology at the Reefton School of Mines. After working evaluating gold dredging areas on the west coast and later for a tin mining company, he joined New Zealand Petroleum as senior geologist in 1938 and spent six years with them before spending most of 1945 assessing the resources of the Greymouth Coal Basin with the New Zealand Geological Survey.

In 1946 he moved to Australia joining the Zinc Corporation (now Rio Tinto) and worked for them looking for oil, gas in Australia, uranium at Rum Jungle, and for potash in the United Kingdom.

In 1955, he was asked to lead a group of American oil explorers to Cape York Peninsula, Sir Maurice Mawby suggested he should also search other minerals such as phosphate or bauxite. Prospects for oil seemed poor, but Evans did collect some samples of the reddish-brown pebbles on their way to the Weipa Mission Station, suspecting they might be contain bauxite. While at Weipa he could see the red cliffs at Hey Point across the Emberly River, but had no boat to reach them.

The samples he had collected proved to be bauxite, creating great interest. Evans returned to Weipa in October, with a dinghy and outboard motor.

He examined 84 km of the coastline to the south of Weipa, noting the huge extent of the bauxite deposits. Evans was unaware at the time that the striking red cliffs along the coast had been remarked on much earlier when the Dutch ship Duyfken under Willem Janszoon charted the shores of the Gulf of Carpentaria, making landfall at the Pennefather River in the Gulf of Carpentaria (the first authenticated European discovery of Australia), and again, in 1802, by Matthew Flinders.

Evans' report led to the formation of the Commonwealth Aluminium Corporation of Australia (Comalco) in December 1956, and the later development of bauxite mining at Weipa, Comalco's alumina refining and aluminium smelting at Gladstone in Queensland, and at Bell Bay in Tasmania and Bluff in New Zealand.

Sadly, the development of bauxite mining near Weipa along the coast of the Gulf of Carpentaria, led to massive dispossession of land, dislocation and great suffering by the Aboriginal inhabitants of the region. The "Comalco Act of 1957" revoked the reserve status, giving the company 5,760 square km (2,270 sq mi) of Aboriginal reserve land on the west coast of the Peninsula and 5,135 square km (1,933 sq mi) on the east coast of Aboriginal-owned (though not reserve) land. Mining commenced in 1960. The mission became a government settlement in 1966 with continued attempts by Comalco to relocate the whole community elsewhere. The company then built a new town for its workers on the other side of the bay.

Evans was seconded to Comalco and was put in charge of exploration work at Weipa. After more work in other parts of Australia, he discovered another important bauxite deposit in the Paragominas region of Brazil. He later returned to Australia and was a director of Consolidated Zinc and Australian Mining and Smelting for some time.

Evans was appointed an Officer of the Order of the British Empire (OBE) in the 1965 Queen's Birthday Honours, for his persistence and skill in exploration. He retired in 1974, but, in 1988 he was awarded the President's Medal from the Australasian Institute of Mining and Metallurgy, for his contribution to early oil and gas exploration in Australia, and for his recognition of the significance of the Weipa bauxite deposits.

Evans died in Melbourne on 9 November 1990, aged 78.
