= Aboriginal Shire of Napranum =

- Local government area
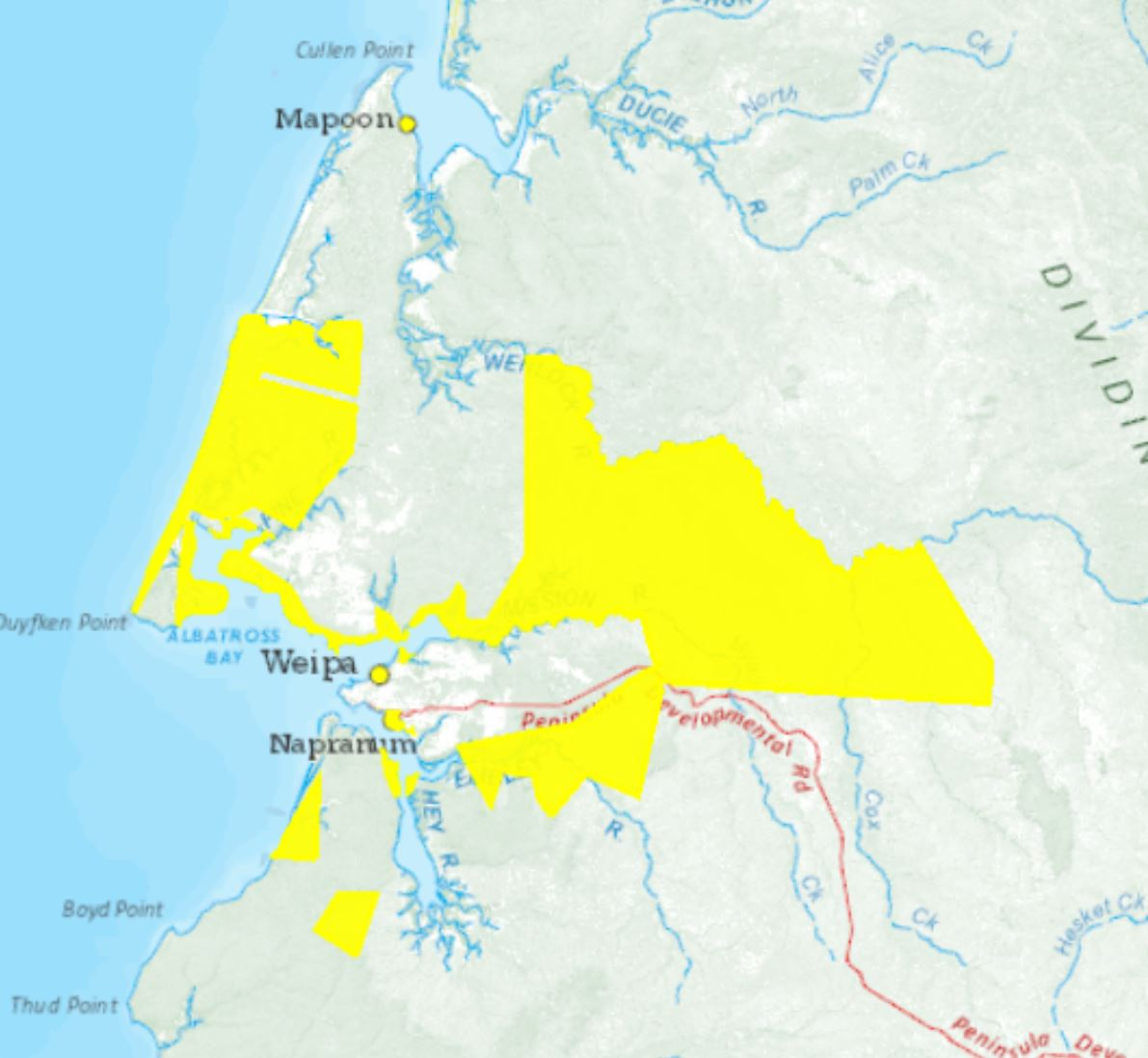
- Disjoint areas of Napranum Aboriginal Shire are shown in yellow, 2017

- Interactive map of Aboriginal Shire of Napranum
- Coordinates: 12.6837°S 141.8879°E
- Country: Australia
- State: Queensland
- Region: Far North Queensland
- Council seat: Napranum

Government
  - Mayor: Janita Motton
  - State electorate: Cook
  - Federal division: Leichhardt

Area
  - Total: 2,004 km^{2} (774 sq mi)

Population
  - Total: 883 (2021 census)
  - Density: 0.4406/km^{2} (1.1412/sq mi)
- Website: Aboriginal Shire of Napranum
LGAs around Aboriginal Shire of Napranum
Gulf of Carpentaria	Mapoon	Cook
Weipa	Napranum	Cook
Gulf of Carpentaria	Aurukun	Cook

The Aboriginal Shire of Napranum is a local government area in Far North Queensland, Australia. It is on the western side of the Cape York Peninsula around Weipa.

In the 2021 census, the Aboriginal Shire of Napranum had a population of 883 people.

== Geography ==
Most local government areas are a single contiguous area (possibly including islands). However, Aboriginal Shires are often defined as a number of disjoint areas each containing an Indigenous community. In the case of the Aboriginal Shire of Napranum, it consists of several disjoint parts of the locality of Mission River (remainder in Shire of Cook) with the town of Napranum as its seat.

== Demographics ==
In the 2016 census, the Aboriginal Shire of Napranum had a population of 957 people.

In the 2021 census, the Aboriginal Shire of Napranum had a population of 883 people.

== Amenities ==
Napranum Shire Council operate an Indigenous Knowledge Centre at Napranum.

== Mayors ==
- 2020–present: Janita Motton

== Election results ==
=== 2024 ===
2024 Queensland local elections: Napranum
Party	Candidate	Votes	%	±%
Independent	Margie Adidi			
Independent	Egito Mairu			
Independent	Rex Burke			
Independent	Tam Wees			
Independent	Ernest Madua Jnr			
Independent	Robert Wigness			
Turnout				
