= Mission River, Queensland =

Mission River
- Suburb
- Interactive map of Mission River
- Coordinates: 12.6627°S 141.9877°E
- Country: Australia
- State: Queensland
- LGAs: Shire of Cook; Aboriginal Shire of Napranum
- Location: 11.8 km (7.3 mi) SE of Weipa; 642 km (399 mi) NW of Cooktown; 811 km (504 mi) NW of Cairns; 2,464 km (1,531 mi) NNW of Brisbane

Government
  - State electorate: Cook
  - Federal division: Leichhardt

Area
  - Total: 5,603.5 km^{2} (2,163.5 sq mi)

Population
  - Total: 974 (2021 census)
  - Density: 0.17382/km^{2} (0.45019/sq mi)
- Time zone: UTC+10:00 (AEST)
- Postcode: 4874
Suburbs around Mission River
Gulf of Carpentaria	Mapoon	Wenlock
Weipa & suburbs	Mission River	Wenlock
Gulf of Carpentaria	Aurukun	Archer River

Mission River is a coastal rural locality split between the Shire of Cook and the Aboriginal Shire of Napranum in Queensland, Australia. In the 2021 census, Mission River had a population of 974 people.

== Geography ==
Within Mission River are the enclaves of Evans Landing, Nanum, Rocky Point, Trunding, and Weipa Airport, all of which are part of Weipa Town.

== History ==
Linngithigh (also known as Winda Winda and Linginiti) is an Australian Aboriginal language spoken by the Linngithigh people. The Linngithigh language region includes landscape within the local government boundaries of the Cook Shire Council: Western Cape York, Winda Winda Creek, Mission River, and Archer River.

Thaynakwith (also known as Awngthim, Tainikuit and Winduwinda) is an Australian Aboriginal language spoken on Western Cape York in the Weipa area taking in Albatross Bay and Mission River. The language region includes areas within the local government boundaries of Weipa Town Council and Cook Shire.

The locality was probably named during 1895 by the Presbyterian missionary J. Nicholas Hey and administrator John Douglas (Government Resident of Thursday Island from 1885 to 1904).

== Demographics ==
In the 2016 census, Mission River had a population of 987 people.

In the 2021 census, Mission River had a population of 974 people.

== Education ==
There are no schools in Mission River. The nearest government primary and secondary school is Western Cape College in Rocky Point in Weipa.
