= Weipa Airport =

Airport in Queensland, Australia

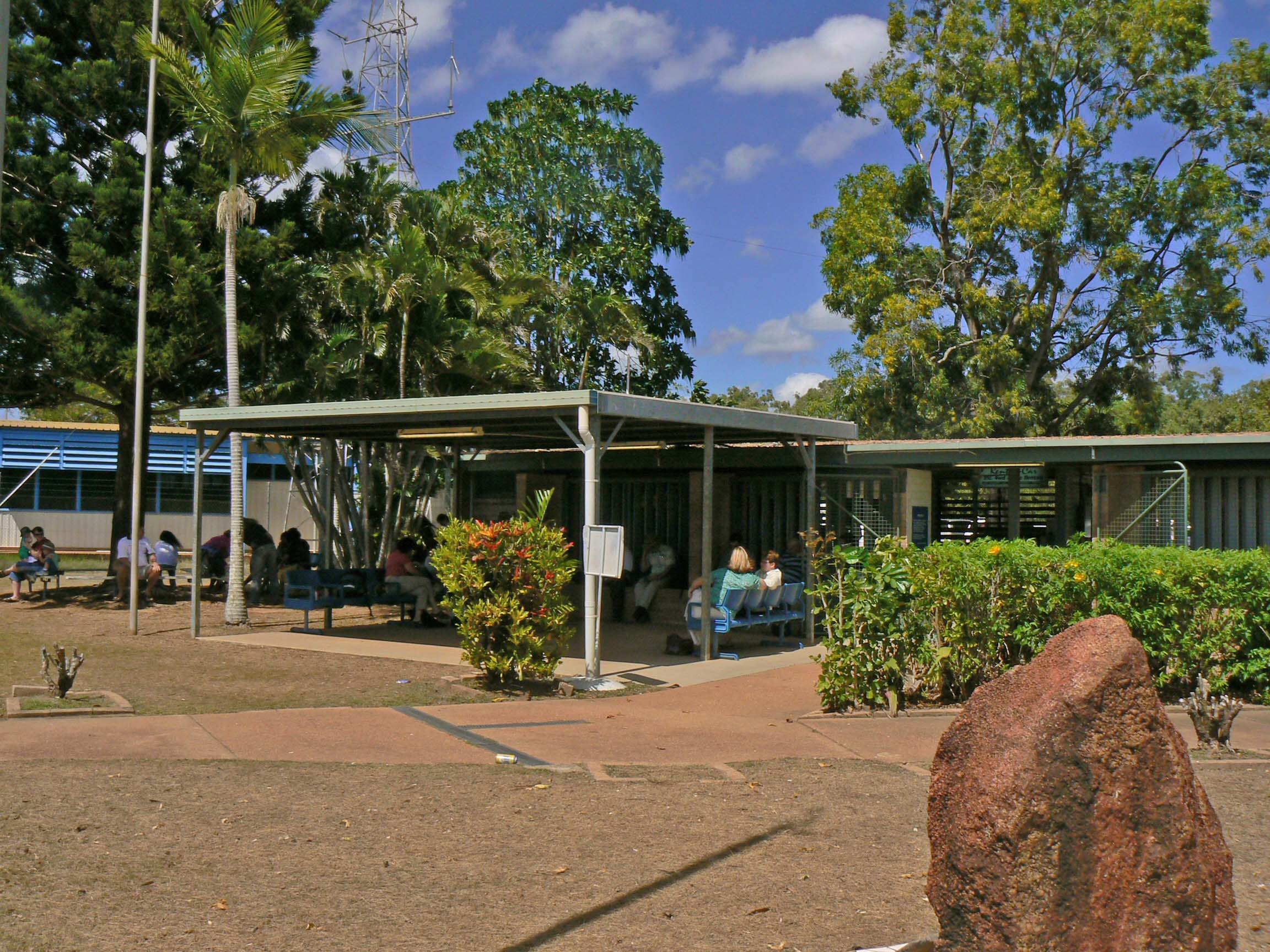
- Weipa airport departure lounge
- IATA: WEI; ICAO: YBWP

Summary
- Airport type: Public
- Operator: Rio Tinto Aluminium Weipa
- Location: Weipa, Queensland
- Elevation AMSL: 63 ft (19 m)
- Coordinates: 12°40′43″S 141°55′31″E

Map
- Location in Queensland

Runways
Direction	Length		Surface
Direction	m	ft	Surface
12/30	1,645	5,397	Asphalt

Statistics (2010–11)
- Passengers: 58,888
- Aircraft movements: 1,144
- Sources: Australian AIP and aerodrome chart BITRE

Weipa Airport (IATA: WEI, ICAO: YBWP) is an airport in Weipa, Queensland, Australia. The airport is 4 nautical miles (7.4 km; 4.6 mi) southeast of the town.

== History ==
In 1972, construction of the Flight Service Unit Lighting Building and Power House began, and it was completed in 1976. Under Aviation Transport Security Act 2004, Weipa Airport was categorised as a Category 4 security controlled airport. Passenger screening was introduced to Weipa Airport in 2014. It followed a 2010 change that required regional airports handling aircraft weighing 20,000kg or more to screen passengers.

== Airlines and destinations ==
Airlines	Destinations
Alliance Airlines	Brisbane, Cairns
QantasLink	Cairns
Skytrans Australia	Aurukun, Cairns, Lockhart River

== Statistics ==
Weipa Airport was ranked 55th in Australia for the number of revenue passengers served in financial year 2010–2011.

Annual passenger and aircraft statistics for Weipa
Year	Revenue passengers	Aircraft movements
2001–02	29,120	835
2002–03	31,427	931
2003–04	38,248	1,101
2004–05	43,482	1,274
2005–06	45,059	1,274
2006–07	47,302	1,514
2007–08	54,476	1,782
2008–09	59,992	1,635
2009–10	54,196	1,212
2010–11	58,888	1,144

== Accidents & incidents ==
- On 27 March 2026, a Bell 206L helicopter's left skid was caught on a tie-down cable, causing it to roll onto its side and hit the ground. The passenger and pilot were able to exit the helicopter uninjured, although the airframe was substantially damaged.

== See also ==
- List of airports in Queensland
