= Shire of Aurukun =

Coordinates: 13°21′30″S 141°43′41″E

- Local government area
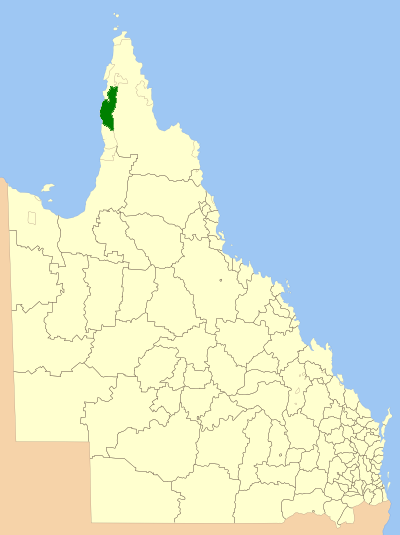
- Location within Queensland

- Interactive map of Shire of Aurukun
- Country: Australia
- State: Queensland
- Region: Far North Queensland
- Established: 1978
- Council seat: Aurukun

Government
  - Mayor: Keri Pauline Tamwoy
  - State electorate: Cook
  - Federal division: Leichhardt

Area
  - Total: 7,424 km^{2} (2,866 sq mi)

Population
  - Total: 1,101 (2021 census)
  - Density: 0.14830/km^{2} (0.38410/sq mi)
- Website: Shire of Aurukun
LGAs around Shire of Aurukun
Cook	Cook	Napranum
Gulf of Carpentaria	Shire of Aurukun	Cook
Gulf of Carpentaria	Pormpuraaw	Cook

The Shire of Aurukun is a local government area in Far North Queensland, Australia. The shire covers part of western Cape York Peninsula, the most northerly section of the Australian mainland.

It covers an area of 7,424 square kilometres (2,866.4 sq mi), and has existed as a local government area since 1978.

In the 2021 census, the Shire of Aurukun had a population of 1,101 people.

== History ==
According to the earliest records, Cape Keerweer, located on the Gulf of Carpentaria coast, was the first site where Europeans wished to settle in Australia. A Dutch ship with Captain Willem Janszoon was the first recorded Dutch landing at Cape Keerweer. Captain Janszoon wanted to build a city at the site but the exploitative action of his crew led to a fight between the local Aboriginal people and the sailors. It resulted in the killing of various crew members and the ship had to leave.

The territory of the Shire of Aurukun was previously an Aboriginal reserve administered under the Queensland Aboriginals Protection and Restriction of the Sale of Opium Act 1897 by the Presbyterian Church. The Aurukun Mission was established in 1904 and Aboriginal people from all over Cape York were relocated there.

In 1978, the land was taken over by the Queensland Government, who enacted the Local Government (Aboriginal Lands) Act 1978, proclaimed the Shire of Aurukun and granted to it Aboriginal Land Lease No. 1. An elected council lasted just one month and an administrator was appointed. The State's media at the time generally was of the opinion that bauxite revenues were a major factor in the Government's decision making on the issue.

In the 1990s, an elected council once again took charge.

== Towns and localities ==
The Shire of Aurukun includes the following settlement:

- Aurukun

== Language ==
Aurukun is known as part of the Wik Nation. The location of Aurukun has the Wik Mungkan Tribe as traditional custodians and is known as a strong First Nations community. It is the last Aboriginal community in Queensland who have a traditional language (Wik Mungkan) as a thriving and strong first language, with more than 1200 fluent speakers from children to elders. Many cultural-based programs, incorporating the five Wik Language Groups have been facilitated from the local Indigenous Knowledge Centre (IKC); This includes the Kaap Thonam: Woyan-Min Biocultural Project App (the Biocultural Project).

In 2022, the Biocultural Project was led by Perry Yunkaporta, Wik Elder and Apelech Clan songman and traditional owner and included Noel Waterman, Aurukun IKC Coordinator and Gabe Waterman, Wik and Kugu Art Centre Manager. Engaging the community, they developed the software application 'Kaap Thonam, a Wik Seasons Calendar', teaching important knowledge of Aurukun's seven seasons. Perry Yunkaporta has been working on the Biocultural Project at the Wik Mungkan IKC in Aurukun for several years, contributing his rich linguistic expertise and cultural knowledge in leading learning on country activities with students from the local school.

== Libraries ==
The Aurukun Shire Council operates the Wik Mungkan Indigenous Knowledge Centre in Aurukun, in partnership with the State Library of Queensland. This was the sixth IKC to open, on 22 November 2002. The council has operated the IKC for 20 years, with periods of closure for various reasons. The IKC currently offers library services, as well as a location for the Aurukun Flexi Learning Centre which focuses on culturally based learning, including Wik language classes.

== Demographics ==
The population of the Shire of Aurukun, along with the Shires of Cook, Torres and Mornington, have been singled out by the Australian Bureau of Statistics (ABS), who conduct the Australian census every five years, as particularly difficult to measure accurately. Reasons for this include cultural and language barriers, transport and geographical spread of the population, who are mostly located in isolated communities. As such, all figures are likely to be lower than the actual population on the census date.

Year	Population
1981	791
1986	937
1991	784
1996	781
2001	1,032
2006	1,043
2016	1,269
2021	1,101

In the 2016 census, the Shire of Aurukun had a population of 1,269 people.

In the 2021 census, the Shire of Aurukun had a population of 1,101 people.

== Chairs and mayors ==
Start of term	End of term	Chairman/Mayor	Notes
2008	2012	Neville James Pootchemunka	
2012	2020	Dereck Walpo	Elected on 16 June 2012 in a postponed election due to the death of one of the original candidates. Re-elected unopposed in 2016.
2020	present	Kerrie Pauline Tamwoy	

== Election results ==
=== 2024 ===
2024 Queensland local elections: Aurukun
Party	Candidate	Votes	%	±%
Independent	Craig Koomeeta (elected)	433	20.54	+2.80
Independent	Leona Nanette Yunkaporta (elected)	424	20.11	+20.11
Independent	Eloise Yunkaporta (elected)	375	17.79	+17.79
Independent	Jayden Marriott (elected)	369	17.50	+17.50
Independent	Kempo Tamwoy	317	15.04	−3.60
Independent	Bobby Adidi	190	9.01	+0.38
Total formal votes		527	93.61	+6.53
Informal votes		36	6.39	−6.53
Turnout		563	60.28	−6.63

=== 2020 ===
2020 Queensland local elections: Aurukun
Party	Candidate	Votes	%	±%
Independent	Kempo Tamwoy (elected)	352	18.64	+18.64
Independent	Craig Koomeeta (elected)	335	17.74	+17.74
Independent	Delys Yunkaporta (elected)	251	13.29	+13.29
Independent	Anna Kerindun (elected)	197	10.43	+10.43
Independent	Noel Waterman	179	9.48	+9.48
Independent	Bobby Adidi	163	8.63	+0.69
Independent	Douglas Ahlers	147	7.79	+7.79
Independent	Stuart Marquardt	134	7.10	−4.11
Independent	Jonah Yunkaporta	130	6.89	+6.89
Turnout			66.91	
