= Mission River (Queensland) =

River in Queensland, Australia

Mission
- Location of Mission River mouth in Queensland

Location
- Country: Australia
- State: Queensland
- Region: Far North Queensland

Physical characteristics
- Source confluence: Myall Creek and an unnamed creek
  - coordinates: 12°34′09″S 142°12′31″E
  - elevation: 21 m (69 ft)
- Mouth: Albatross Bay, Gulf of Carpentaria
  - location: Weipa
  - coordinates: 12°35′14″S 141°57′54″E
  - elevation: 1 m (3 ft 3 in)
- Length: 37 km (23 mi)
- Basin size: 2,697 km^{2} (1,041 sq mi)

The Mission River is a river in Far North Queensland, Australia.

The river is formed by the confluence of Myall Creek and another minor creek. The river flows in a westerly direction an eventually discharges into Albatross Bay near Oxmurra Point and the town of Weipa. The waters then flow into the Gulf of Carpentaria. The river descends 19 metres (62 ft) over its 37-kilometre (23 mi) course.

The river has a catchment area of 2,697 square kilometres (1,041 sq mi) of which an area of 247 square kilometres (95 sq mi) is composed of estuarine wetlands.

== See also ==
- Mission River (locality), Queensland
- List of rivers of Australia § Queensland
