= Weipa =

- Town
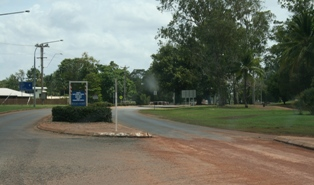
- Weipa

- Coordinates: 12.63°S 141.8786°E
- Country: Australia
- State: Queensland
- LGA: Weipa Town
- Location: 651 km (405 mi) NW of Cooktown; 820 km (510 mi) NW of Cairns; 1,359 km (844 mi) NNE of Mount Isa; 2,492 km (1,548 mi) NNW of Brisbane
- Established: 1961

Government
  - State electorate: Cook
  - Federal division: Leichhardt
- Elevation: 15 m (49 ft)

Population
  - Total: 4,097 (2021 census)
- Time zone: UTC+10:00 (AEST)
- Postcode: 4874
- Mean max temp: 32.8 °C (91.0 °F)
- Mean min temp: 21.9 °C (71.4 °F)
- Annual rainfall: 1,963.9 mm (77.32 in)

Weipa (/wiːpə/) is a coastal mining town in the local government area of Weipa Town in Queensland. It is one of the largest towns on the Cape York Peninsula. It exists because of the enormous bauxite deposits along the coast. The Port of Weipa is mainly involved in exports of bauxite. There are also shipments of live cattle from the port.

In the 2021 census, the town of Weipa had a population of 4,097 people.

== Geography ==
Weipa is on the western coast of the Cape York Peninsula facing the Gulf of Carpentaria.

Weipa is just south of Duyfken Point, which was named by Matthew Flinders on 8 November 1802 after the ship Duyfken commanded by the Dutch explorer Willem Janszoon. Janszoon and his crew were the first known Europeans to sight and land on the Australian mainland.

The town consists of three residential suburbs, Rocky Point, Trunding, and Nanum, in addition to the industrial suburb of Evans Landing; these suburbs are contiguous. The town also includes the suburb of Weipa Airport, which is not connected to the other suburbs and contains the town's airport.

== History ==
=== Traditional owners and languages ===
Yupanguthi (Yuputhimri, Jupangati, Yupangathi, Nggerikudi, Yupungati, Jupangati) is an Australian Aboriginal language spoken on Yupanguthi country. The Yupanguthi language region includes the landscape within the local government boundaries of the landscape within the local government boundaries of the Shire of Cook and Weipa Region.

Kugu Yi'anh is a language of Cape York. The traditional language area of Kugu Yi'anh includes landscape within the local government boundaries of the Cook Shire.

Kugu Nganchara (also known as Wik, Wiknantjara, Wik Nganychara, Wik Ngencherr. See also related Wik languages) is a traditional language of the area that includes the landscape within the local government boundaries of the Cook Shire.

Kugu Muminh (also known as Kuku-Muminh. See also related Wik languages) is one of the traditional languages that includes the landscape within the local government boundaries of the Cook Shire.

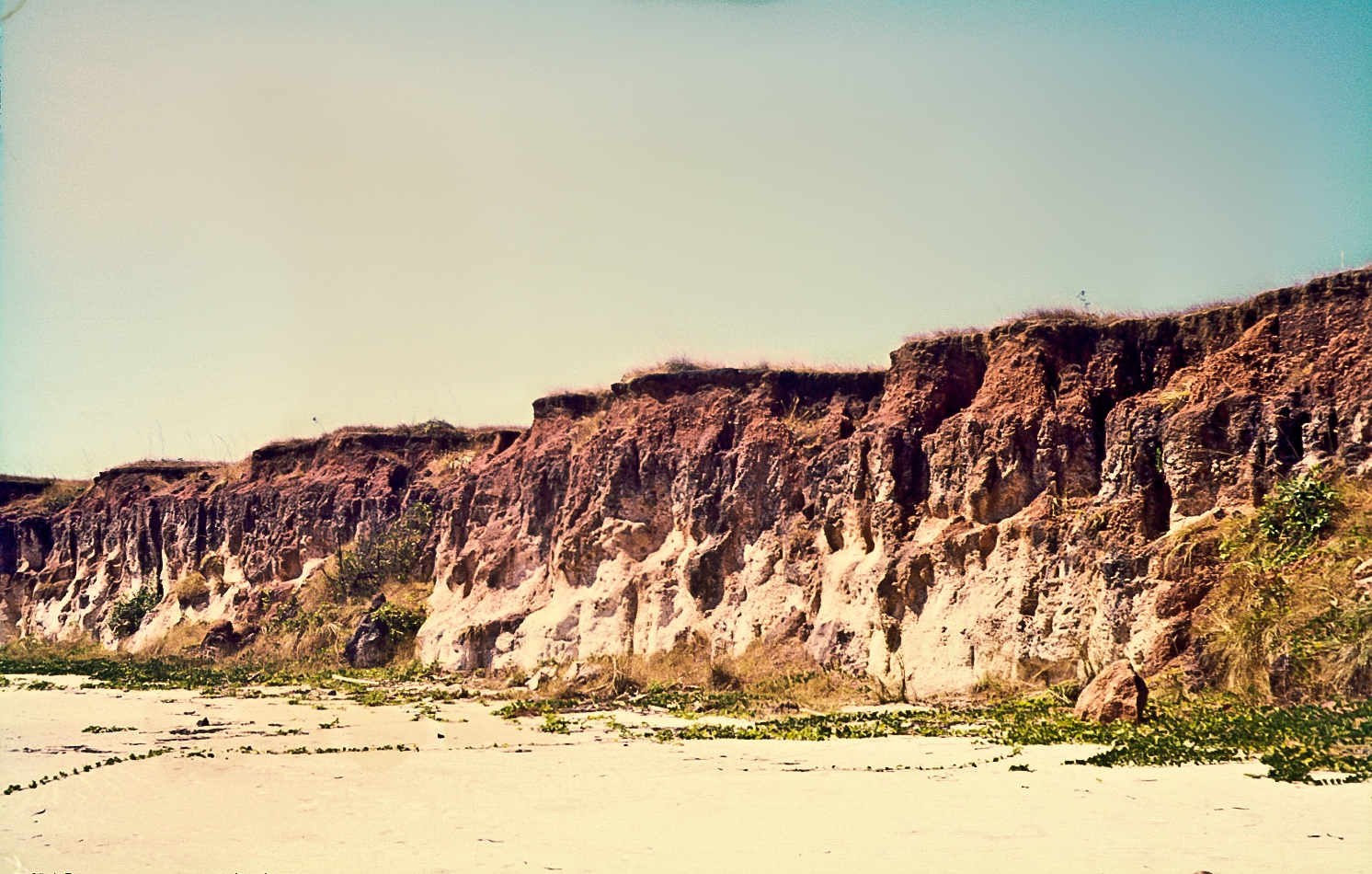
Bauxite section on kaolinitic sandstone, 1969

Thaynakwith (also known as Awngthim, Tainikuit and Winduwinda) is an Australian Aboriginal language spoken on Western Cape York in the Weipa area taking in Albatross Bay and Mission River. The language region includes areas within the local government boundaries of Weipa Town Council and Cook Shire.

=== Weipa Mission ===
In 1895, Presbyterian missionary Reverend Nicholas John Hey established a mission at the junction of Embley River and Spring Creek, which he called Weipa, which is believed to derive from the Anhathangayth word meaning "fighting ground". In 1932 the mission relocated approximately 28 kilometres (17 mi) to Jessica Point, continuing under the same name, Weipa Mission.

Very restrictive legislation was enacted by the state of Queensland in 1911, making the Protector of Aborigines the legal guardian of every Aboriginal and part-Aboriginal child (until he/she was 21), and the right to confine (or expel) any such person within any Aboriginal reserve or institution, and the right to imprison any Aboriginal or part-Aboriginal person for 14 days if, in the Protector's judgement, they were guilty of neglect of duty, gross insubordination or wilful preaching of disobedience. It also gave powers to the police to confine Aboriginal people to reserves to "protect them from corruption". This latter power was given by Comalco in 1957 to justify the removal of Weipa Aboriginal people.

In 1932, the community had to relocate to its present site, at Jessica Point now called Napranum because of malaria. It is about 12 kilometres (7.5 mi) south of the present town of Weipa. At this time most of the people were Awngthim but soon different tribes and clans and other communities were forcibly removed from Old Mapoon. To prevent the spread of malaria, the Old Mapoon settlement was burnt down on 15 November 1963.

=== Mining town ===
In 1955 a geologist, Henry Evans (1912–1990), discovered that the red cliffs on the Aboriginal reserve, previously remarked on by the early Dutch explorers and Matthew Flinders, were actually enormous deposits of bauxite – the ore from which aluminium is made – and to a lesser extent tungsten.

The "Comalco Act 1957" revoked the reserve status, giving the company 5,760 square kilometres (2,220 sq mi) of Aboriginal reserve land on the west coast of the Peninsula and 5,135 square kilometres (1,983 sq mi) on the east coast of Aboriginal-owned (though not reserve) land. Mining commenced in 1960. In 1962, residents accepted Comalco's offer to rebuild the Jessica Point village at a cost of £150,000. By the time building began in 1965, it became clear that funding was inadequate to build houses for the whole community, which contributed towards the Presbyterian Church's decision to hand over responsibility for the mission to the Queensland Government. The community became known as Weipa South after this.

The Weipa Parish of the Roman Catholic Diocese of Cairns was established in 1982.

On 30 March 1985, the Weipa South community elected the Weipa South Aboriginal Council, and the Aboriginal reserve held by the government was transferred to the council on 27 October 1988 under a Deed of Grant in Trust (DOGIT). In 1990, the Weipa South community became known as Napranum, meaning "meeting place of the people". The DOGIT lands became known as the Napranum DOGIT in 1991. In 1992, the Peppan people, originally located to the east of Napranum, were granted freehold title to former Aboriginal reserve land, which had been leased to the Commonwealth for the construction of Scherger Air Force Base. This was the first real compensation to the people of Napranum for use of their land.

In 1995 a major industrial dispute occurred between Comalco and its workforce to maintain union coverage, pay and conditions.

On 1 January 2005, the Napranum Aboriginal Council became the Napranum Aboriginal Shire Council.

St Joseph's Parish School opened in 2016 with the school offering enrolment in years P–3 with a composite 4–6 class but expanded to be able to offer classes for each primary levels (P–6).

== Demographics ==
In the 2016 census, the town of Weipa had a population of 3,899 people.

In the 2021 census, the town of Weipa had a population of 4,097 people.

== Climate ==
Weipa has a tropical savanna climate (Köppen: Aw), with three distinct seasons, which vary in their intensity and duration. The wet season, which runs from January to April, is characterised by high humidity, warm nights and heavy downpours, as well as occasional monsoonal lows and tropical cyclones. The dry season, running from May to September, features hot and dry days, cooler nights and little rainfall. The build-up season, running from October to December, is oppressively hot and humid, with frequent days over 35.0 °C (95.0 °F), with infrequent, heavy downpours associated with severe thunderstorms.

Temperatures remain hot year-round, with average maxima ranging from 31.1 °C (88.0 °F) in July to 35.9 °C (96.6 °F) in November. Average annual rainfall is 1,968.5 mm (77.50 in), and the highest daily rainfall recorded was 356.0 millimetres (14.02 in) during the passage of Tropical Cyclone Oswald on 23 January 2013. Extreme temperatures have ranged from 9.6 °C (49.3 °F) on 3 August 1990 to 40.1 °C (104.2 °F) on 29 October 2022.

While most climate data was taken from Weipa Airport, extreme temperatures were combined from the older Eastern Ave and newer Airport weather stations (1959–2024).

Climate data for Weipa (12º37'48"S, 141º52'48"E, 20 m AMSL) (1990–2024 normals, extremes 1959–present)
Month	Jan	Feb	Mar	Apr	May	Jun	Jul	Aug	Sep	Oct	Nov	Dec	Year
Record high °C (°F)	37.5 (99.5)	35.7 (96.3)	35.7 (96.3)	35.3 (95.5)	35.5 (95.9)	35.5 (95.9)	35.7 (96.3)	35.9 (96.6)	38.6 (101.5)	40.1 (104.2)	39.6 (103.3)	39.2 (102.6)	40.1 (104.2)
Mean maximum °C (°F)	35.1 (95.2)	34.1 (93.4)	34.1 (93.4)	33.9 (93.0)	33.4 (92.1)	33.0 (91.4)	33.1 (91.6)	34.5 (94.1)	36.9 (98.4)	38.1 (100.6)	38.2 (100.8)	37.0 (98.6)	38.6 (101.5)
Mean daily maximum °C (°F)	32.0 (89.6)	31.5 (88.7)	31.9 (89.4)	32.3 (90.1)	31.9 (89.4)	31.2 (88.2)	31.1 (88.0)	32.2 (90.0)	34.5 (94.1)	35.8 (96.4)	35.9 (96.6)	34.0 (93.2)	32.9 (91.1)
Daily mean °C (°F)	28.2 (82.8)	27.9 (82.2)	28.0 (82.4)	27.7 (81.9)	26.7 (80.1)	25.7 (78.3)	25.1 (77.2)	25.6 (78.1)	27.3 (81.1)	28.9 (84.0)	29.7 (85.5)	29.2 (84.6)	27.5 (81.5)
Mean daily minimum °C (°F)	24.3 (75.7)	24.3 (75.7)	24.0 (75.2)	23.0 (73.4)	21.5 (70.7)	20.1 (68.2)	19.1 (66.4)	18.9 (66.0)	20.0 (68.0)	21.9 (71.4)	23.5 (74.3)	24.3 (75.7)	22.1 (71.7)
Mean minimum °C (°F)	22.5 (72.5)	22.6 (72.7)	22.1 (71.8)	20.5 (68.9)	18.4 (65.1)	16.2 (61.2)	15.1 (59.2)	15.3 (59.5)	16.8 (62.2)	19.0 (66.2)	20.9 (69.6)	22.4 (72.3)	14.1 (57.4)
Record low °C (°F)	20.0 (68.0)	20.1 (68.2)	19.1 (66.4)	14.4 (57.9)	12.7 (54.9)	10.2 (50.4)	9.9 (49.8)	9.6 (49.3)	13.9 (57.0)	13.2 (55.8)	17.8 (64.0)	20.1 (68.2)	9.6 (49.3)
Average precipitation mm (inches)	500.8 (19.72)	501.4 (19.74)	404.0 (15.91)	111.4 (4.39)	19.8 (0.78)	3.3 (0.13)	1.6 (0.06)	4.5 (0.18)	1.8 (0.07)	20.0 (0.79)	92.4 (3.64)	291.6 (11.48)	1,968.5 (77.50)
Average precipitation days (≥ 1.0 mm)	16.1	15.6	14.8	7.3	1.9	0.4	0.4	0.5	0.4	1.4	4.9	11.5	75.2
Average afternoon relative humidity (%)	73	76	70	59	52	49	44	41	37	39	46	60	54
Average dew point °C (°F)	24.0 (75.2)	24.3 (75.7)	23.4 (74.1)	21.5 (70.7)	19.4 (66.9)	17.8 (64.0)	15.9 (60.6)	15.2 (59.4)	15.5 (59.9)	17.0 (62.6)	19.3 (66.7)	22.4 (72.3)	19.6 (67.3)
Mean monthly sunshine hours	164.3	144.1	186.0	234.0	254.2	237.0	254.2	275.9	285.0	303.8	285.0	232.5	2,856
Percentage possible sunshine	41	41	49	66	71	69	72	76	79	79	75	58	65
Source: Bureau of Meteorology

== Economy ==
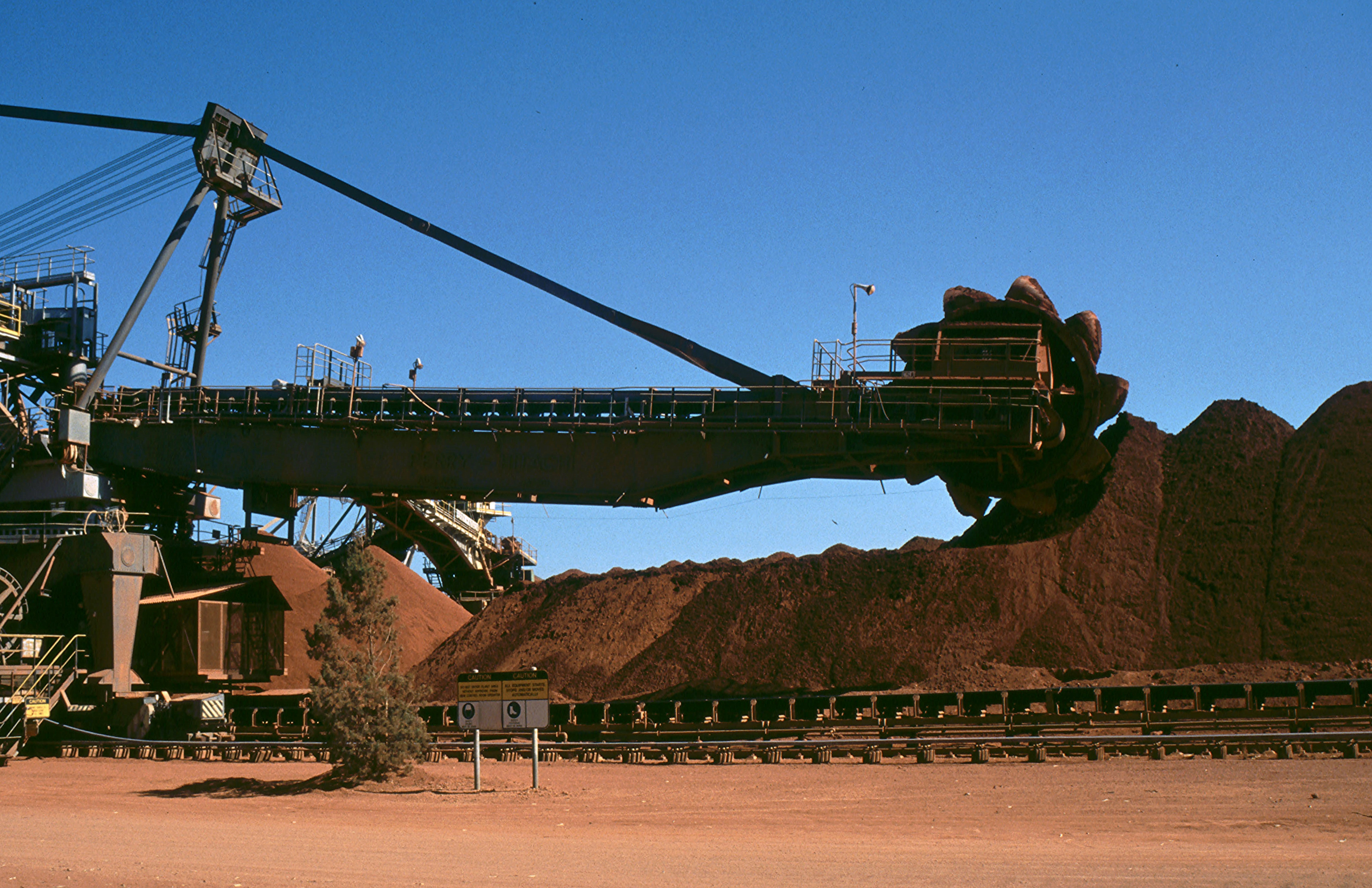
Mining equipment at the Comalco (now Rio Tinto Aluminium) bauxite mine; Weipa, 1995

The present town was constructed mainly by Comalco (now called Rio Tinto), a large aluminium company, which began making trial shipments of bauxite to Japan in 1962. A railway was constructed to transport the ore from the mine at Andoom to the export facility at Lorim Point. Weipa bauxite mine is among the world's largest. Using figures from 2006, Reuters reported that it ranked third in the world, with capacity and production at 15.5 and 16.1 million tonnes respectively.

== Education ==
There are two schools in Weipa.

The Western Cape College is a government co-educational school; it provides early childhood (kindergarten), primary and secondary schooling. It is on the corner of Central and Eastern Avenues in Rocky Point (12.6269°S 141.8805°E). In 2015, the school had an enrolment of 1,073 students with 93 teachers (90 full-time equivalent).

St Joseph's Parish School is a Roman Catholic co-educational primary school (Prep–6) at 2 Boundary Road, Rocky Point (12.6293°S 141.8802°E).

== Amenities ==
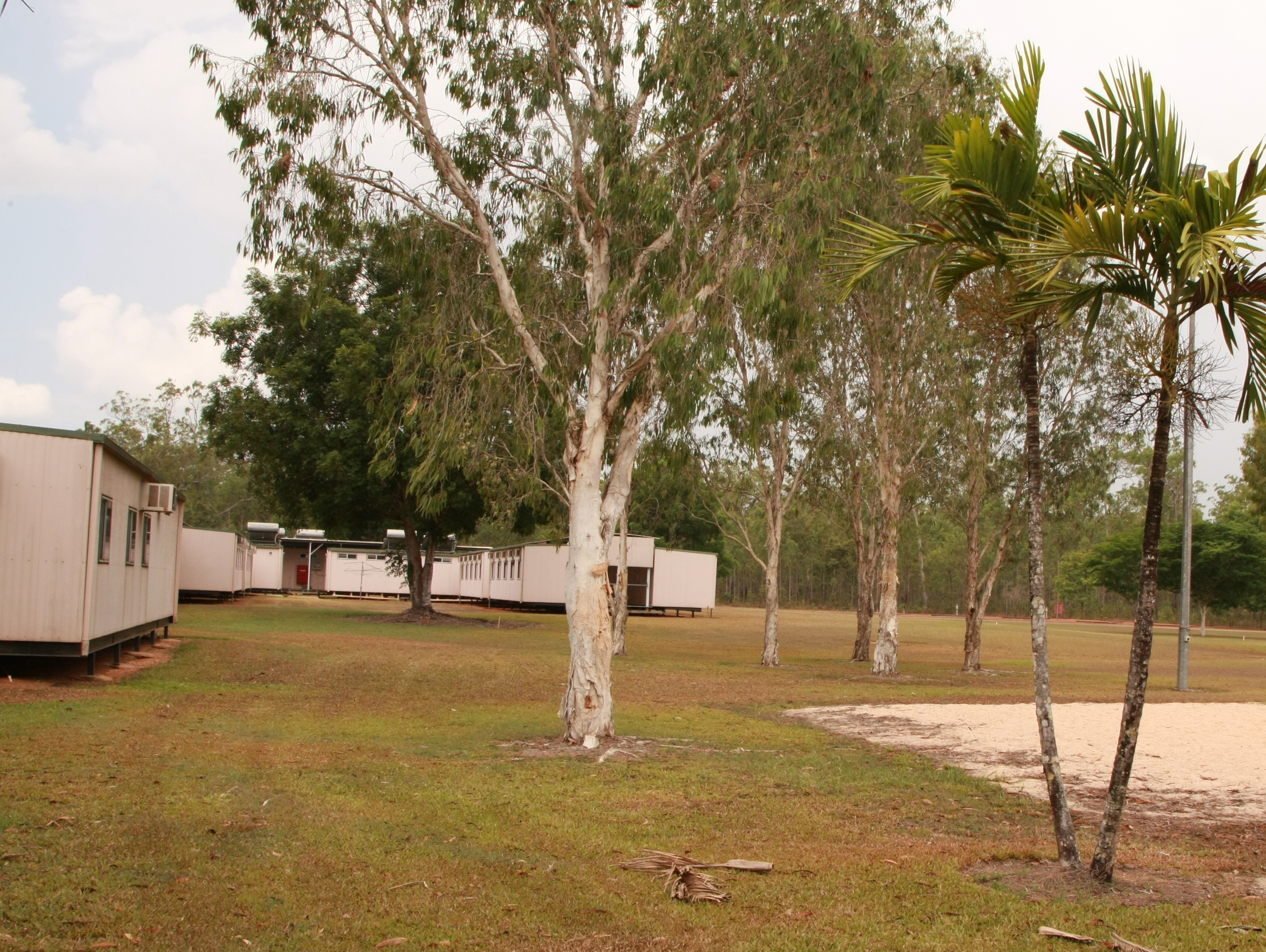
Former Weipa Immigrant Detention Centre, 2010. It closed in 2014.

Weipa has a visitor's centre, swimming pool, bowling green, golf club, tennis and squash courts. There are netball and basketball courts as well as football fields. Weipa Town Authority operates a public library at Hibberd Drive in Weipa.

At Nanum the shopping precinct has a Woolworths supermarket, bakery, coffee shop, travel agent, clothing shop, post office, newsagency / sports shop and butchers. There is also a chemist, camping and fishing store and within walking distance is a gift shop, furniture and whitegoods store, credit union and government social security office. At Evans Landing there are a hardware store and a number of mechanical workshops.

St Joseph's Catholic Church is on Boundary Road at Rocky Point. It is within the Weipa Parish of the Roman Catholic Diocese of Cairns.

== Sport and recreation ==
A number of well-known sporting clubs represent the local area, including Cape York Boxing Club, Carpentaria Golf Club, Weipa BMX Club, Weipa Bowls Club, Weipa Darts Club, Weipa Dirt Kart Club, Weipa Gymnastic Club, Weipa Social Netball Club, Weipa Squash Club, Weipa Tennis Club and Snooker club Weipa Raders and Central Cape Suns rugby league clubs and Weipa Cricket Club who play home games at Andoom Oval.

Weipa Fishing Classic and Weipa Rodeo Association and Weipa Running Festival

== Gallery ==
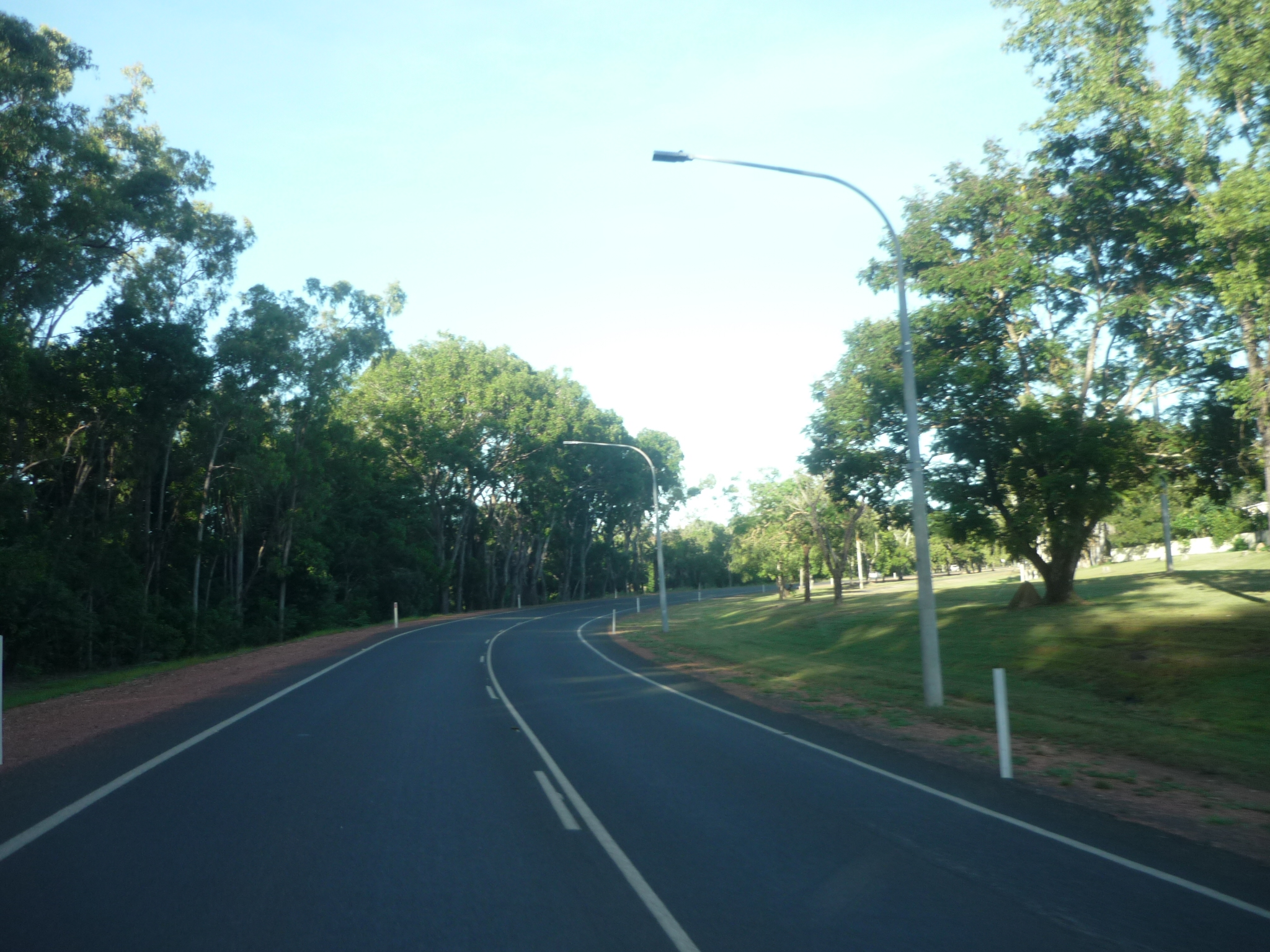
Main road through Weipa township

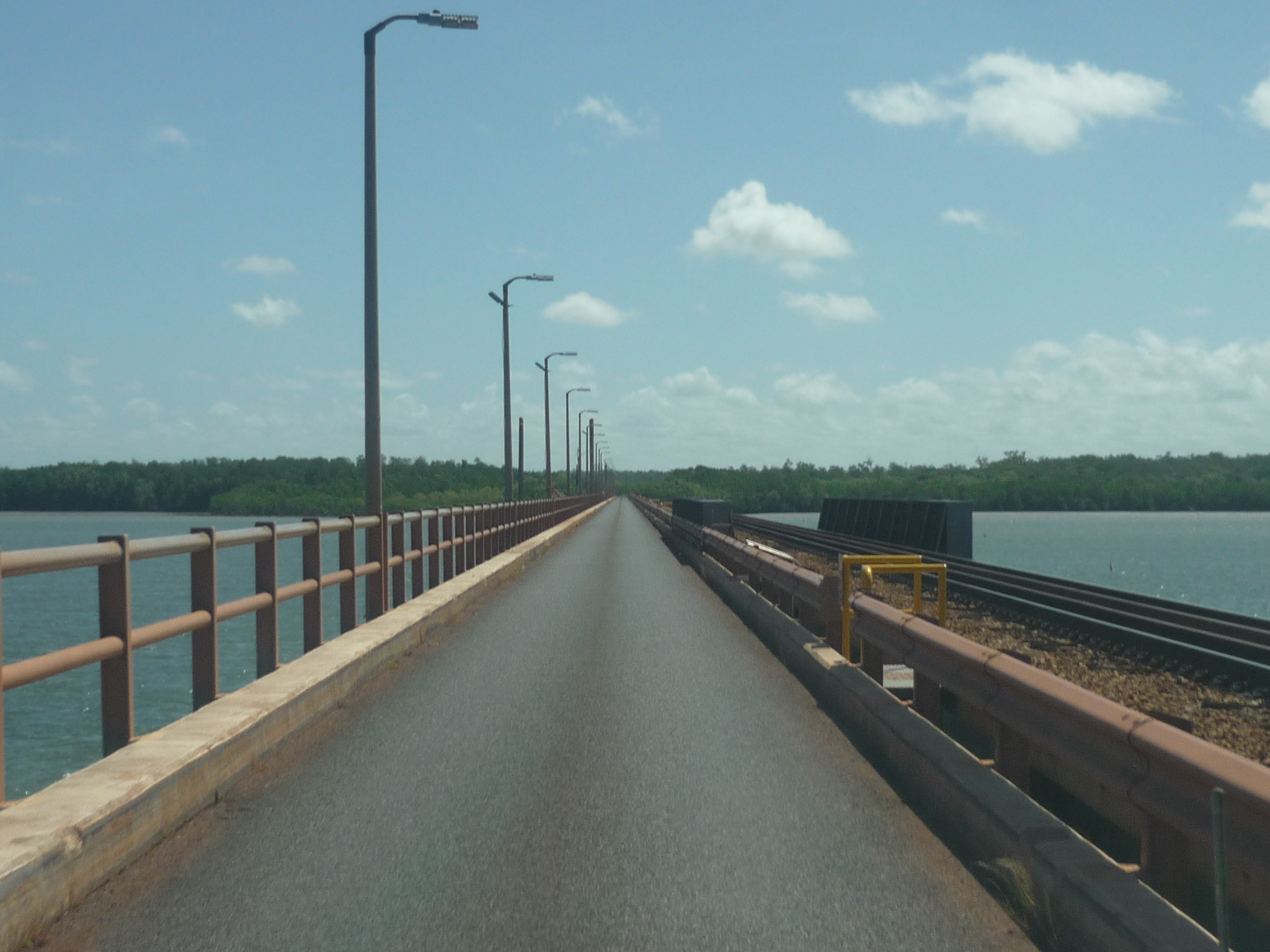
Weipa Mission River bridge

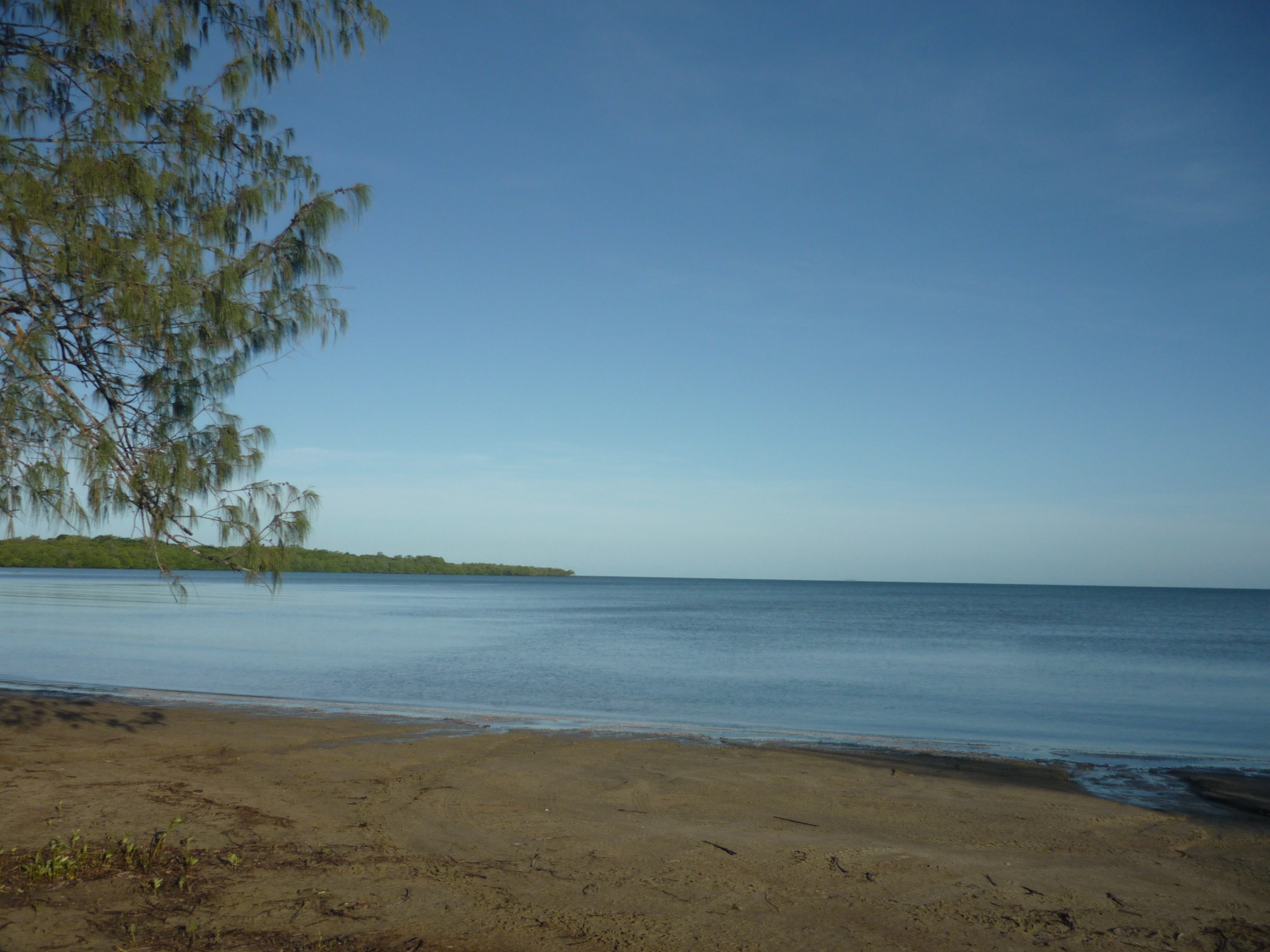
Coastal beach and bay near Wallaby Island

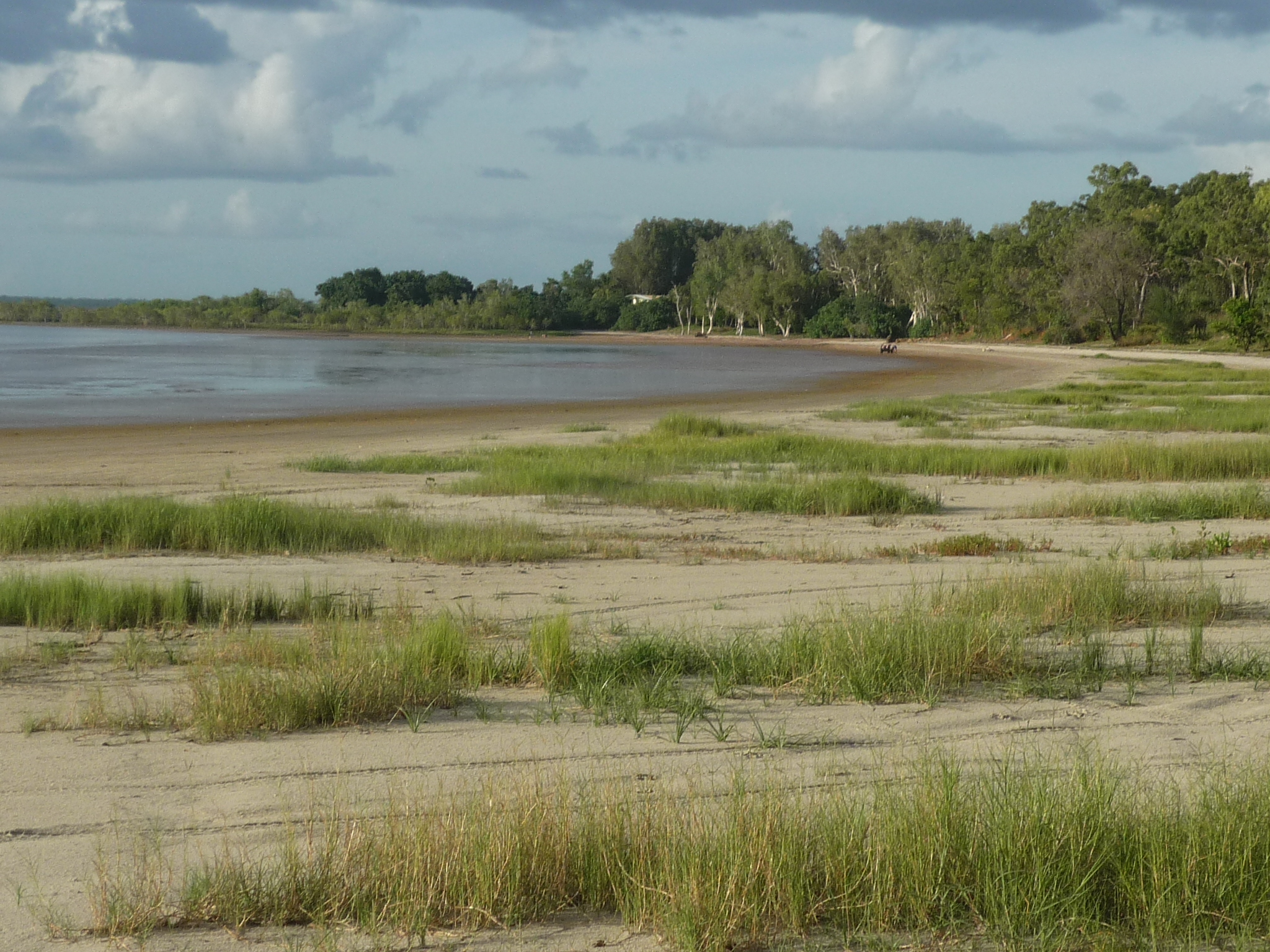
Coastal beach at Nanum suburb

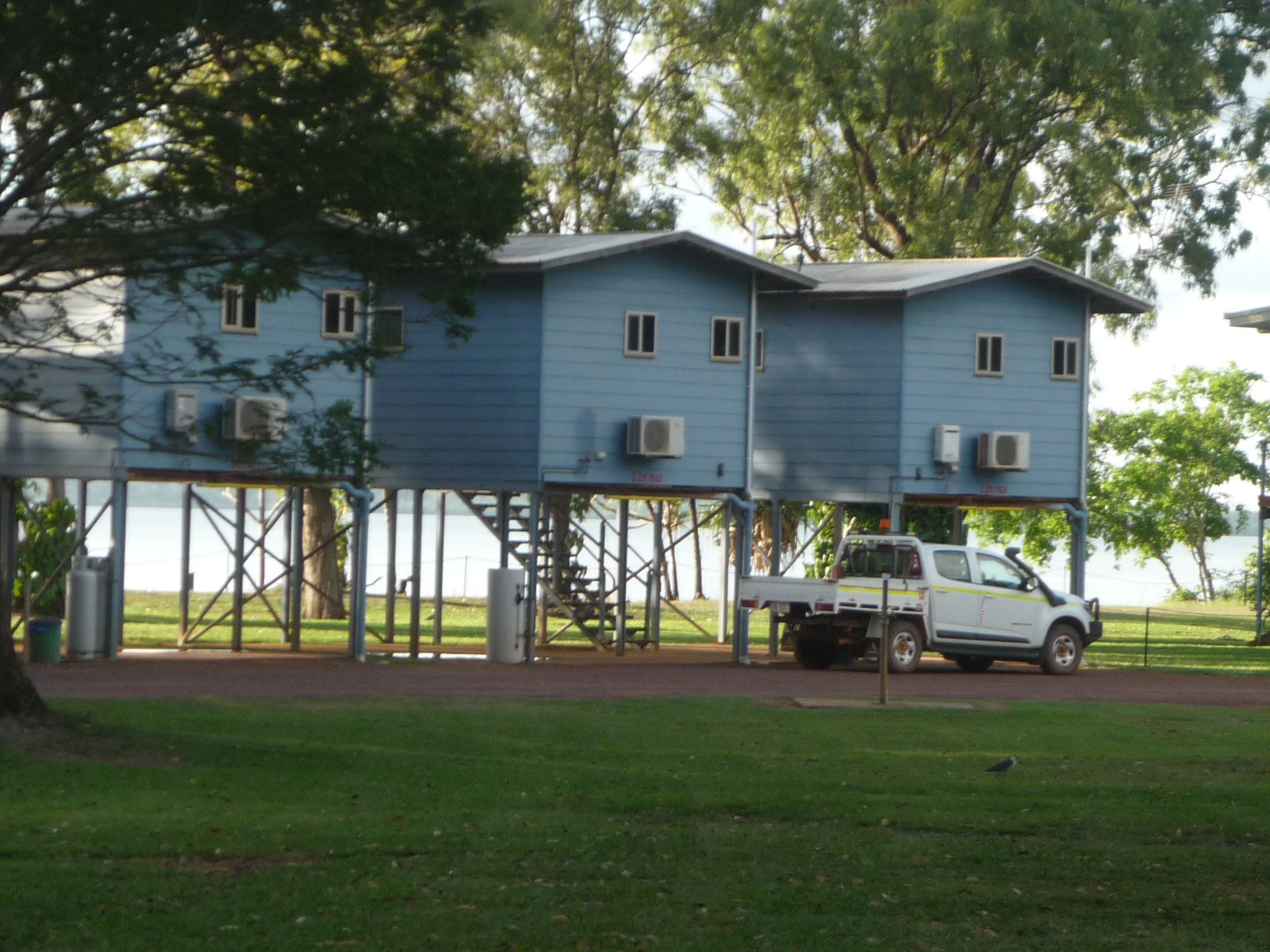
Raised cabins at caravan park near the beach

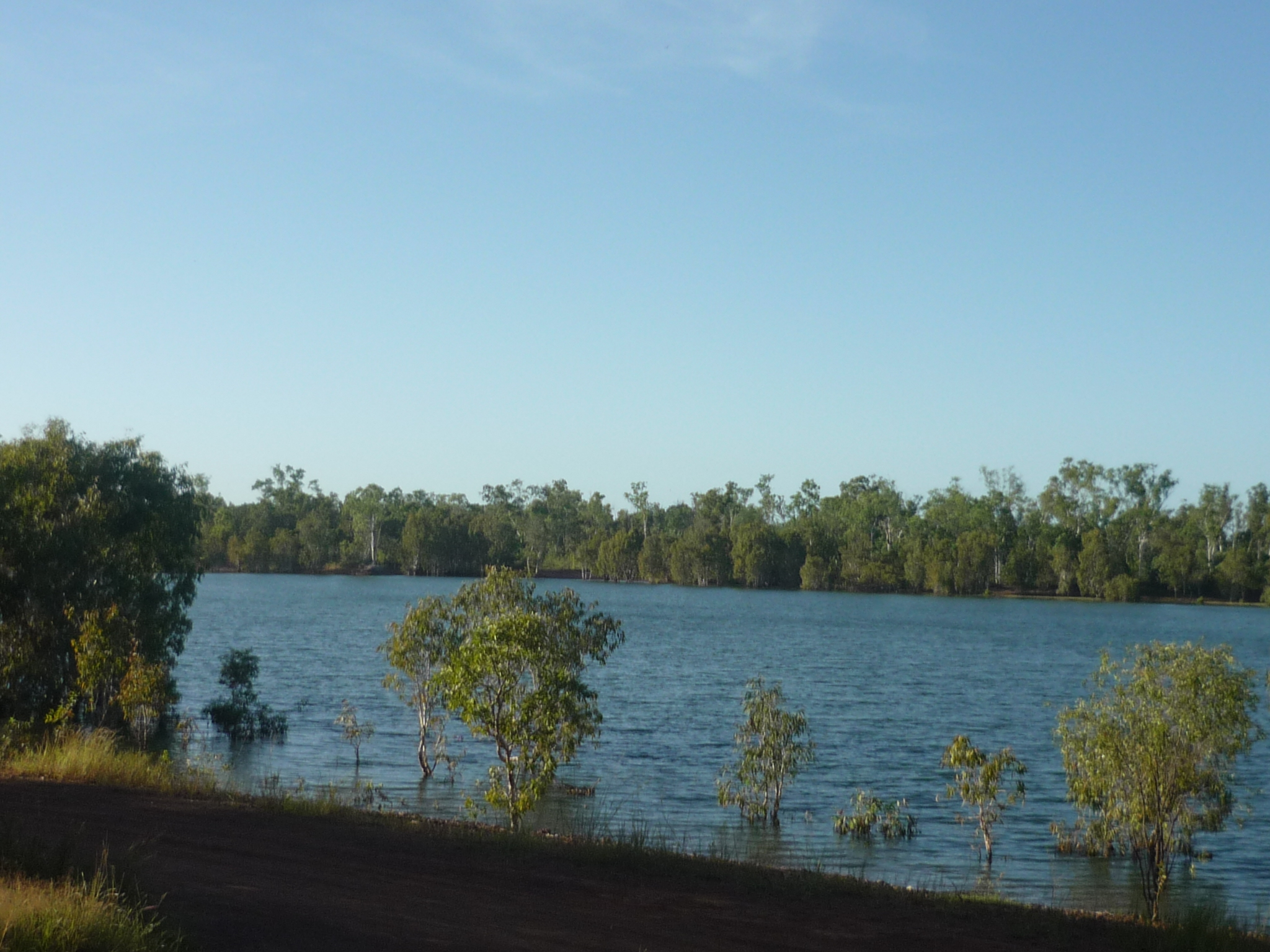
Former mining pit, now a freshwater pond

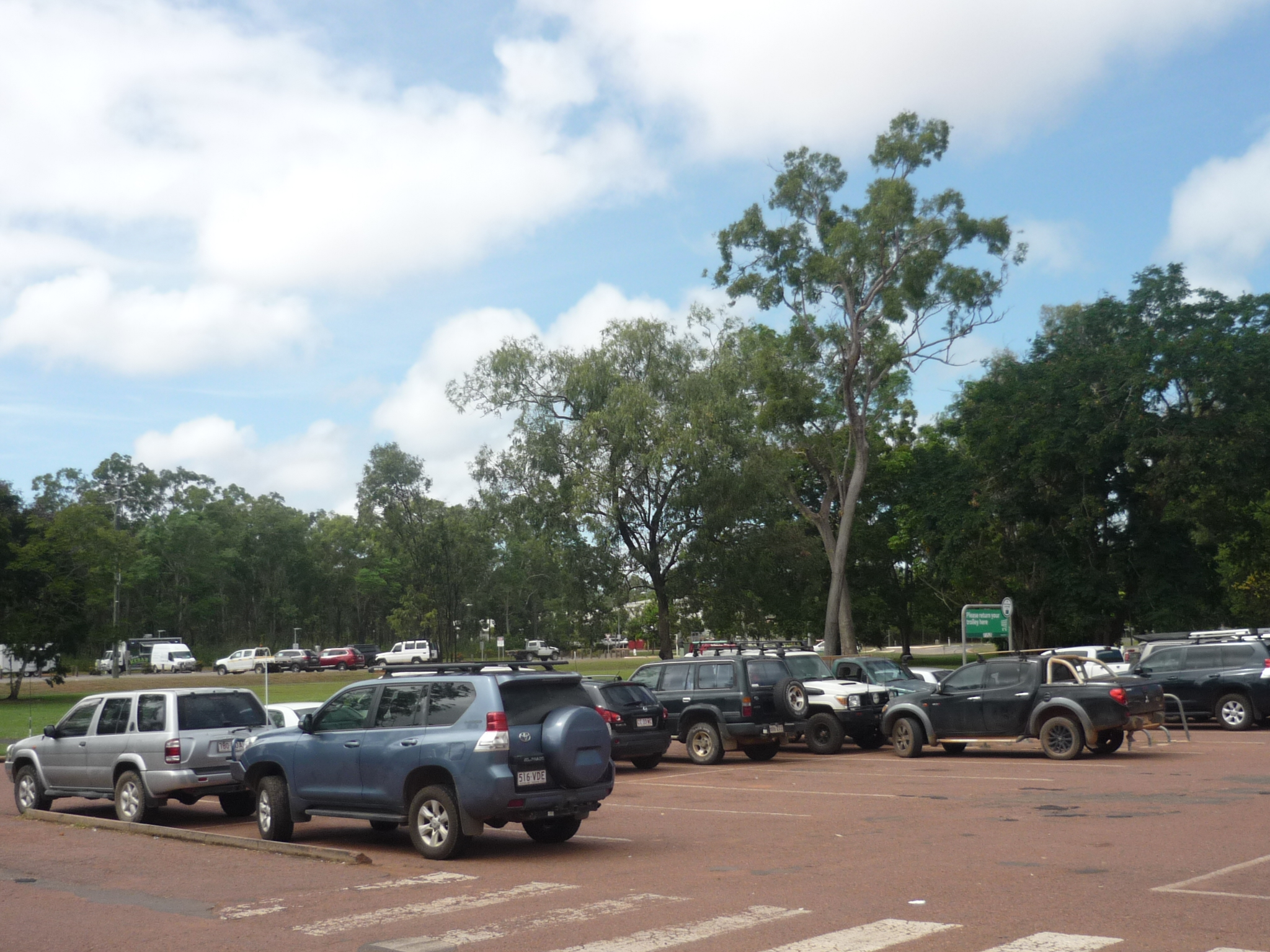
Car park at Woolworths shopping centre, mostly 4WDs

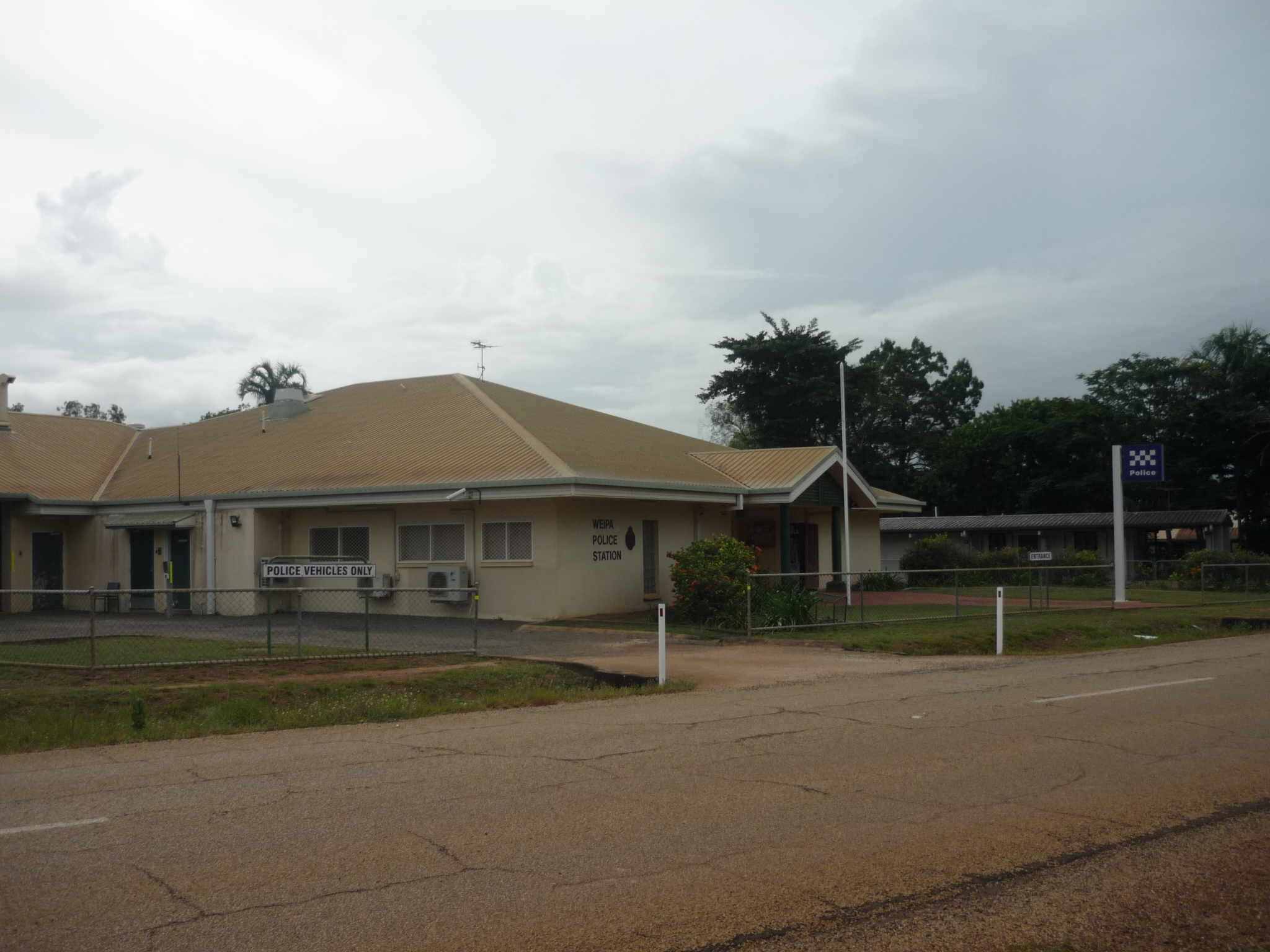
Weipa police station

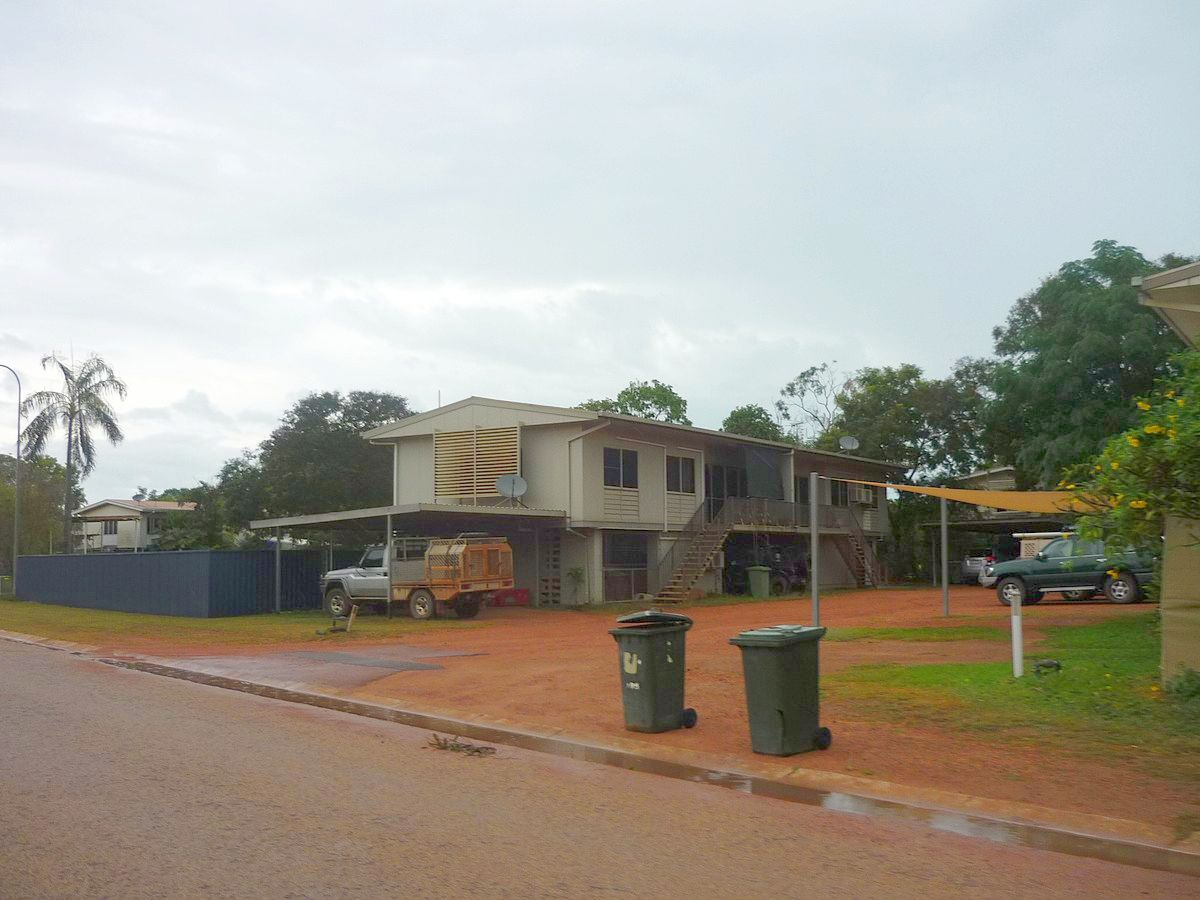
Standard style of housing in Trunding suburb

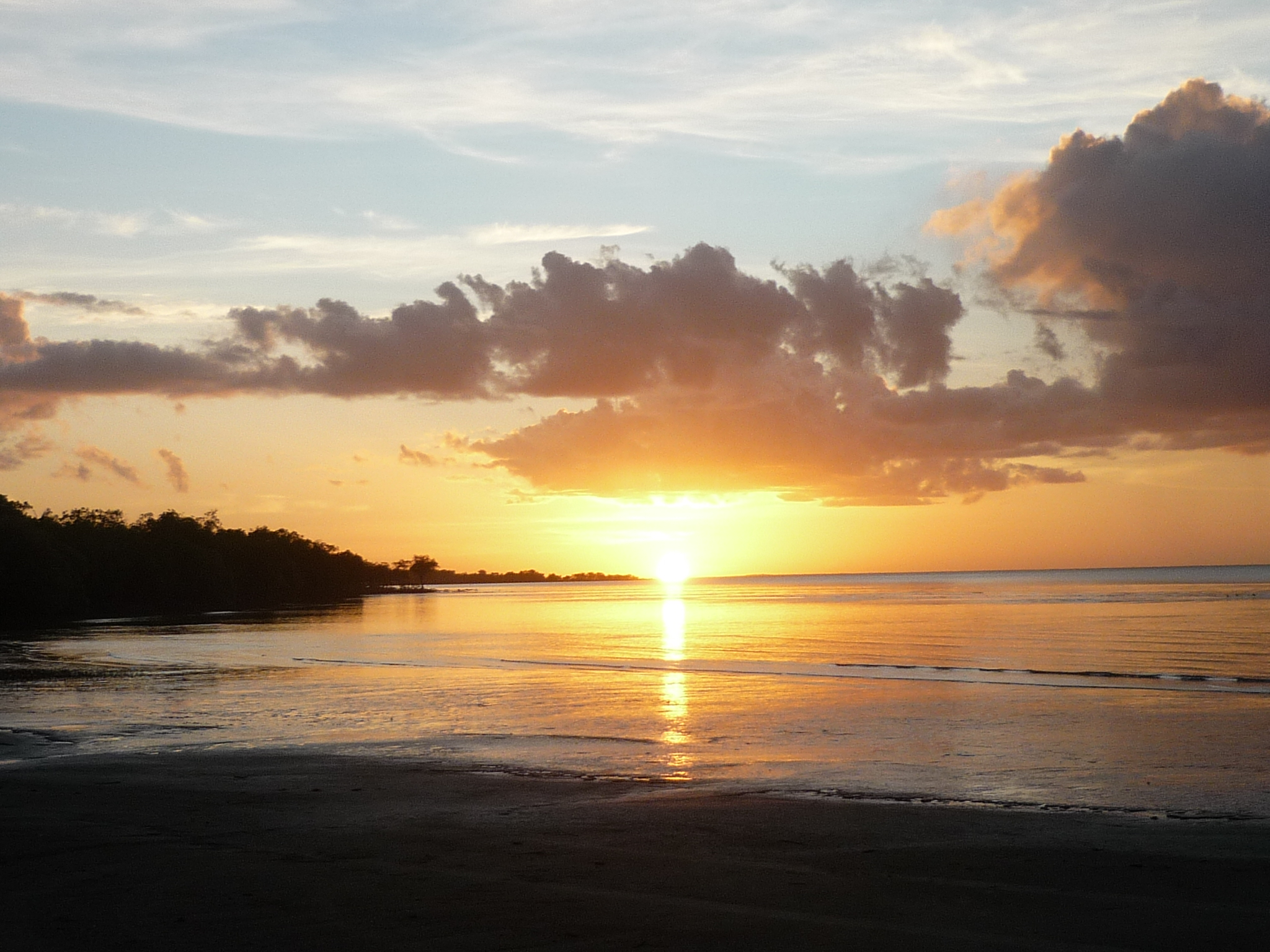
Sunset over the Gulf of Carpentaria

== See also ==
- Weipa Airport
- RAAF Base Scherger, also former site of Weipa Immigrant Detention Centre
