= Rocky Point, Queensland (Weipa Town) =

Rocky Point
- Suburb
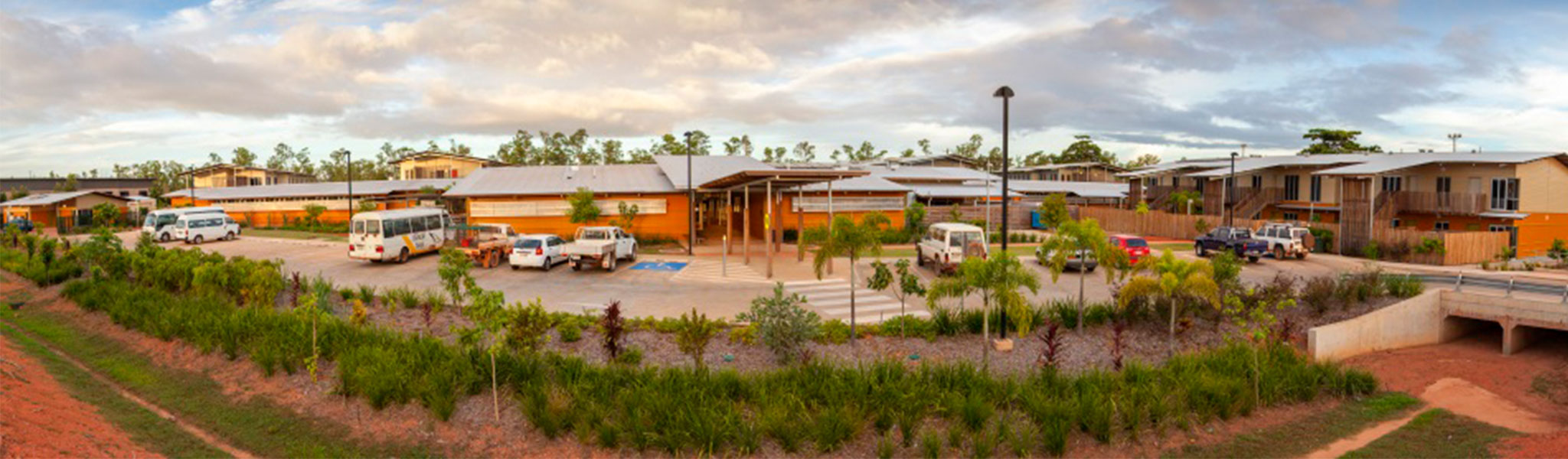
- Western Cape College, 2024

- Interactive map of Rocky Point
- Coordinates: 12.6188°S 141.8855°E
- Country: Australia
- State: Queensland
- LGA: Weipa Town
- Location: 649 km (403 mi) NNE of Cooktown; 181 km (112 mi) NNE of Cairns; 1,141 km (709 mi) NNE of Townsville; 2,497 km (1,552 mi) NNW of Brisbane

Government
  - State electorate: Cook
  - Federal division: Leichhardt

Area
  - Total: 4.7 km^{2} (1.8 sq mi)

Population
  - Total: 2,214 (2021 census)
  - Density: 471/km^{2} (1,220/sq mi)
- Time zone: UTC+10:00 (AEST)
- Postcode: 4874
Suburbs around Rocky Point
Albatross Bay	Albatross Bay	Mission River
Trunding	Rocky Point	Mission River
Trunding	Trunding	Mission River

Rocky Point is a residential locality in the Weipa Town, Queensland, Australia. In the 2021 census, Rocky Point had a population of 2,214 people.

== Geography ==
Over half of the land in Rocky Point is used for residential housing with the remainder undeveloped.

== History ==
Weipa North State School opened on 14 March 1966. On 1 January 2002, it became the Weipa campus of the Western Cape College.

== Demographics ==
In the 2016 census, Rocky Point had a population of 1,957 people.

In the 2021 census, Rocky Point had a population of 2,214 people. 22.5% of the population identified as Aboriginal Australian or Torres Strait Islander.

== Amenities ==
The Weipa Town Authority provides the Hibberd Library in Hibberd Drive.

St Joseph's Catholic Church is on Boundary Road at Rocky Point. It is within the Weipa Parish of the Roman Catholic Diocese of Cairns.

== Education ==
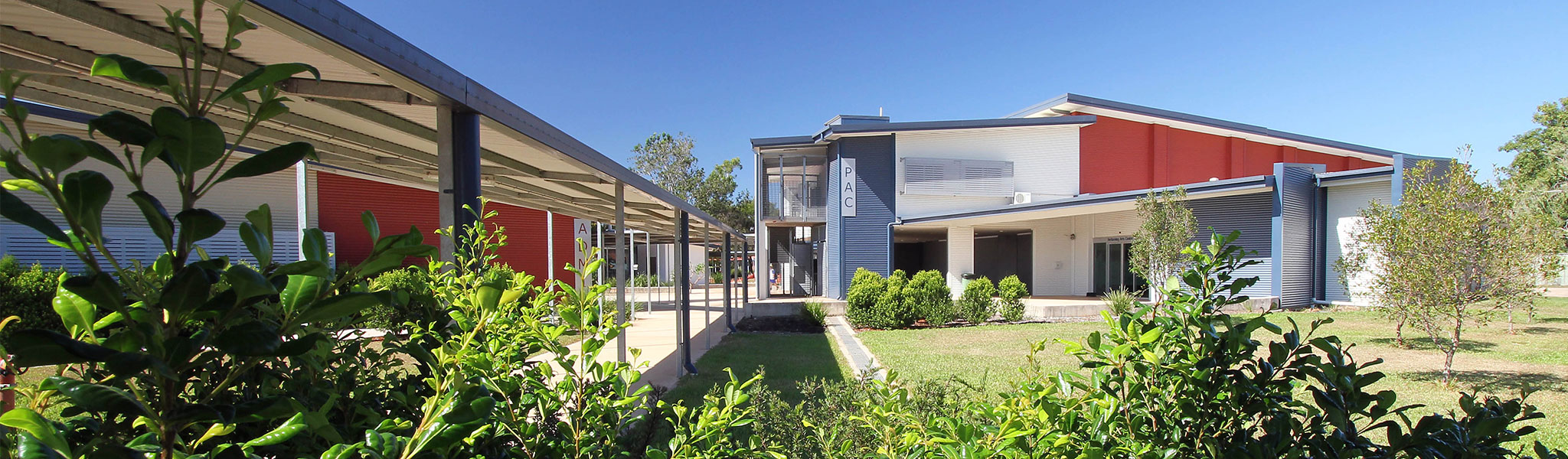
Western Cape College

Western Cape College is a government primary and secondary (Early Childhood to Year 12) school for boys and girls. Its Weipa Campus is at Central Avenue (12.6268°S 141.8801°E). In 2017, the school had an enrolment of 958 students with 88 teachers (85 full-time equivalent) and 76 non-teaching staff (62 full-time equivalent). It includes a special education program. It offers boarding facilities at Lot 50 Tamarind Road (12.6273°S 141.8897°E).
