= Jimmy (given name) =

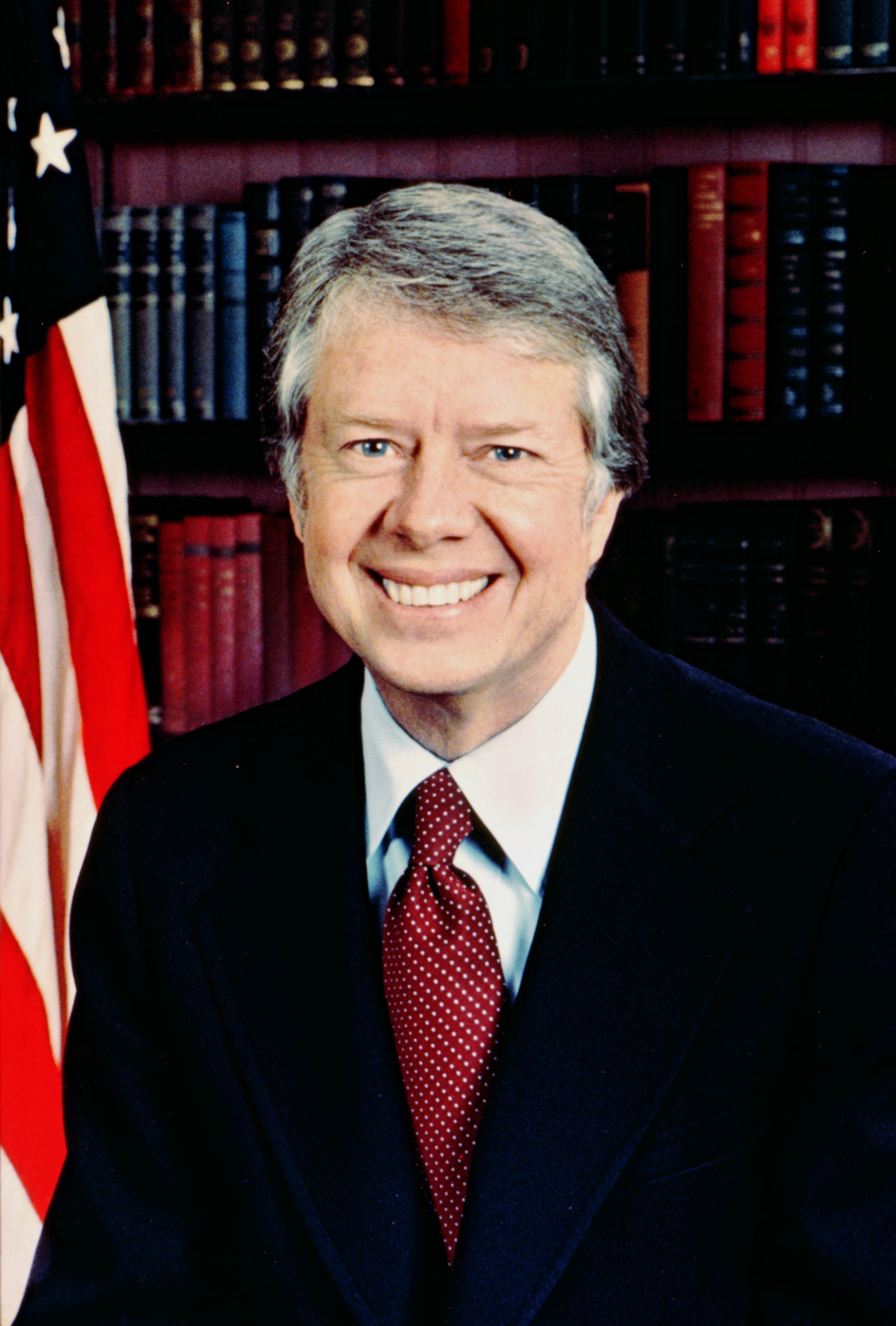
- Jimmy Carter's official portrait
- Pronunciation: /ˈdʒɪmi/ JIM-ee
- Gender: Male
- Language: English

Origin
- Languages: 1. Hebrew; 2. Latin; 3. English
- Origin: Diminutive form of James
- Derivation: James
- Region of origin: English-speaking world

Other names
- Alternative spelling: Jimmie; Jimmi; Jimi
- Related names: James, Jim, Jimi, Jimmie, Jimbo

Jimmy is a masculine given name. It is often used as a diminutive form of the given name James, along with its short form, Jim.

Both can also be used as the adaptation into English of the modern Greek name Dimitris (Δημήτρης) or the older Dimitrios (Δημήτριος), especially amongst Greek immigrants in English-speaking countries, due the similarity in the sound of the short name Ντίμης/Dimi and Jimmy.

== People ==
- Jimmy Abegg (born 1954), American musician
- Jimmy Abrines (1900–1976), Scottish footballer
- Jimmy Abson (1920–2008), Canadian football player
- Jimmy Adair (1907–1982), American baseball coach, manager, and player
- Jimmy Aggrey (born 1978), English footballer
- Jimmy Akingbola (born 1978), Nigerian–English actor
- Jimmy Alapag (born 1977), Filipino–American basketball player
- Jimmy Alcock (born 1932), Venezuelan architect
- Jimmy Altham (born 1944), British philosopher
- Jimmy Archibald (1892–1975), Scottish footballer
- Jimmy Arias (born 1964), American tennis player
- Jimmy Armfield (1935–2018), English footballer and manager
- Jimmy Auby (born 1986), South African racing driver
- Jimmy Bain (1947–2016), Scottish bassist and musician
- Jimmy Barnes (born 1956), Scottish–Australian musician
- Jimmy Bartel (born 1983), Australian rules football player
- Jimmy Bartolotta (born 1986), American basketball player
- Jimmy Bell Jr. (born 2000), American football player
- Jimmy Bennett (born 1996), American actor
- Jimmy Bondoc (born 1975), Filipino composer, lawyer, musician, politician, singer, and songwriter
- Jimmy Buffett (1946–2023), American musician
- Jimmy Bullard (born 1978), English footballer, coach, and television personality
- Jimmy Butler (born 1989), American basketball player
- Jimmy Calderwood (1955–2025), Scottish footballer and manager
- Jimmy Capps (1939–2020), American guitarist
- Jimmy Carr (born 1972), British and Irish comedian
- Jimmy Carruthers (1929–1990), Australian boxer
- Jimmy Carter (1924–2024), American politician, 39th president of the United States
- Jimmy Caruthers (1945–1975), American racecar driver
- James Carter Cathcart (1954–2025), American voice actor
- Jimmy Chamberlin (born 1964), American drummer
- Jimmy Cheatham (1924–2007), American teacher and trombonist
- Jimmy Chin (born 1973), American professional climber and film director
- Jimmy Chua Hwa Soon (1971–1998), Singaporean murderer
- Jimmy Cliff (1944–2025), Jamaican singer and musician
- Jimmy Connors (born 1952), American tennis player
- Jimmy D'Anda, American drummer
- Jimmy Dawkins (1936–2013), American guitarist and singer
- Jimmy Dean (1928–2010), American singer
- Jimmy DeGrasso (born 1963), American drummer
- Jimmy Del Ray (1962–2014), American professional wrestler
- Jimmy Destri (born 1954), American keyboardist
- Jimmy Doolittle (1896–1993), American aviation pioneer
- Jimmy Dore (born 1965), American comedian
- Jimmy Durante (1893–1980), American actor and comedian
- Jimmy Durmaz (born 1989), Swedish footballer
- Jimmy Easson (1906–1983), Scottish footballer
- Jimmy Eddery (1922–1988), Irish jockey
- Jimmy Eldridge (born 1948), American politician
- Jimmy Elledge (1943–2012), American musician
- Jimmy Enabu (born 1988), Ugandan basketball player
- Jimmy Eriksson (born 1991), Swedish racecar driver
- Jimmy Esmond (1889–1948), American baseball player
- Jimmy Essex, English actor, dancer, and singer
- Jimmy Estacio (born 1986), Colombian footballer
- Jimmy Evert (1923–2015), American tennis coach and player
- Jimmy Failla (born 1976), American author, comedian, and radio host
- Jimmy Fallon (born 1974), American comedian
- Jimmy Farkarlun (born 2001), Liberian footballer
- Jimmy Farris (born 1978), American football player
- Jimmy Feehan (born 1995), Irish Gaelic footballer
- Jimmy Feigen (born 1989), American freestyle swimmer
- Jimmy Field (born 1940), American attorney and politician
- Jimmy Fitzmorris (1921–2021), American politician
- Jimmy Fratianno (1913–1993), Italian–American mobster
- Jimmy Jack Funk (born 1959), American professional wrestler
- Jimmy Gagnon, Canadian politician
- Jimmy Garoppolo (born 1991), American football quarterback
- Jimmy Garvin (born 1952), American professional wrestler
- Jimmy Gaudreau (born 1946), American mandolinist, singer, and songwriter
- Jimmy Gilligan (born 1964), English footballer
- Jimmy Gomez (born 1974), American politician
- Jimmy Governor (1875–1901), Indigenous Australian outlaw
- Jimmy Lee Gray (1948–1983), American criminal
- Jimmy Greaves (1940–2021), English footballer
- Jimmy Greenhoff (born 1946), English footballer
- Jimmy Greenspoon (1948–2015), American composer and keyboardist
- Jimmy Gressier (born 1997), French long-distance runner
- Jimmy Griffin (1943–2005), American guitarist, singer, and songwriter
- Jimmy Halliday (1927–2013), Scottish author, historian, and politician
- Jimmy Hallinan (1849–1879), Irish–American baseball player
- Jimmy Hallybone (born 1962), English footballer
- Jimmy Hampson (1906–1938), English professional footballer
- Jimmy Hart (born 1944), American professional wrestling manager, executive, composer, and musician
- Jimmy Haslam (born 1954), American businessman and sports executive
- Jimmy Havoc (born 1984), British professional wrestler
- Jimmy Herget (born 1993), American baseball player
- Jimmy Herring (born 1962), American musician
- Jimmy Heuga (1943–2010), American alpine ski racer
- Jimmy Hoffa (1913–1982), American labor union leader
- Jimmy Hogan (1882–1974), English footballer and coach
- Jimmy Horton (born 1956), American businessman and racing driver
- Jimmy Ibbotson (born 1947), American musician, singer, and songwriter
- Jimmy Ingram (1928–1998), American stock car racing driver
- Jimmy Insolo (born 1943), American racing driver
- Jimmy Iovine (born 1953), American entrepreneur, record executive, and media proprietor
- Jimmy Jacobs (born 1984), American professional wrestler
- Jimmy Jacobs (handballer) (1930–1988), American handball player and boxing manager
- Jimmy Jam (born 1959), American R&B/pop music producer
- Jimmy Jansson (born 1985), Swedish singer and songwriter
- Jimmy Jansson (politician) (born 1978), Swedish politician
- Jimmy Jeggo (born 1992), Australian soccer player
- Jimmy Jinks (1916–1981), English footballer
- Jimmy Jump (born 1976), American streaker
- Jimmy Kamande (born 1978), Kenyan cricket player
- Jimmy Kamghain (born 1992), French footballer
- Jimmy Kaparos (born 2001), Dutch–born Dominican footballer
- Jimmy Kazan (born 2007), Lebanese footballer
- Jimmy Keinhorst (born 1990), German rugby league footballer
- Jimmy Keohane (born 1991), Irish footballer
- Jimmy Kessler (1945–2022), American rabbi
- Jimmy Kimmel (born 1967), American television host
- Jimmy J. Kolker (born 1948), American diplomat
- Jimmy Korderas (born 1962), Canadian professional wrestling referee
- Jimmy Lai (born 1948), Hong Kong activist and entrepreneur
- Jimmy Lambert (born 1994), American baseball player
- Jimmy Lang (1851–1929), Scottish footballer
- Jimmy Lavender (1884–1960), American baseball player
- Jimmy Leadbetter (1928–2006), Scottish footballer and manager
- Jimmy Lifton (born 1955), American musician and film producer
- Jimmy Liu (born 2002), Taiwanese actor
- Jimmy López (born 1978), Peruvian composer
- Jimmy Lovelace (1940–2004), American drummer
- Jimmy Lumsden (born 1947), Scottish footballer and manager
- Jimmy Maurer (born 1988), American soccer player
- Jimmy McCulloch (1953–1979), Scottish musician
- Jimmy McGriff (1936–2008), American organist and organ trio bandleader
- Jimmy McGrory (1904–1982), Scottish footballer
- Jimmy McLarnin (1907–2004), Irish boxer
- Jimmy McMillan (born 1946), American political activist
- Jimmy Merchant (born 1940), American musician and singer
- Jimmy Monaghan (born 1988), American–born Irish musician
- Jimmy Morales (born 1969), Guatemalan actor, comedian, and politician, 50th President of Guatemala
- Jimmy Moreland (born 1996), American football player
- Jimmy Naifeh (born 1939), American politician
- Jimmy Nicholl (born 1956), Northern Irish footballer
- Jimmy Osmond (born 1963), American singer and businessman
- Jimmy Osting (born 1977), American baseball player
- Jimmy Page (born 1944), English guitarist
- Jimmy Pahun (born 1962), French politician
- Jimmy Palmiotti (born 1961), American inker and writer
- Jimmy Panetta (born 1969), American lawyer and politician
- Jimmy Paredes (born 1988), Dominican baseball player
- Jimmy Pardo, American stand-up comedian and actor
- Jimmy Patronis (born 1972), American politician
- Jimmy Peirson (born 1992), Australian cricket player
- Jimmy Piersall (1929–2017), American baseball player
- Jimmy Pofahl (1917–1984), American baseball player
- Jimmy Ponder (1946–2013), American guitarist
- Jimmy Rane (born 1947), American businessman
- Jimmy Raney (1927–1995), American guitarist
- Jimmy Rankin (born 1964), Canadian guitarist, singer, and songwriter
- Jimmy Ray (born 1970), English singer
- Jimmy Reed (1925–1976), American musician and songwriter
- Jimmy Rees (born 1987), Australian actor
- Jimmy Rolder (born 2004), American football player
- Jimmy Rollins (born 1978), American baseball player
- Jimmy Ruffin (1936–2014), American singer
- Jimmy Rushing (1901–1972), American pianist and singer
- Jimmy Savile (1926–2011), British television and radio personality
- Jimmy Sayer (1862–1922), English footballer
- Jimmy Serrano (born 1977), American baseball player
- Jimmy Shea (born 1968), American skeleton racer
- Jimmy Sheirgill (born 1970), Indian actor
- Jimmy Siemers (born 1982), American water skier
- Jimmy Smits (born 1955), American actor
- Jimmy Snuka (1943–2017), Fijian–American professional wrestler
- Jimmy Spithill (born 1979), Australian sailor
- Jimmy Staten (born 1991), American football player
- Jimmy Swaggart (1935–2025), American Pentecostal televangelist
- Jimmy Taenaka (born 1964), Singaporean–American actor
- Jimmy Takter (born 1960), Swedish harness racing horse trainer
- Jimmy Tarbuck (born 1940), English actor, comedian, singer, and game show host
- Jimmy Tarlau (born 1948), American politician
- Jimmy Tatro (born 1992), American actor and comedian
- Jimmy Thackery (born 1953), American musician, singer, and songwriter
- Jimmy Thelin (born 1978), Swedish footballer and coach
- Jimmy Thörnfeldt (born 1976), Swedish songwriter and record producer
- Jimmy Tillette (born 1950), American basketball coach
- Jimmy Tremeer (1874–1951), English hurdler
- Jimmy Urine (born 1969), American musician, singer, and songwriter
- Jimmy Uso (born 1985), American professional wrestler
- Jimmy Valiant (born 1942), American professional wrestler
- Jimmy Vee (born 1959), Scottish actor, puppeteer, and stunt performer
- Jimmy Wakely (1914–1982), American actor and singer
- Jimmy Wales (born 1966), American–British entrepreneur, co-founder of Wikipedia
- Jimmy Wargh (born 1976), Finnish football executive, coach, and former player
- Jimmy Wayne (born 1972), American author, singer, and songwriter
- Jimmy Weinert (born 1951), American motorcycle racer
- Jimmy Weldon (1923–2023), American actor, ventriloquist, and television host
- Jimmy Whalen (1920–1944), Canadian fighter pilot
- Jimmy Whalen (baseball) (1880–1915), American baseball player
- Jimmy Whelan (1890–1929), American baseball player
- Jimmy Wilkerson (1981–2024), American football player
- Jimmy Wong (born 1987), American musician
- Jimmy Work (1924–2018), American singer and songwriter
- Jimmy Workman (born 1980), American child actor
- Jimmy Yacabonis (born 1992), American baseball player
- Jimmy O. Yang (born 1987), Hong Kong–American actor and comedian
- Jimmy Zámbó (1958–2001), Hungarian singer
- Jimmy Zambrano (born 1967), Colombian accordion player

== Fictional characters ==
- St. Jimmy, a character from the rock opera American Idiot
- Jimmy the Robot, a character in The Aquabats! Super Show!
- Anil "Jimmy", protagonist of the 1982 Indian film Disco Dancer, played by Mithun Chakraborty
- Jimmy, a character from Ed, Edd n Eddy
- Jimmy, a main character in the 2019–2020 Sarah Andersen comic series Fangs
- Jimmy, a character in the 2005 film version of King Kong
- Jimmy, main villain in the 2018 Indian film Mard Ko Dard Nahi Hota, played by Gulshan Devaiah
- Jimmy, player character in Mouthwashing
- The Jimmy, a character who has a habit of referring to himself in the third person on the 105th episode of Seinfeld
- Jimmy, aka Blanka, a character in the Street Fighter video game series
- Jimmy the Idiot Boy, a character created by John Kricfalusi
- Jimmy (raven), a raven who appeared in over 1000 films
- Jimmy Altieri, a character from The Sopranos
- Jimmy Bones, character and main antagonist from the 2001 horror film Bones
- Jimmy Crystal, a character from the animated film Sing 2
- James "Jimmy" De Santa, a character from Grand Theft Auto V
- Jimmy Falcone, a character from Fugget About It
- Jimmy Five, a character in the Brazilian comic series Monica's Gang
- Jimmy Gourd, a character in the Christian computer-animated direct-to-video series VeggieTales
- Jimmy Hopkins, a character from the video game Bully
- Jimmy Hudson, a character in Marvel Comics' Ultimate Marvel universe
- Jimmy Kemp, a character from the 1984 television film Threads
- Jimmy Kudo, a character in the anime Case Closed
- Jimmy Lee, a character in the 1990s animated series Double Dragon
- Jimmy McGill, a character from Breaking Bad and protagonist of Better Call Saul
- Jimmy McNulty, a character from The Wire
- Jimmy Natale, a Marvel Comics supervillain known as the Vulture
- Jimmy Neutron, a character from Nickelodeon's The Adventures of Jimmy Neutron, Boy Genius
- Jimmy Olsen, a character who appears mainly in DC Comics' Superman stories
- Jimmy Osgood, a character in Static Shock
- Jimmy Pegorino, a character from the video game Grand Theft Auto IV
- Jimmy Shroff, a fictional Indian Army Lt. Col. in the 2019 Indian film War
- Jimmy Skunk, a character from the cartoon Fables of the Green Forest
- Jimmy Taylor (Jericho), character on TV series
- Jimmy Thang, aka Jimmy T., a character from the WarioWare series of video games
- Jimmy Two-Shoes, a character in the Canadian animated series of the same name
- Jimmy Valmer, a character from South Park

== See also ==
- Jimmy (disambiguation)
