= Jimi =

Jimi may refer to:

== Languages ==
- Jimi language (Cameroon)
- Jimi language (Nigeria)
- Jimi languages, a branch of the Chimbu–Wahgi languages in New Guinea

== Places ==
=== Papua New Guinea ===
- Jimi River
- Jimi Valley
- Jimi District
- Jimi Rural LLG

== Animals ==
- Dendropsophus jimi, a species of frog
- Parotocinclus jimi, a species of catfish
- Rhinella jimi, a species of toad
- Syncope jimi, a species of frog

== Media ==
- "Jimi", a song by Beastie Boys from their 1994 album, Some Old Bullshit
- Lulu and Jimi, a 2009 German drama film

== Misc ==
- Jimi system, administration system of ancient China
- A waist-cloth traditionally worn by Bharwad women in India

== People with the name ==
- Jimi Agbaje (born 1957), Nigerian pharmacist and politician
- Jimi Bani, Indigenous Australian actor
- Jimi Bellmartin (1949–2021), Dutch singer
- Jimi Bertucci (born 1951), Italian Canadian musician
- Jimi Bolakoro, Fijian rugby footballer
- Jimi Cauty (born 1956), British musician
- Jimi Constantine (born 1981), Finnish musician and actor
- Jimi Cravity (born 1984), American musician
- Jimi Dams (born 1963), Belgian-American artist
- Jimi Damu (1967–2018), New Zealand-based Fijian rugby union player
- Jimi Famurewa, British journalist and food critic
- Jimi Goodwin (born 1970), English musician
- Jimi Hendrix (1942–1970), American guitarist
- Jimi Heselden (1948–2010), British entrepreneur
- Jimi Hocking (born 1963), Australian musician
- Jimi Hope (1956–2019), Togolese musician, painter, and sculptor
- Jimi Jamison (1951–2014), songwriter and singer of the band Survivor
- Jimi Jules, Swiss musician and DJ
- Jimi Koroi (1943/1944–2022), Fijian military and police officer
- Jimi Lewis (born 1974), English field hockey player
- Jimi Manuwa (born 1980), American-born English mixed martial artist
- Jimi Mistry (born 1973), British actor
- Jimi Blue Ochsenknecht (born 1991), German actor and musician
- Jimi Petulla (born 1960), American filmmaker, entrepreneur, and educator
- Jimi Rasta (Albin Jarić, 1953–2023), Bosnian–Slovenian musician, painter, and mineralogist
- Jimi Salonen (born 1994), Finnish freestyle skier
- Jimi Shields (born 1967), Irish musician
- Jimi Simmons, American accused of murder
- Jimi Solanke (born 1942), Nigerian actor, singer, poet, and playwright
- Jimi Somewhere (born 1998), Norwegian singer-songwriter, music producer, and designer
- Jimi Tauriainen (born 2004), Finnish footballer
- Jimi Tenor (born 1965), Finnish musician
- Jimi Tunnell, American musician
- Hanako Jimi (born 1976), Japanese politician
- Shozaburo Jimi (born 1945), Japanese politician

== See also ==
- James (name)
- Jimmi
- Jimmie
- Jimmy (disambiguation)
