= Jimmi =

Jimmi is a given name. Notable people with the name include:

- Jimmi Accardi (fl. from 1972), American musician
- Jimmi Bredahl (born 1967), Danish boxer
- Jimmi Briceño (born 1986), Venezuelan road cyclist
- Jimmi Clay, a fictional character in the soap opera Doctors
- Jimmi Harkishin (born 1965), British actor
- Jimmi Klitland (born 1982), Danish football player
- Jimmi Madsen (born 1969), Danish cyclist
- Jimmi Saputra (born 1972), Indonesian businessman
- Jimmi Seiter (born 1945), American musician and manager
- Jimmi Simpson (born 1975), American actor
- Jimmi Therkelsen (born 1991), Danish BMX rider

== See also ==
- Jimmi, Sierra Leone, a village
- Jimmy (disambiguation)
- Jimmie
- Jimi
