= Jimmy =

Jimmy may refer to:

== Arts and entertainment ==
=== Film and television ===
- Jimmy (2008 film), a 2008 Hindi thriller directed by Raj N. Sippy
- Jimmy (1979 film), a 1979 Indian Malayalam film directed by Melattoor Ravi Varma
- Jimmy (2013 film), a 2013 drama directed by Mark Freiburger
- Jimmy (2026 film), a 2026 American biographical drama film about actor Jimmy Stewart
- "The Jimmy", a 1995 episode of the sitcom Seinfeld
- "Jimmy" (Quantum Leap), a 1989 episode
- "Jimmy" (Static Shock), a 2002 episode
- Jimmy: The True Story of a True Idiot, a 2018 Japanese-language comedy TV series
- "Jimmy" (Shifting Gears), a 2025 episode

==== Songs ====
- "Jimmy" (song), a song by M.I.A. from the 2008album Kala
- "Jimmy", a song by Irving Berlin, see also List of songs written by Irving Berlin
- "Jimmy", a song by Tones and I from her EP The Kids Are Coming
- "Jimmy", a song by Tool from their 1996 album Ænima
- "Jimmy", a song by dutch artist Boudewijn de Groot
- "Jimmy", a song by Jay Thompson for the 1967 film Thoroughly Modern Millie
- "St Jimmy", a song by Green Day from their 2004 album American Idiot

=== Other arts and entertainment ===
- Jimmy (musical), a 1969 musical
- Jimmy Awards, annual awards given by the Broadway League to high school musical theater performers in the United States

== People ==
- Jimmy (given name), including list of persons and fictional characters
- Jimmy (musician), (born 2000), Japanese rapper
- Jimmy Carter (1924–2024), the 39th President of the United States
- Jean Jimmy (1912–1991), Australian Aboriginal activist and politician
- Einar Gustafson, also known as "Jimmy", namesake of The Jimmy Fund charity program in Boston
- Jimmy Wales, Co-founder of Wikipedia

== Other uses ==
- Jimmy (TV channel), a satellite digital television channel in France
- Jimmy bar, a metal bar with a curved end used for forcing things open, or (as a verb), to use the described tool
- Jimmy hat, a slang term for a condom
- Jimmies, a decorative confection
- Doctor Jimmy, the main character from the rock opera Quadrophenia by the Who
- GMC Jimmy, several cars that share the name
- Hagström Jimmy, a guitar
- Jimmy, a groundhog of Sun Prairie, Wisconsin
- Jimmy, a nickname for the figure of Mercury on the insignia of some Signals Corps in the British army
- Jimmy Riddle, Cockney rhyming slang for urinating
- Jimmy, the main character from Mouthwashing (video game)

== See also ==
- James (disambiguation)
- Jimmy Jazz (disambiguation)
- Jimmy Jimmy (disambiguation)
- Jimmy legs (disambiguation)
- Jhimmy, a Congolese musician of the 1950s
- Jim (disambiguation)
- Jimi (disambiguation)
- Jimmie, a list of people with the name
- Jamey, a list of people with the name
