= Aboriginal Shire of Mapoon =

- Local government area

- Interactive map of Aboriginal Shire of Mapoon
- Coordinates: 11°21′S 142°20′E
- Country: Australia
- State: Queensland
- Region: Far North Queensland
- Council seat: Mapoon

Government
  - Mayor: Aileen Muriel Addo
  - State electorate: Cook
  - Federal division: Leichhardt

Area
  - Total: 537 km^{2} (207 sq mi)

Population
  - Total: 432 (2021 census)
  - Density: 0.8045/km^{2} (2.084/sq mi)
- Website: Aboriginal Shire of Mapoon
LGAs around Aboriginal Shire of Mapoon
Gulf of Carpentaria	Gulf of Carpentaria	Cook
Gulf of Carpentaria	Aboriginal Shire of Mapoon	Cook
Napranum	Napranum	Napranum

The Aboriginal Shire of Mapoon is a local government area in Far North Queensland, Australia. It is on the western coast of Cape York Peninsula on the Gulf of Carpentaria. In the 2021 census, the Aboriginal Shire of Mapoon had a population of 432 people.

== Geography ==
Most local government areas are a single contiguous area (possibly including islands). However, Aboriginal Shires are often defined as a number of disjoint areas each containing an Indigenous community. In the case of the Aboriginal Shire of Mapoon, there are three areas all within the locality of Mapoon (which is otherwise within the Shire of Cook), two to the north and south of the Wenlock River's mouth at the Gulf of Carpentaria and a third further up river.

== History ==
Mapoon was established on the traditional homelands of the Tjungundji (pronounced Choong-un-gee) people at Cullen Point in November 1891. The name Mapoon is believed to be an anglicised translation of a Tjungundji word meaning place where people fight on the sand-hills.

Before it came to be known as Mapoon, the site of this community had previously been called Batavia River Mission. Moravian missionaries, James Gibson Ward and Reverend John Nicholas Hey, established the missio in 1891. They are said to have brought several South Sea Islander men to Mapoon to assist them.

The Queensland Government forcibly removed many children from the Gulf of Carpentaria region to Mapoon when the mission became an industrial school under the Industrial and Reformatory Schools Act (1865) (Qld) in 1901. Mapoon’s status as an industrial school meant that it became an official location for the institutionalisation of Aboriginal children forcibly removed from their parents under this legislation.

Around this time, Aboriginal groups from the Pine and Pennefather Rivers began moving into the mission as the reserve was expanded south to incorporate the traditional lands of the Thanakwithi people.

Some of the traditional owner groups who eventually came to live at Mapoon include the Mpakwithi, Taepithiggi, Thaynhakwith, Warrangku, Wimarangga and Yupungathi peoples.

Mapoon was the first of four Presbyterian missions established by the government to curb the abuse of Aboriginal people in the marine industries. Reverend Hey reported that Tjungundji people had been "...decimated by the raids of the pearlers and the beche-de-mer men". Continued abuse and health problems suffered by Aboriginal divers led the government to ban this type of employment in 1903.

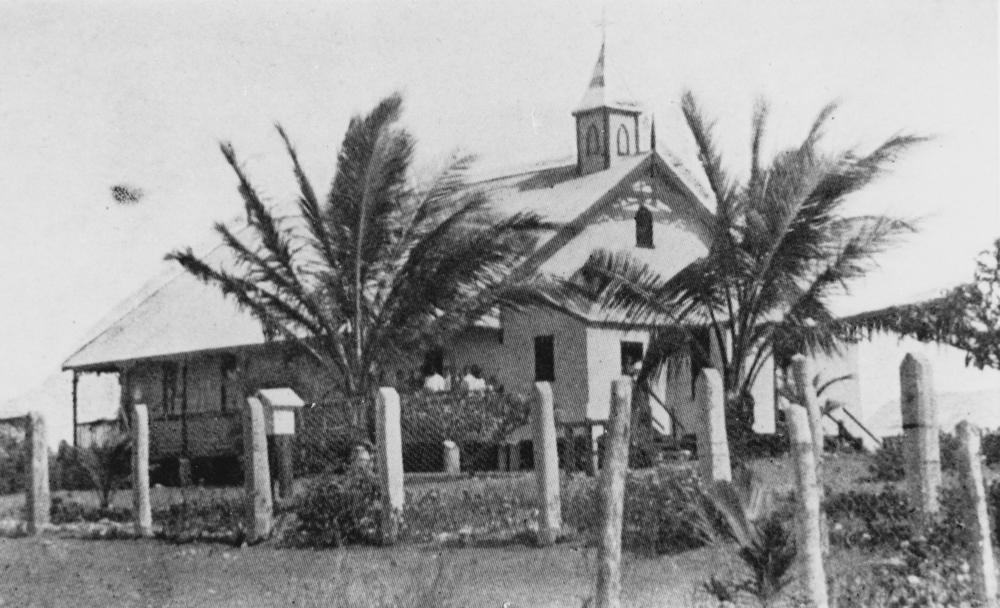
Church at Mapoon, 1919

W E Roth noted in a 1901 annual report that:

"Mapoon is the Mission Station to which hitherto we have been sending the waifs and strays from the Gulf country generally, but so far without the legal status of their being 'neglected' children as defined by the Reformatories Act. This has now been remedied, an Industrial School proclaimed, and Rev. N. Hey appointed its first Superintendent ... The Protectors are thus able to deal summarily with the Gulf children, and the State saved all the extra expenditure of forwarding them all round the Peninsula to the Aboriginal Reformatory at Cairns."

Between 1901 and 1910, around 70 young people were officially removed to Mapoon, mainly from Normanton, Cloncurry, Burketown, Thursday Island and Seven Rivers. Others came from stations such as Fiery Downs, Lawn Hills and Gregory Downs. Over the next 30 years, children were removed from all over Cape York Peninsula and placed on Mapoon, where many were adopted by traditional owners, who sought to provide them with a safe place.

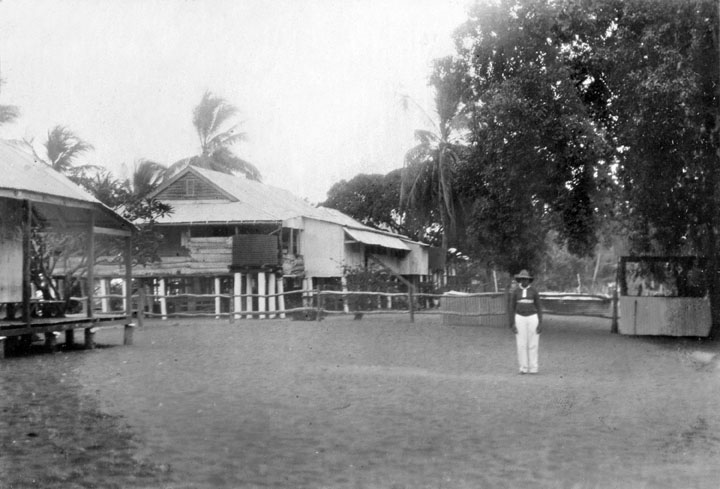
Mapoon, 1931

Between 1910 and 1970, only 30 people were officially removed to Mapoon from other areas, under the Protection Acts, mostly from Thursday Island and Yorke Downs.

Poor soil at Cullin Point necessitated the establishment of outstations to the south of Mapoon in the early 1900s, where mission residents lived and grew food crops. Children were housed in dormitories to facilitate their conversion to Christianity, schooling and training for domestic or rural work. In 1909, Reverend Hey was subjected to an official inquiry after he flogged and tarred a young dormitory woman. Hey was exonerated, but evidence published in newspapers drew attention to the cruelties of mission discipline.

Mapoon mission was underfunded throughout its history, and sanitation and housing shortages often caused health problems such as hookworm. In the 1920s, the mission supplemented grant funding by selling sandalwood and beche-de-mer, but these industries soon became unprofitable. In the 1930s, the mission relied on the compulsory financial contributions of residents deducted from the wages of those employed as domestics and stockmen outside the mission.

During World War II, Mapoon residents prepared to "go bush" in the event of a Japanese invasion. Residents endured food and medicine shortages and suffered from illness. The mission became reliant on child endowment monies to buy rations.

In the 1950s, a visiting Australian Government health team identified tuberculosis at Presbyterian missions. Their report described conditions at Mapoon as "nauseating", identifying malnutrition and water shortages, and describing dormitories as overcrowded and without beds. These conditions led residents of Presbyterian missions to protest. In 1953, Mapoon delegates went to Thursday Island to lobby the Director of Native Affairs, Cornelius O’Leary, for the dismissal of the then Superintendent Reverend R G Holmes and against his intention to relocate the mission to Red Beach. O’Leary and the Superintendent of Aurukun, Bill McKenzie, went to Mapoon to "restore order".

By 1954, the government was very critical of Presbyterian mission management, and began pressuring the Presbyterian Church to close Mapoon and Mornington Island missions. Most Mapoon residents strongly protested the closure, and conflict developed between the church, residents of the mission and the government, delaying the closure. The Presbyterian Church demanded the government acknowledge that long-term underfunding was equally to blame for mission conditions.

The Presbyterian Church was struggling financially and O’Leary refused further funding. The church threatened to walk out and residents continued to pressure the church, who informed O’Leary they would not try and convince the Mapoon people to move to Weipa, but would rely on changing attitudes as Weipa developed. O’Leary admitted to the Under-Secretary that the Presbyterians received substantially less funding than government-run settlements. By O’Leary’s conservative estimate, the Presbyterians should have received £61,075 to bring their missions up to par with Woorabinda. They received £39,500 in 1955/1956.

Comalco and Alcan began bauxite exploration on Mapoon and Weipa mission reserves in 1956, creating further confusion and conflict surrounding the future of the missions. Without consulting the church or residents, the government negotiated with Comalco to pass legislation in 1957 that facilitated mining on the majority of 2 mission reserves and northern parts of the Aurukun reserve. The legislation did not include any formal requirement to compensate Aboriginal communities affected by mining.

On 1 January 1958, Comalco was issued an 84-year lease covering an area from Vrilya Point in the north, south almost to Aurukun mission. Comalco surrendered the land on which the Mapoon mission was located.

From 1960, funding and services to Mapoon were withdrawn in an attempt to force people to relocate to New Mapoon, an area developed by the government to replace the old mission. By the end of 1962, around 162 people remained at Mapoon and, by July 1963, about 100 people had gone to New Mapoon. Those who remained at Mapoon continued campaigning against forced removal from their traditional homelands, and established alternative schooling and food supplies.

On 15 November 1963, Thursday Island Police arrived at Mapoon with instructions from the Director of Native Affairs, Patrick Killoran, to enforce the removal of 23 people to Bamaga. Several houses and buildings were burnt on the day to prevent their return, though a police report of this event has never been located. The remaining 70 people at Mapoon were transported to Weipa and New Mapoon between January and May 1964.

In 1965, the Queensland Government passed the Alcan Queensland Pty. Limited Agreement Act 1965. Aluminium Laboratories, a subsidiary company of the Canadian company Alcan, was granted a 105-year mining lease (ML7031, formerly Special bauxite lease No. 8) covering 1,690 square miles (4,400 km^{2}) in the hinterland behind Mapoon.

From the 1960s, Jean Jimmy and other former mission residents lobbied for the re-establishment of the community at Old Mapoon. In 1974, Jerry and Ina Hudson and several other families returned to Old Mapoon and, in 1984, established the Marpuna Aboriginal Corporation, which gradually built up community facilities.

The Mapoon Aboriginal reserve, previously held by the Queensland Government, was transferred on 26 April 1989 to the trusteeship of the Mapoon Land Trust under a Deed of Grant in Trust (DOGIT).

On 25 March 2000, after many years of lobbying for their own council, members of the Mapoon community elected five councillors to constitute an autonomous Mapoon Aboriginal Council under the Community Services (Aborigines) Act 1984. After its establishment, the Mapoon Aboriginal Council became one of the trustees of the Mapoon Land Trust.

On 1 January 2005, under the Local Government (Community Government Areas) Act 2004 (CGA), the Aboriginal Shire of Mapoon was established and the Mapoon Aboriginal Council became the Mapoon Aboriginal Shire Council.

== Demographics ==
In the 2016 census, the Aboriginal Shire of Mapoon had a population of 310 people.

In the 2021 census, the Aboriginal Shire of Mapoon had a population of 432 people.

== Mayors ==
- 2020–present: Aileen Muriel Addo

== Election results ==
=== 2024 ===
2024 Queensland local elections: Mapoon
Party	Candidate	Votes	%	±%
Independent	Allena Tabuai			
Independent	Janelle Ling			
Independent	Linda McLachlan			
Independent	Eli Tabuai			
Independent	Maria Pitt			
Independent	Justina Reid			
Independent	Sheree Jia			
Turnout				

== Attribution ==
This article incorporates CC-BY-4.0 content from "Mapoon". Aboriginal and Torres Strait Islander community histories. Queensland Government. 13 April 2015. Archived from the original on 21 May 2024.
