= Cururu toad =

Cururu toad is a common name used for several closely related large toads:

- Rhinella diptycha (synonym Rhinella schneideri) — from northern Argentina, Paraguay, Uruguay, eastern Bolivia, and eastern and southern Brazil
- Rhinella jimi — from northeastern Brazil
- Rhinella marina (cane toad) — widespread in Latin America and introduced elsewhere

== See also ==
- Yellow cururu toad (Rhinella icterica)
