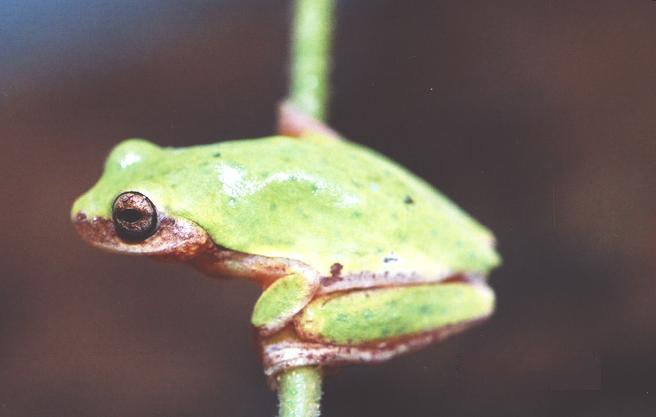

Conservation status
- Least Concern (IUCN 3.1)

Scientific classification
- Kingdom: Animalia
- Phylum: Chordata
- Class: Amphibia
- Order: Anura
- Family: Hylidae
- Genus: Dendropsophus
- Species: D. rubicundulus

Binomial name
- Dendropsophus rubicundulus (Reinhardt & Lütken, 1862)

Synonyms
- Hyla rubicundula Reinhardt and Lütken, 1862; Hyla elongata Lutz, 1925

= Dendropsophus rubicundulus =

Species of frog

Dendropsophus rubicundulus (common name: Lagoa Santa treefrog) is a species of frog in the family Hylidae. It is found in Bolivia and Brazil. Earlier records from Paraguay are probably based on misidentified Dendropsophus jimi and Dendropsophus elianeae, but it is still likely to be also found in that country.

Dendropsophus rubicundulus is very common in Brazil but not elsewhere. It is found in the cerrado ecoregion and inhabits emergent or marginal herbaceous vegetation near ponds, pools, or lagoons in open areas. It is suffering from habitat loss.
