= WETV =

WETV or WeTV may refer to:

- WETV (Florida), a defunct television station in Key West, Florida
- WeTV, the name of streaming service Tencent Video outside of China
- We TV, an American cable television channel marketed towards women
- WETV-CD, a defunct low-power television station (channel 11) formerly licensed to Murfreesboro, Tennessee, United States
- WABE-TV, a television station (channel 30 analog/21 digital) licensed to Atlanta, Georgia, United States, which used the call sign WETV until May 1984
- WNEX-TV, a television station (channel 47) in Macon, Georgia, United States, which used the call sign WETV from 1953 to 1954
- The part-owners, and license name, of The Ecology Channel, a defunct Canadian specialty channel
