= LNJ =

LNJ or lnj may refer to:

- Liberty N' Justice, an American Christian hard rock band
- The Longview News-Journal, the main newspaper of the city of Longview, Texas
- LNJ, the IATA code for Lincang Airport, Yunnan Province, China
- lnj, the ISO 639-3 code for Linngithigh dialect, a defunct Paman language formerly spoken in Queensland, Australia
