= Jimmy Jimmy =

Jimmy Jimmy may refer to:

- Jimmy Jimmy (band), an English band
- "Jimmy Jimmy" (song), by the Undertones
- "Jimmy Jimmy", a song by Ric Ocasek from the album Beatitude
- "Jimmy Jimmy", a song by Madonna from the album True Blue
- "Jimmy Jimmy Aaja Aaja", a Bollywood song from the film Disco Dancer
- "Jimmy Jimmy", a song by Gorillaz from their 2021 EP Meanwhile
- "Jimmy" (song), a song by M.I.A.

== See also ==
- "Jimmy's Jimmy", 2001 episode of American television sitcom Yes, Dear
- Jimmy Two-Shoes, the cartoon for which this is the Italian name
- Jimmy (disambiguation)
