= Accardi =

Accardi is an Italian surname. Notable people with the surname include:

- Andrea Accardi (born 1995), Italian footballer
- Angelo Accardi (born 1964), Italian visual artist
- Carla Accardi (1924–2014), Italian painter
- Gimena Accardi (born 1985), Argentine actress and model
- Giuseppe Accardi (born 1964), Italian footballer agent and former player
- Jimmi Accardi (fl. from 1972), American musician, songwriter, and music producer
- Maria T. Accardi (fl. from 2010), academic in the field of library science
- Millicent Borges Accardi (fl. from 1993), Portuguese-American poet
- Pietro Accardi (born 1982), Italian retired footballer
- Settimo Accardi (1902–1977), Sicilian-American mobster
- Ugo Attardi (1923–2006), Italian painter, sculptor and writer
- Vincent Accardi (fl. from 2000), American guitarist musician former of the Brand New
