= Ndra'ngith language =

Extinct Australian Aboriginal language

Ndra'ngith
- Native to: Australia
- Region: Cape York Peninsula, Queensland
- Ethnicity: Winduwinda
- Extinct: (date missing)
- Language family: Pama–Nyungan: Paman; North Cape York; Northern; Anguthimri; Ndra'ngith

Language codes
- ISO 639-3: dgt
- Glottolog: ndra1239
- AIATSIS: Y39

Ndra'ngith (Ntra'angith) is an extinct Australian language once spoken in the Cape York Peninsula of Queensland. Donohue (1991) identifies Ndra'ngith as the same dialect as Ntrwa'ngayth, but Sutton (2001) presents it as being distinct. Sutton also distinguishes it from the similar-sounding Ndrangith language and Ndwa'ngith language.

== Phonology ==
=== Consonants ===
	Peripheral		Laminal		Apical		Glottal
	Bilabial	Velar	Palatal	Dental	Alveolar	Retroflex	Glottal
Plosive	p	k	c	t̪	t		ʔ
Fricative	β	ɣ		ð			
Nasal	m	ŋ	ɲ	n̪	n		
Post-trilled					tʳ		
Vibrant					r		
Approximant	w		j		l	ɻ	

=== Vowels ===
	Front	Back
High	i	u
Mid	e	
Low	a	
