= Ndwa'ngith language =

Language of Australia

Ndwa'ngith
- (unattested)
- Native to: Australia
- Region: Cape York Peninsula, Queensland
- Extinct: (date missing)
- Language family: Pama–Nyungan: Paman; North Cape York; Northern; Ndwa'ngith

Language codes
- ISO 639-3: None (mis)
- Glottolog: None
- AIATSIS: Y205

Ndwa'ngith was apparently an Australian language once spoken in the Cape York Peninsula of Queensland. It is undocumented, without even word lists to record it.

Sutton (2001) distinguishes Ndwa'ngith from the similar-sounding Northern Paman languages Ndra'ngith, Ndrangith, and Ntrwa'ngayth.
