= Andjingith language =

Extinct Australian Aboriginal language

Andjingith
- Native to: Australia
- Region: Cape York Peninsula, Queensland
- Extinct: (date missing)
- Language family: Pama–Nyungan: Paman; North Cape York; Northern; Andjingith

Language codes
- ISO 639-3: None (mis)
- Glottolog: None
- AIATSIS: Y42

Andjingith is an extinct Australian Aboriginal language once spoken in Cape York in Queensland. The traditional language area of Andjingith includes the Aurukun Community Council and the Cook Shire.

== Classification ==
Andjingith may also be known by the following names: Anjingid, Andjingid, Andjingith, Adyingid.

Tindale (1974) says that Winduwinda is a cover term for twelve or more small groups each with a name terminating in '-ngit'. This suggests that Andjingith might be a Winduwinda group name, despite Tindale not listing it.
