= Abrines =

Abrines is a surname. Notable people with the surname include:

- Álex Abrines (born 1993), Spanish basketball player
- Jimmy Abrines (1900–1976), Scottish footballer
