= Arritinngithigh language =

Extinct Australian aboriginal language spoken in Cape York

Aritinngithigh
- Native to: Australia
- Region: Cape York Peninsula, Queensland
- Ethnicity: Winduwinda
- Extinct: (date missing)
- Language family: Pama–Nyungan: Paman; North Cape York; Northern; Aritinngithigh
- Dialects: Aritinngithigh; Latamngit?

Language codes
- ISO 639-3: rrt
- Glottolog: arit1239
- AIATSIS: Y34 Aritinngithigh, Y30 Ladamngid

Aritinngithigh (Aritinngayth, Arraythinngith) is an Australian Aboriginal language once spoken in Cape York in Queensland.

== Phonology ==
=== Consonants ===
| | Peripheral | | Laminal | | Apical | |
| | Bilabial | Velar | Palatal | Dental | Alveolar | Retroflex |
|---|---|---|---|---|---|---|
| Plosive | p | k | c | t̪ | t | |
| Fricative | β | ɣ | | ð | | |
| Nasal | m | ŋ | ɲ | n̪ | n | |
| Post-trilled | | | | | tʳ | |
| Vibrant | | | | | r | |
| Approximant | w | | j | | l | ɻ |

=== Vowels ===
| | Front | Central | Back |
|---|---|---|---|
| High | i | ʉ | u |
| Near-low | æ | | |
| Low | a | | |
