= Mpakwithi dialect =

Extinct Australian Aboriginal dialect of Queensland

Mpakwithi
- Anguthimri
- Native to: Australia
- Region: Cape York Peninsula, Queensland
- Extinct: 1985
- Language family: Pama–Nyungan: Paman; North Cape York; Northern; Anguthimri; Mpakwithi

Language codes
- ISO 639-3: awg
- Glottolog: angu1242
- AIATSIS: Y186

Mpakwithi is an extinct Australian Aboriginal dialect of Queensland.

== Classification ==
Mpakwithi is generally regarded as a dialect of a broader Anguthimri language, which is part of the Northern Paman family.

== Phonology ==
=== Vowels ===
	Front	Back
Close	i iː ĩ y	u uː
Close-mid	e eː ẽ (ø)	o
Open-mid	æ æː æ̃	
Low	a aː ã	

/ø/ is found in only one word.

Mpakwithi has the most vowels of any Australian language, with 16–17. It also is one of the only Australian language to have nasal vowels.

=== Consonants ===
While other Anguthimri dialects and Northern Paman languages have three fricatives, /β ð ɣ/, Mpakwithi has a fourth, /ʒ/. Its origin is uncertain. This is an extremely rare sound in Australian languages.

		Peripheral		Laminal		Apical		Glottal
		Bilabial	Velar	Palatal	Dental	Alveolar/ Retroflex	Post- alveolar	Glottal
Plosives	voiceless	p	k	c	t̪	t	t̠ʳ	ʔ
Plosives	prenasal	ᵐb	ᵑɡ	ᶮɟ	ⁿ̪d̪	ⁿd	ⁿd̠ʳ	
Fricatives	voiced	β	ɣ	ʒ	ð			
Fricatives	voiceless			(ʃ)		(s)		
Nasals		m	ŋ	ɲ	n̪	n		
Rhotics						ɻ	ɾ	
Approximants		w		j		l		

The flap /ɾ/ may occasionally also be heard as a trill [r].

Sounds [s, ʃ] may also occur, but only rarely and in a small amount of words. The phonemic status is uncertain.
