= Anguthimri language =

Extinct Australian Aboriginal language

Anguthimri
- Native to: Australia
- Region: Cape York Peninsula, Queensland
- Ethnicity: Tjungundji, Jupangati (Wimaranga), Winduwinda, etc.
- Extinct: 1980s (Note: Extinction date of individual dialects)
- Language family: Pama–Nyungan: Paman; North Cape York; Northern; Anguthimri
- Dialects: Alngith; Linngithigh; Mpakwithi; Nggerikudi (Yupungati/Yuputhimri); Tjungundji (Yangathimri); Ntra'angith

Language codes
- ISO 639-3: Variously: aid – Alngith lnj – Linngithigh awg – Mpakwithi (Anguthimri proper) tjj – Tjungundji (Yangathimri)
- Glottolog: angu1242
- AIATSIS: Y20 Anguthimri, Y26 Linngithigh, Y19 Yupangathi, Y14 Tjungundji, Y27 Ndra'ngith, Y32 Alnith (plus Awngthim)
- ELP: Tjungundji

Anguthimri (Jupangati, Angadimi) is an extinct Paman language formerly spoken on the Cape York Peninsula of Queensland, Australia, by the Anguthimri people who lived in the area from the mouth of the Mission River north to Pennefather River and west to Duyfken Point. It is unknown when it became extinct.

== Dialects ==
The name Anguthimri is not a synonym of Awngthim, though due to their similarity they have sometimes been confused. There were several groups speaking Anguthimri or similar dialects, including the Tjungundji, Yupungathi, Mpakwithi, and Wimaranga. The Yupungathi language region included the western side of Cape York between Janie Creek and the Pennefather River and Weipa. Tjungundji was traditionally spoken in the region of the Batavia River, Cullen Point, and Janie Creek; and then later, following removals, spoken in the Northern Peninsula Area Region, near New Mapoon, Injinoo, and Cowal Creek communities.

== Phonology ==
=== Vowels ===
Anguthimri vowels
| | | Front | | | Central | | Back |
| | | unrounded | nasal | rounded | plain | nasal | Back |
|---|---|---|---|---|---|---|---|
| Close | short | i | ĩ | y | | | u |
| Close | long | iː | | | | | uː |
| Mid | short | e | ẽ | ø | | | o |
| Mid | long | eː | | | | | |
| Near-open | short | æ | æ̃ | | | | |
| Near-open | long | æː | | | | | |
| Open | short | | | | a | ã | |
| Open | long | | | | aː | | |

Anguthimri is the only Aboriginal language with phonemic nasal vowels.
