= Alngith dialect =

Extinct Australian Aboriginal language

Alngith
- Native to: Australia
- Region: Cape York Peninsula, Queensland
- Ethnicity: Alngith, Winduwinda
- Extinct: 1980s
- Language family: Pama–Nyungan: Paman; North Cape York; Northern; Anguthimri; Alngith

Language codes
- ISO 639-3: aid
- Glottolog: alng1239
- AIATSIS: Y32
- ELP: Alngith

Alngith (al-ngeeth) is an extinct Paman language formerly spoken on the Cape York Peninsula of Queensland, Australia, by the Alngith people. The last known speakers survived into the 1980s. Phonologically, this language variety is very similar to the related variety Linngithigh, the only difference being that this language has the process of metathesis whereas Linngithigh does not.

Alngith is considered to be a dialect of Thaynakwith, a language spoken on Western Cape York in the Weipa area taking in Albatross Bay and Mission River. The traditional language area of Thaynakwith includes landscape within the local government boundaries of Weipa Town Council and the Shire of Cook.

The word Nje 'alan means 'good day'.

== Phonology ==
The two dialects of Alngith and Linngithigh have the same sound inventory.

=== Consonants ===
	Peripheral		Laminal		Apical		Glottal
	Bilabial	Velar	Palatal	Dental	Alveolar	Retroflex	Glottal
Plosives	p	k	c	t̪	t		ʔ
Fricatives	β	ɣ		ð			
Nasals	m	ŋ	ɲ	n̪	n		
Post-trilled					tʳ		
Vibrant					r		
Approximants	w		j		l	ɻ	

=== Vowels ===
	Front	Back
High	i	u
Mid	æ	o
Low	a	
