= Awngthim language =

Extinct Australian Aboriginal language

Awngthim
- Awngthim
- Pronunciation: [aŋθim] or [aŋθem]
- Native to: Australia
- Region: Cape York Peninsula, Queensland
- Ethnicity: Winduwinda
- Extinct: c. 1980s
- Revival: 0
- Language family: Pama–Nyungan: Paman; North Cape York; Northern; Anguthimri?; Awngthim
- Dialects: Mamngayt (Mamangathi); Ntrwa'ngayth (Ndraangidh, Ndrwa’ngathi); Thyanngayth

Language codes
- ISO 639-3: gwm
- Glottolog: awng1245
- AIATSIS: Y185 Awngthim (cover term), Y31 Mamngayt, Y27 Ntrwa'angayth, Y24 Thyanngayth
- ELP: Awngthim

Awngthim is an extinct Australian Aboriginal language formerly spoken in Cape York in Queensland, Australia by the Winduwinda people. The Awngthim language region includes the areas around Weipa and the Cook Shire.

== Name ==
The name Awngthim is not a synonym of Anguthimri, though due to their similarity they have sometimes been confused.

== Dialects ==
Hale (1964) treats Awngthim as a cover term for dialects Ntrwa'ngayth /ntʳwaʔŋajt̪/, Thyanhngayth /t̪jan̪ŋajt̪/, and Mamngayth /mamŋajt̪/. -Ngayth is a suffix common to many tribal names of the area. These are the Ntrwa'a, Thyanh, and Mam dialects.

The Ndrangith and Ndra'ngith languages have been confused with Ntrwa'ngayth.

== Phonology ==
Consonant phonemes
	Peripheral		Laminal		Apical	Glottal
	Bilabial	Velar	Palatal	Dental	Alveolar	Glottal
Plosive	p	k	c	t̪	t	ʔ
Fricative	β	ɣ		ð		
Nasal	m	ŋ	ɲ	n̪	n	
Lateral					l	
Post-trilled					tʳ	
Vibrant					r	
Approximant	w		j		ɹ	

Vowel phonemes
	Front	Central	Back
High	i		u
Mid	e	ə	
Low	a		

== See also ==
- Ndra'ngith language, identified in Donohue (1991) as being the same as the Ntrwa'ngayth dialect, but seen as distinct by Sutton (2001)
