= Leonard Weinglass =

American criminal defense attorney and constitutional law advocate

- Born: Leonard Irving Weinglass; August 27, 1933; Belleville, New Jersey, U.S.
- Died: March 23, 2011 (aged 77); New York City, New York, U.S.
- Education: George Washington University (BA); Yale University (LLB)

Leonard Irving Weinglass (August 27, 1933 – March 23, 2011) was a U.S. criminal defense lawyer and constitutional law advocate, best known for his defense of participants in the 1960s counterculture. He was admitted to the bar in New Jersey, New York, Connecticut and California. He taught criminal trial advocacy at the University of Southern California Law School from 1974 to 1976, and at the Peoples College of Law, in Los Angeles, California from 1974 to 1975.

== Early life ==
Leonard Weinglass was born on August 27, 1933, to a Jewish family in Belleville, New Jersey. He graduated from Yale Law School in 1958, then served as a captain judge advocate in the United States Air Force from 1959 to 1961.

== Career ==
Weinglass championed a number of liberal and radical causes during the counterculture era. An expert in constitutional law, he served as co-chairman of the international committee of the National Lawyers Guild. Along with attorney William Kunstler, Weinglass represented the Chicago 7 in their 1969 trial. He also participated in the defense of Daniel Ellsberg and Anthony Russo, who were charged with leaking the Pentagon Papers and whose trial ended in a dismissal of all charges. In 1970, he represented and won the acquittal of Angela Davis who was charged with participation in the abduction and murder of a California judge.

Other prominent clients included Kathy Boudin, a member of the Weather Underground charged with felony murder for her participation in an armed robbery; anti-war activist Ron Kaufman; Bill and Emily Harris (of the SLA), wrongfully convicted Korean-American Chol Soo Lee, and Jimi Simmons, among others. He was the lead defense attorney for Mumia Abu-Jamal for several years. In 1995, he authored a book about Abu-Jamal's case entitled Race for Justice: Mumia Abu Jamal's Fight Against the Death Penalty.

In 1972, Weinglass took on the defense of John Sinclair, Chairman of the White Panther Party in Detroit, Michigan. The case became United States v. U.S. District Court, 407 U.S. 297 (1972) on appeal to the United States Supreme Court, a landmark decision prohibiting the government's use of electronic surveillance without a warrant.

Weinglass defended Kathy Boudin in the 1981 Brink's robbery.

In 1985, Weinglass successfully defended Stephen Bingham, an attorney accused of smuggling a handgun to George Jackson in San Quentin Prison setting off an escape attempt that resulted in the death of Jackson, two other inmates, and three prison guards.

Weinglass was the lead appellate attorney for the Cuban Five from 2002 until his death in 2011.

== Last years ==
Up until the last year of his life, Weinglass continued to take on cases. He saw no reason to stop: "the typical call I get is the one that starts by saying 'You are the fifth attorney we've called'. Then I get interested."

== Death ==
Leonard Weinglass died on March 23, 2011, aged 77, from pancreatic cancer, in New York City.

== Popular culture ==
- Elliott Gould played Weinglass in the 1987 film Conspiracy: The Trial of the Chicago 8
- Weinglass voiced himself in the 2007 animated documentary Chicago 10
- Weinglass was portrayed by Ben Shenkman in the 2020 drama film The Trial of the Chicago 7

== Awards ==
- 1974: First recipient of the Clarence Darrow Award
- 1980: Humanitarian Award for 1980 of the First Unitarian Church of Los Angeles
- 1994: Outstanding Achievement Award (California Attorneys for Criminal Justice)
- 1996 Firecracker Alternative Book Award for Politics for Race for Justice: Mumia Abu-Jamal's Fight Against the Death Penalty
