= The Laughing Dogs =

American rock band

- Origin: New York, New York, U.S.
- Genre: Rock
- Years active: 1974–1992; 2008
- Labels: Atlantic Records, Columbia Records, Molehill, Laughing Bear, Molehill Records, Rhino Atlantic, CBS
- Past members: Ronny Carle; James Leonard; Carter Cathcart; Skip Reed; Moe Potts
- Website: www.thelaughingdogs.com

The Laughing Dogs were an American rock band, active in the 1970s and associated with the rock/punk scene of New York's CBGB. They released two albums on Columbia.

== History ==
The Laughing Dogs first became popular in the New York underground music scene at CBGB in 1974. They released two albums on Columbia Records, The Laughing Dogs and The Laughing Dogs Meet Their Makers (both reissued in 2009 on American Beat Records), and several indie CDs, besides three singles, "Get ‘Im Outta Town", "Reason for Love", and "Johnny Contender".

They toured extensively with the Patti Smith Group, Cheap Trick, and Blondie. "Get Outta My Way" is in the soundtrack of the 2013 film CBGB.

An interesting coincidence is that the first The Laughing Dogs album from 1979 re-used the cover for the unreleased debut album from the band Wicked Lester, that later morphed into Kiss. Ten years later, The Laughing Dogs member Carter Cathcart co-wrote a song ("Remember Me") with Kiss member Ace Frehley on his solo album Trouble Walkin'.

== Band members ==
- Ronny Carle (a.k.a. Ronny Altaville) – bass, harmonica, vocals
- James Leonard (a.k.a. Jimmi Accardi) – guitar, vocals
- Carter Cathcart (a.k.a. James Carter Cathcart) – guitar, keyboards, vocals
- Skip Reed (a.k.a. Paul Reed) – drums
- Moe Potts (a.k.a. Marc Potocsky) – drums

== Discography ==
- The Laughing Dogs (Columbia, 1979)
- The Laughing Dogs Meet Their Makers (Columbia, 1980)
- Live at CBGB's: The Home of Underground Rock (1976) – two songs by The Laughing Dogs, later released as a CD on Atlantic Records
- Punky But Chic . . . The American New Wave Scene (Sony)
- The Long Lost Night (live in NYC; Laughing Bear Records, 1992)
- Great Italian Love Songs of the '50s – (Molehill, 1992)
- Hidden Bones – (unreleased 1970s songs; Molehill)
- When Do We Eat? – Molehill
- The Laughing Dogs Live at The Village Underground (DVD) – Molehill
- CBGB: Original Motion Picture Soundtrack – Omnivore Recordings
