= Mbiywom language =

Extinct Australian Aboriginal language

Mbiywom
- Mbeiwum
- Native to: Australia
- Region: Cape York Peninsula, Queensland
- Ethnicity: Mbewum
- Extinct: (date missing)
- Language family: Pama–Nyungan: Paman; North Cape York; Northern; Mbiywom

Language codes
- ISO 639-3: None (mis)
- Glottolog: mbiy1238
- AIATSIS: Y41
- ELP: Mbiywom

Mbiywom (Mbeiwum) is an extinct Australian Aboriginal language formerly spoken by the Mbiywom people around the areas of Cape York and Cook Shire in Far North Queensland.

== Alternative names ==
- Bywoom
- Kok Mbewam / KokMbewam / KokMbewan
- Kokimoh / Kokinno
- M Berwum
- Mbe:wum / Mbeiwum / Mbewum
- Uradhi

== Phonology ==
=== Consonants ===
		Peripheral		Laminal		Apical	
		Bilabial	Velar	Palatal	Dental	Alveolar	Retroflex
Plosive	voiceless	p	k	c	t̪	t	
Plosive	voiced	b	ɡ	ɟ	d̪	d	
Fricative		β	ɣ		ð		
Nasal		m	ŋ	ɲ	n̪	n	
Rhotic						r	
Approximant		w		j		l	ɻ

=== Vowels ===
	Front		Back
High	i	y	u
Mid	e		o
Low	a		
