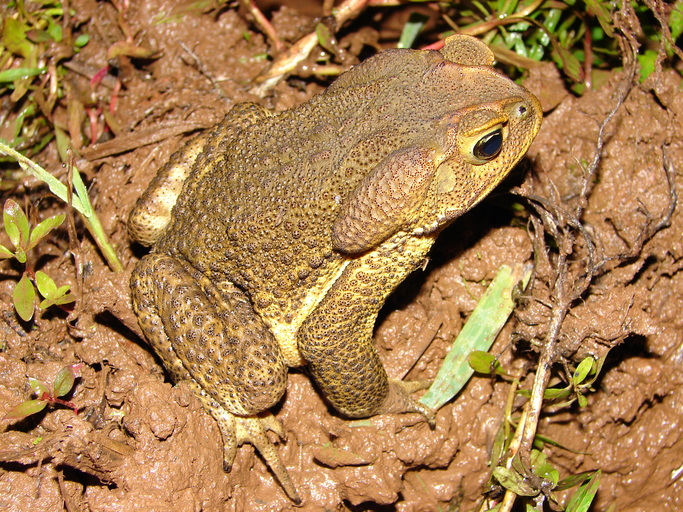
- Adult male R. icterica
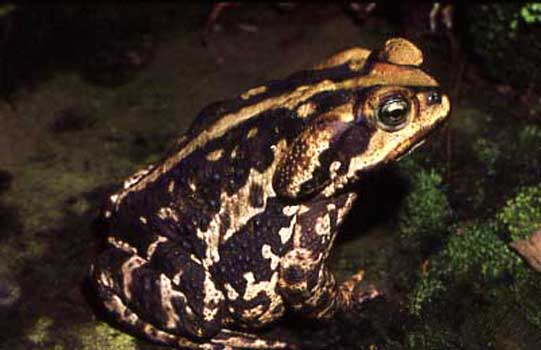
- Adult female R. icterica

Conservation status
- Least Concern (IUCN 3.1)

Scientific classification
- Kingdom: Animalia
- Phylum: Chordata
- Class: Amphibia
- Order: Anura
- Family: Bufonidae
- Genus: Rhinella
- Species: R. icterica

Binomial name
- Rhinella icterica (Spix, 1824)
- Range in green

Synonyms
- Bufo ictericus Spix, 1824; Rhinella ictericus (Spix, 1824)

= Rhinella icterica =

Species of amphibian

Rhinella icterica (common name: yellow cururu toad) is a species of toad in the family Bufonidae that is found in northeastern Argentina (Misiones Province), southern Brazil, and eastern Paraguay. "Cururu" is its indigenous name and refers to the male advertisement call that is a melodious tremolo. "Cururu toad", without the specifier "yellow", is a common name used for a few other closely related species.

== Description ==
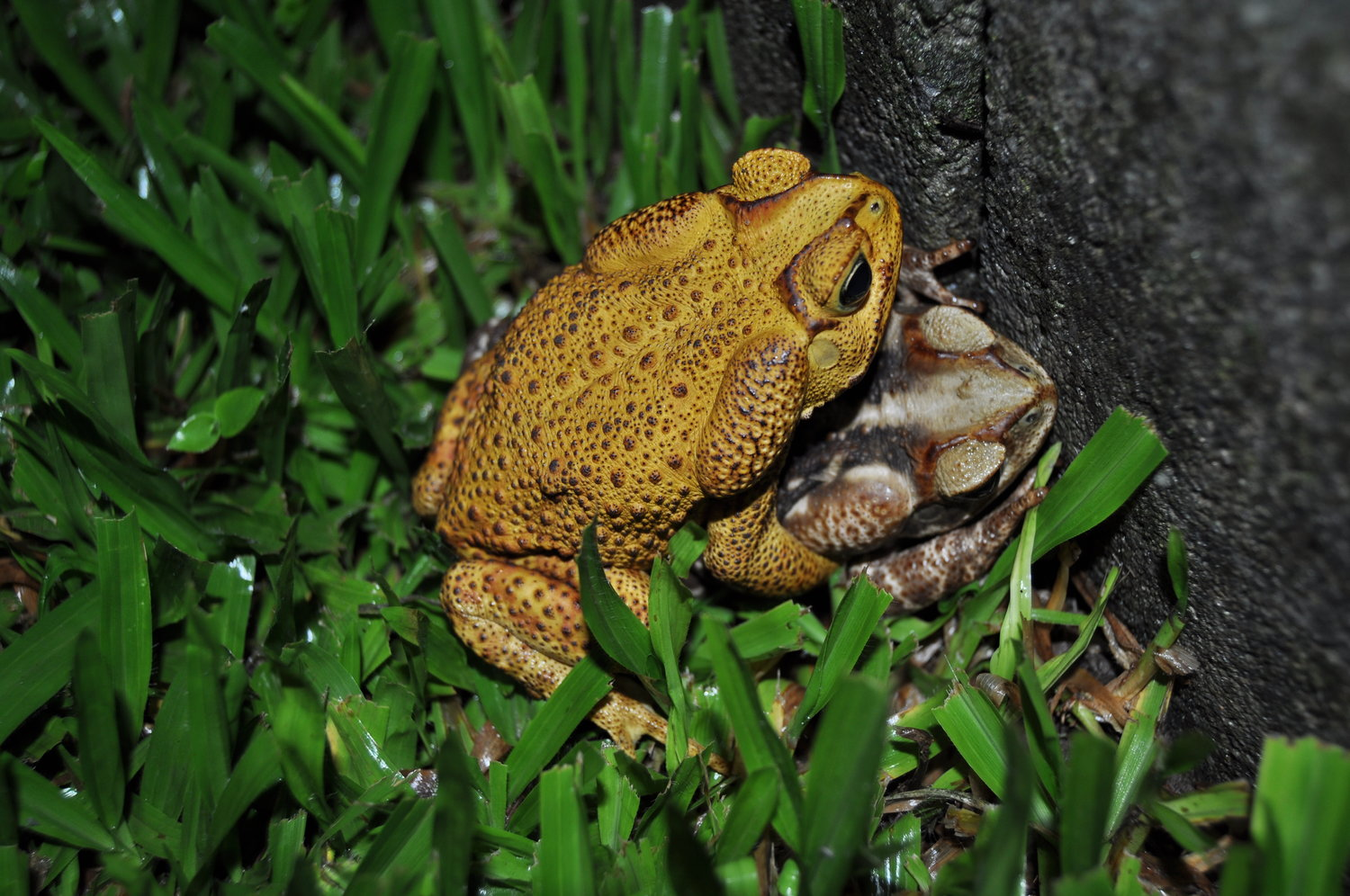
Pair in amplexus, showing the differences between the sexes

Rhinella icterica is relatively large, stout-bodied toads. Males measure 100–166 mm (3.9–6.5 in) and females 135–190 mm (5.3–7.5 in) in snout–vent length. The parotoid glands are strong, as are the cephalic crests. The dorsum is yellowish in females and juveniles, with a light midline stripe and a regular pattern of black blotches; in the males the colouration is often a bright greenish yellow, with only a few black blotches. The belly is white and marbled with brown. The skin is scattered with blunt, thorny warts, especially in the males. Rhinella icterica is the most common toad species found in southeastern Brazil and preys on the yellow scorpion (Tityus serrulatus). It has been observed that Rhinella icterica possess the ability to eat scorpions without adverse effects on the toad. This may be due to Rhinella icterica toxic secretion (RITS) that ultimately acts as a concentration independent irreversible neuromuscular blockade. In the presence of the acetylcholinesterase enzyme there was inhibition of Rhinella icterica toxic secretion. Additionally, RITS acts as an inhibitor on the cardiac Na+, K+-ATPase pump. Scientists have concluded that the toxic secretion from the toad acts as an inhibitor of calcium pumps in the heart causing a twitching action, AChE, and Na+, K+-ATPase pump. This toad species has been found to possess a defense mechanism against predators. There are cutaneous glands that are scattered all over the body of amphibians that aide in respirating, water balance, and chemical defense. There are 2 types of glands: mucous and poisonous. The poisonous glands involved in the defense mechanism are called granular glands. They form glandular accommodations in the dorsal region behind the eyes, one on each side of the body. These are called the paranoid macroglands. When they are threatened, they inflate up their lungs and point one of the glands at the attacker. This opens one of the glands to attack. When this region is pressed upon, poison is rapidly released. If bitten, the poison is shot into the predator's oral cavity mucosa, thus poisoning them.

== Specialized cells ==
Rhinella icterica possess specialized cells found among the glandular cells in mucous layer of the esophagus. In addition, the stomach of Rhinella icterica has four distinct layers that shows the same pattern as the esophagus. these specialized cells are called the oxynticopeptic cells and are responsible for the production of hydrochloric acid and pepsinogen Its stomach is made up of a simple epithelium of columnar mucous cells that is supported by well vascularized loose connective tissue. In mammals, the gastric surface is lined by mucus that is secreted by mucous cells. This is also observed in Rhinella icterica. The mucous cells in this toad species also produces neutral glycoproteins that are rich in galactose, galactosamine, and glucosamine residues. This is similar to other toad species whose mucous layer that serves to protect the surface of the stomach and is formed by neutral glycoconjugates.

== Habitat and conservation ==
Rhinella icterica is found in the Atlantic Forest, spanning southeastern and southern Brazil, eastern Paraguay, and in the Misiones and Corrientes provinces of Argentina. When it is time for them to reproduce, thus species is found mainly in streams or ponds in large congregations. They get their food from hanging matter and submerged plants.

This common toad occurs in a large range of habitats, from forests to open habitats such as Cerrado savanna, and including disturbed habitats. Breeding takes place from August to January in permanent and temporary ponds and streams. It is an adaptable species that also occurs in many protected areas, and is not considered threatened. Initially, these toads remained in the forested and less urbanized areas of Brazil. However, due to more recent deforestation and the building of new roads, there has been a decrease in the ability of toads to access water which is necessary for their breeding. Because of this, the population of Rhinella icterica is gradually decreasing, causing an increase in the number of scorpions found in this area.
