= Mbewum =

Aboriginal Australian people

The Mbewum were an indigenous Australian people of the Cape York Peninsula of northern Queensland. They were dispossessed and became extinct soon after colonization.

== Language ==
The Mbewum spoke Mbiywom, a northern Paman language.

== Country ==
The Mbewum had an estimated 600 square miles (1,600 km^{2}) of tribal domain territory on the Upper Watson River, which included Merluna in the area 120 miles south-east of Weipa. Their land, together with that of the Totj was incorporated into a state-run enterprise, the Queensland State Pastoral Station of that name, which by 1916 was running over 12,000 head of cattle.

== Social organization ==
They had four kinship divisions like other tribes in the area, according to R. H. Mathews.

== Alternative names ==
- KokMbewan
- Mbe:wum, Mbeiwum, M-Berwum
- Bywoom
- Kokinno
- Kokimoh

== Sources ==
- "AIATSIS map of Indigenous Australia". AIATSIS. 14 May 2024.
- Cohen, Kay (August 1988). "State Pastoral Stations in Queensland: 1916-30" (PDF). Journal of the Royal Society of Queensland. X111 (7): 229–248.
- Dixon, Robert M. W. (2002). Australian Languages: Their Nature and Development. Vol. 1. Cambridge University Press. ISBN 978-0-521-47378-1.
- Mathews, R. H. (1900). "Some tribes of Cape York Peninsula". Journal and Proceedings of the Royal Society of New South Wales. 34: 131–135.
- May, Dawn (1994). Aboriginal Labour and the Cattle Industry: Queensland from White Settlement to the Present. Cambridge University Press. p. 212. ISBN 978-0-521-46915-9.
- McConnel, Ursula H. (September 1939). "Social Organization of the Tribes of Cape York Peninsula, North Queensland". Oceania. 10 (1): 54–72. doi:10.1002/j.1834-4461.1939.tb00256.x. JSTOR 40327744.
- McConnel, Ursula H. (June 1940). "Social Organization of the Tribes of Cape York Peninsula, North Queensland (Continued)". Oceania. 10 (4): 434–455. doi:10.1002/j.1834-4461.1940.tb00305.x. JSTOR 40327867.
- Tindale, Norman Barnett (1974). "Mbewum (QLD)". Aboriginal Tribes of Australia: Their Terrain, Environmental Controls, Distribution, Limits, and Proper Names. Australian National University. ISBN 978-0-708-10741-6.
