= Ngkoth language =

Extinct Australian Aboriginal language

Ngkoth
- Ŋkot̪
- Pronunciation: [ŋkot̪]
- Native to: Australia
- Region: Cape York Peninsula, Queensland
- Ethnicity: Trotj, Winduwinda
- Extinct: (date missing)
- Language family: Pama–Nyungan: Paman; North Cape York; Northern; Ngkoth
- Dialects: Tootj (Kauwala); Ngaawangati (Ungauwangati)

Language codes
- ISO 639-3: None (mis)
- Glottolog: ngko1236
- AIATSIS: Y36

Ngkoth (Nggɔt, Nggoth, Ŋkot) is an extinct Paman language formerly spoken on the Cape York Peninsula of Queensland, Australia, by the Winduwinda. It is unknown when it became extinct.

== Phonology ==
=== Vowels ===
Ngkoth has seven vowels:

	Front		Back
	Unrounded	Rounded	Rounded
Close	i		u
Close-mid	e	ø	o
Near-open	æ		
Open	a		

=== Consonants ===
Ngkoth has 17 consonants found in native words, and three consonants found only in loanwords:

	Peripheral		Laminal		Apical		Glottal
	Bilabial	Velar	Palatal	Dental	Alveolar	Retroflex	Glottal
Plosive	p	k	c	t̪	t		(ʔ)
Fricatives	(β)	ɣ		(ð)			
Nasal	m	ŋ	ɲ	n̪	n		
Post-trilled					tr̥		
Vibrant					r		
Approximant	w		j		l	ɻ	

/tr̥/ is a trilled affricate.

/β, ð, ʔ/ are only found in loanwords.
