= Adithinngithigh language =

Australian aboriginal language

Adithinngithigh
- Native to: Australia
- Region: Cape York Peninsula, Queensland
- Extinct: 18th-20th century?
- Language family: Pama–Nyungan: Paman; North Cape York; Northern; Adithinngithigh

Language codes
- ISO 639-3: dth
- Glottolog: None
- AIATSIS: Y229
- ELP: Adithinngithigh

Adithinngithigh, or Adetingiti, is an extinct Australian aboriginal language once spoken in Cape York in Queensland.

There has been some confusion over the name:

Given that Aditinngithigh and ‘Arritinngithigh’ seem to have been identified with only one estate each and the names are so similar, it might be tempting to consider their distinct spellings a mere artifact of the recording process, but the names are indeed distinct and moreover the relevant estate are noncontiguous and owned by different people.
