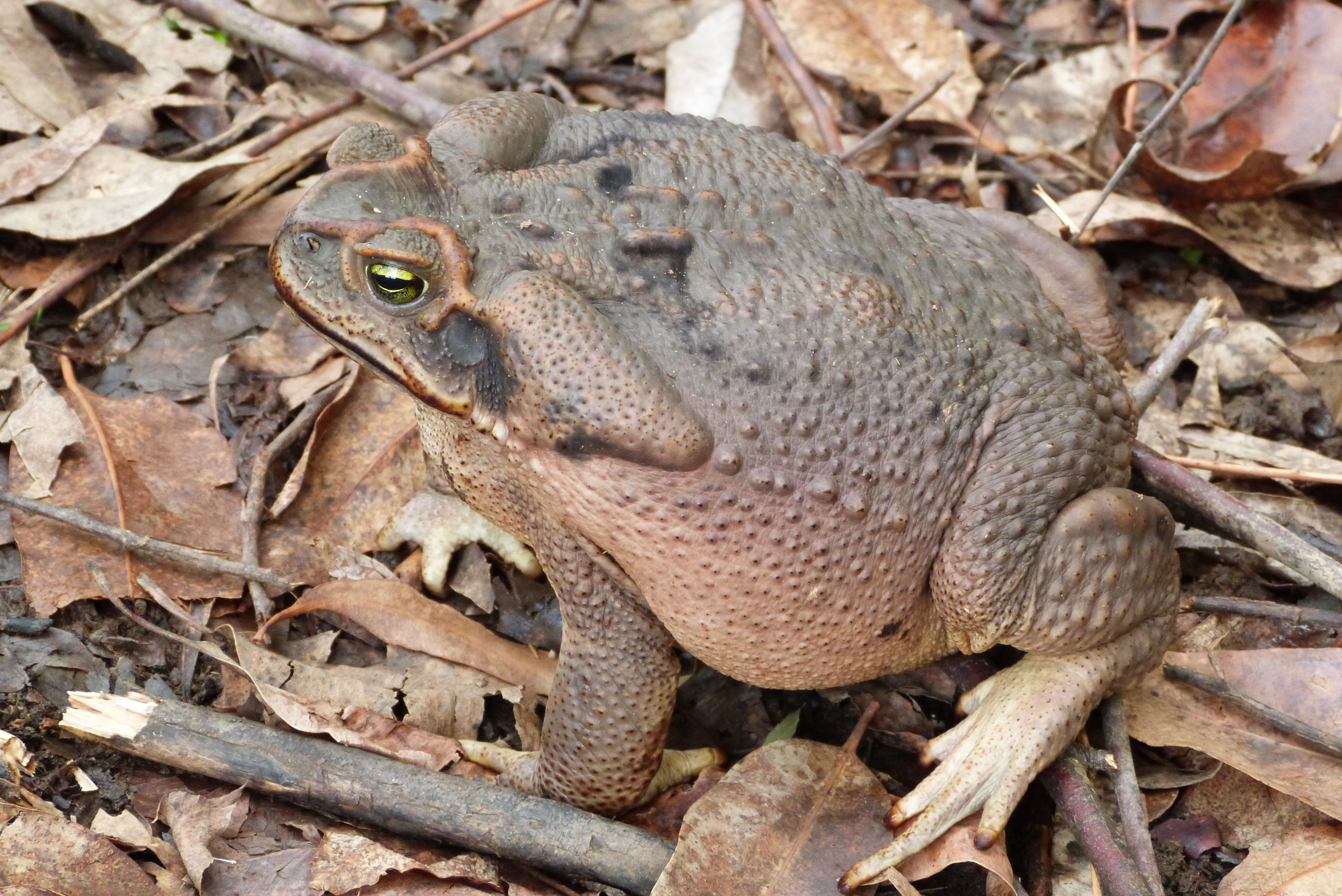

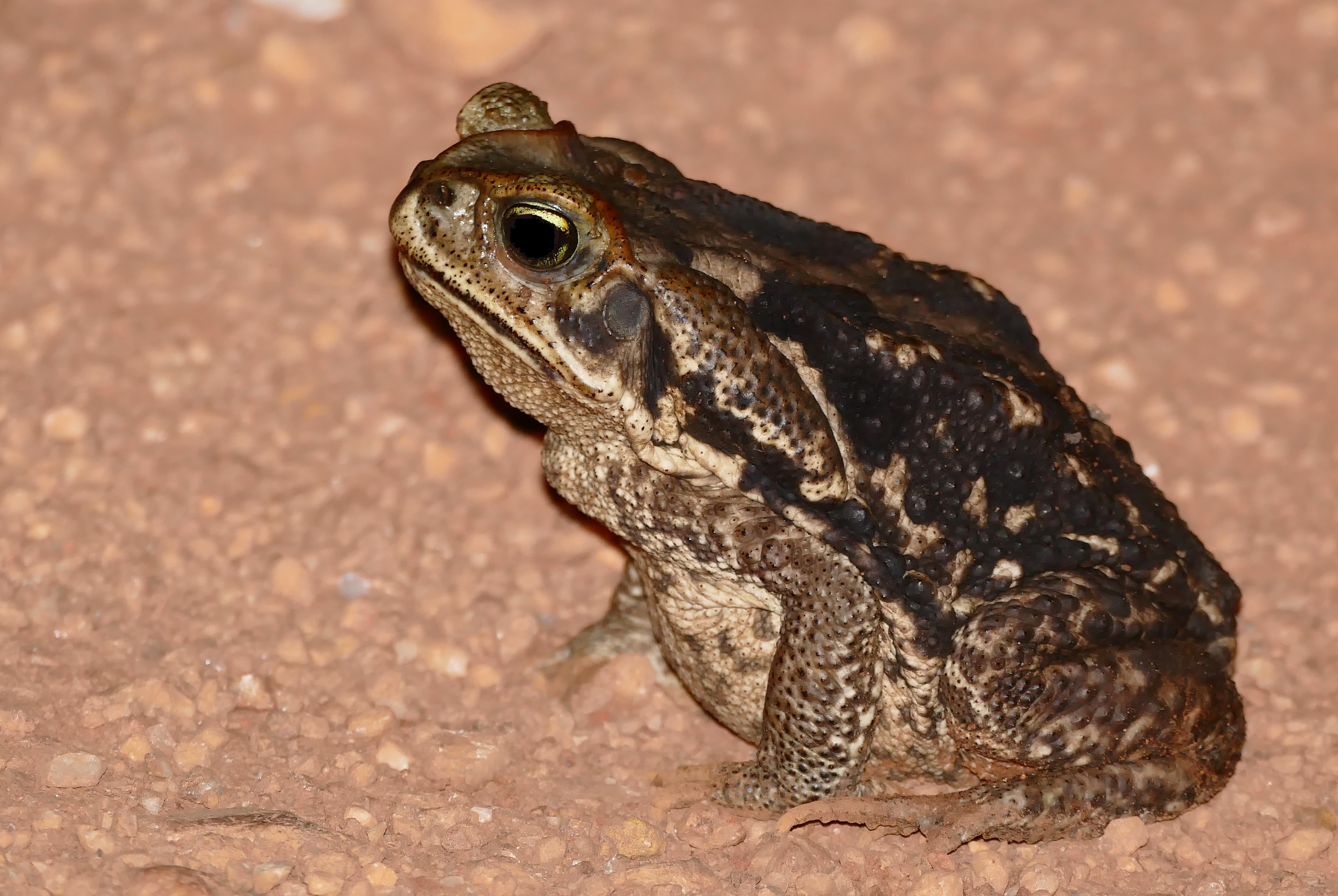
- Two variants showing opposite extremes in the amount of dark markings possible in the species

Conservation status
- Least Concern (IUCN 3.1)

Scientific classification
- Domain: Eukaryota
- Kingdom: Animalia
- Phylum: Chordata
- Class: Amphibia
- Order: Anura
- Family: Bufonidae
- Genus: Rhinella
- Species: R. diptycha

Binomial name
- Rhinella diptycha (Cope, 1862)
- Range in red

Synonyms
- Bufo schneideri Werner, 1894; Chaunus schneideri (Werner, 1894); Bufo paracnemis Lutz, 1925; Rhinella schneideri (Werner, 1894); Bufo diptychus; Rhinella diptychus

= Rhinella diptycha =

Species of amphibian

Rhinella diptycha, sometimes referred to as Cope's toad, Schneider's toad, cururu toad, or rococo toad, is a toad found in northern Argentina, Paraguay, Uruguay, eastern Bolivia, and eastern and southern Brazil.

== Classification ==
It is one of three rather similar species sometimes referred to as "cururu toads" in Brazil, the others being R. jimi and R. marina (cane toad). Like those, R. diptycha is a large toad, females up to 25 cm (9.8 in) in snout–to–vent length and males up to 18 cm (7.1 in).

Rhinella diptycha is a widespread and very common species that occurs in a variety of habitats but most commonly in open and urban ones. It breeds in permanent and temporary ponds, preferring ones without much vegetation. Its natural habitats include dry savanna, freshwater marshes, and intermittent freshwater marshes. It is threatened by habitat loss. It is sometimes kept as a pet, but pet trade is not occurring at levels that would constitute a threat.
