= Jean Jimmy =

Australian politician

- Born: Andruana Ann Jean Jimmy; 30 September 1912
- Died: 17 October 1991 (aged 79)
- Occupations: Aboriginal activist and politician

Andruana Ann Jean Jimmy (30 September 1912 – 17 October 1991) was an Aboriginal Australian activist and politician known for campaigning against the closure of the aboriginal Mapoon Reserve and her subsequent forced removal.

== Biography ==
Jimmy was born on 30 September 1912 near the Pennefather River in Far North Queensland, Australia. She was the second of three children; her brother was Richard (1898–?), also known as Dick Luff, and her sister was Maggie (1910–?). Both her parents were of Wimaranga ancestry and her name, Andruana, meant wattle in their native language, signifying feminine resolve. She spent most of her formative years in a Presbyterian lodging in Mapoon, rarely seeing her father, Philip, who was an evangelist for aboriginal people. On 29 August 1933, she married sailor Gilbert Jimmy; they relocated to Thursday Island after World War II. She later protested the leasing of a significant area of the Mapoon Reserve to mining, before being forcibly removed along with other fellow Aboriginal people to New Mapoon, Queensland. She revealed her experiences to the 1964 Federal Council for the Advancement of Aborigines and Torres Strait Islanders Conference. She later served as the leader of the local council for two years, before moving to Weipa South, where she served as leader of the local council for three years. Jimmy also provided Les Hiddins with medicinal information that her mother had taught her. She died on 17 October 1991 at Weipa Hospital and was buried in the Mapoon cemetery. A Land and Sea Centre in Mapoon was posthumously named after her.
