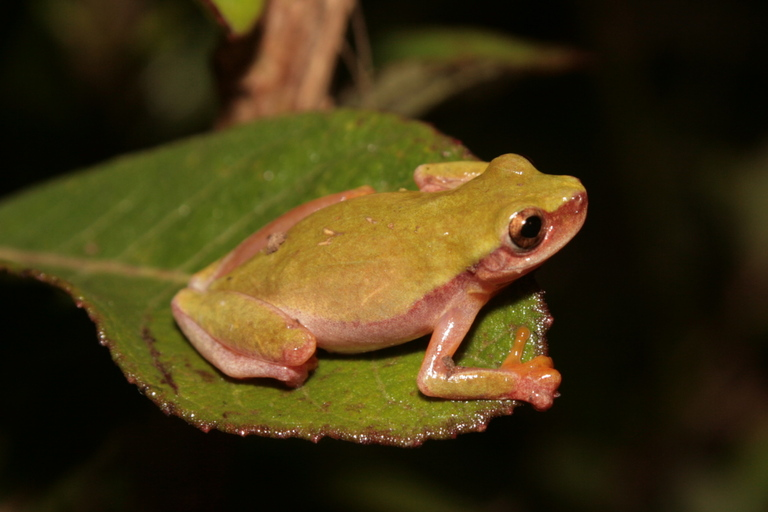

Conservation status
- Least Concern (IUCN 3.1)

Scientific classification
- Kingdom: Animalia
- Phylum: Chordata
- Class: Amphibia
- Order: Anura
- Family: Hylidae
- Genus: Dendropsophus
- Species: D. elianeae

Binomial name
- Dendropsophus elianeae (Napoli & Caramaschi, 2000)

= Dendropsophus elianeae =

Species of frog

Dendropsophus elianeae is a species of frog in the family Hylidae. It is found in Brazil and possibly Paraguay. Its natural habitats are moist savanna, subtropical or tropical moist shrubland, freshwater marshes, and intermittent freshwater marshes. It is threatened by habitat loss.
