= Jimmie =

Jimmie is a variation of the given name James.

Jimmie may refer to:

== Men ==
- Jimmie Adams (1888–1933), American silent film comedian
- Jimmie Åkesson (born 1979), Swedish politician
- Jimmie Allen (born 1986), American country music singer
- Jimmie Angel (1899–1956), American aviator for whom Angel Falls is named
- Jimmie Davis (1899–2000), singer and two-time Governor of Louisiana
- Jimmie Dodd (1910–1964), master of ceremonies of the television show The Mickey Mouse Club
- Jimmie Fidler (1900–1988), American columnist, journalist, and radio and television personality
- Jimmie Foxx (1907–1967), Hall of Fame Major League Baseball player
- Jimmie Guthrie (1897–1937), Scottish motorcycle racer
- Jimmie Hall (born 1938), Major League Baseball player
- Jimmie Heuga (1943–2010), one of the first two American men alpine skiers to win an Olympic medal
- Jimmie Johnson (born 1975), American race car driver
- Jimmie Lunceford (1902–1947), American jazz musician and bandleader
- Jimmie Mattern (1905–1988), American aviator
- Jimmie W. Monteith (1917–1944), US Army officer posthumously awarded the Medal of Honor
- Jimmie Nicol (born 1939), temporary replacement drummer with The Beatles
- Jimmie Noone (1895–1944), American jazz clarinetist
- Jimmie Reese (1901–1994), American Major League Baseball player
- Jimmie Rivera (born 1989), American mixed martial artist
- Jimmie Rodgers (country singer) (1897–1933), American singer
- Jimmie Spheeris (1949–1984), American singer and songwriter
- Jimmie Lee Solomon (1956–2020), American lawyer and Major League Baseball executive
- Jimmie Walker (born 1947), American actor and stand-up comedian, star of the television show Good Times
- Jimmie Wilson (1900–1947), American Major League Baseball player and manager, and soccer player

== Women ==
- Jimmie Lou Fisher (1941–2022), American politician
- Jimmie C. Holland (1928–2017), American psychiatrist
- Jimmie O. Keenan, Major General of the United States Army
- Jimmie Gibbs Munroe (born 1952), American barrel racer
- Jimmie Carole Fife Stewart (born 1940), American art educator, fashion designer, and artist

== Arts and culture ==
- The Chant of Jimmie Blacksmith, a 1972 novel by Thomas Keneally
- The Chant of Jimmie Blacksmith, a 1978 Australian film directed by Fred Schepisi

== Fictional characters ==
- Jimmie Dimmick, a character in Pulp Fiction
- Jimmie Blacksmith, the main protagonist in the 1978 film The Chant of Jimmie Blacksmith

== See also ==
- James (disambiguation)
- Jim (disambiguation)
- Jimbo (disambiguation)
- Jimmi
- Jimmy (disambiguation)
- Jimi (disambiguation)
