= Jimmy legs =

The term jimmy legs may refer to one of the following:

- Naval slang for the chief petty officer aboard a man-of-war, Master at arms
- Periodic limb movement disorder, the involuntary movement of limbs during sleep
- Restless legs syndrome, an urge to move one's limbs to alleviate uncomfortable sensations
