= Wimaranga =

Indigenous Australian people

The Wimaranga (Wimaragga), also known as the Yuupngati (Jupangati) or Nggerikudi, were an Indigenous Australian people of the western Cape York Peninsula in northern Queensland.

== Language ==
Apart from the oral Jupangati language, the Jupangati employed a version of Australian sign language, and Walter Roth recorded some 24 examples in 1900.

== Country ==
The Jupangati dwelt over 500 square miles (1,300 km^{2}) of land south of the Wenlock, formerly Batavia, River on the Gulf of Carpentaria coast. Their territory extended as far as Duyfken Point and included the Pennefather River district between Port Musgrave and Albatross Bay. To their south were the neighbouring Windawinda people.

== Alternative names ==
There are in the ethnographic literature many names, or spelling variants, used to designate the Jupangati

- Yuupngati, Yupangati, Yupungati
- Yupnget, Yupungatti, Yopngadi
- Nggerikudi, Nggirikudi, Ngerikudi, Niggerikudi
- Ra:kudi
- Angadimi, Angutimi (These refer to the name used to refer to the language.)
- Batjana, Mbatyana, Ba:tyana (This was a name designating a horde on the lower Wenlock [Batavia] River.)
- Wimarangga, Wimaranga (This referred to a horde near Duifken Point, on the north side of Albatross Bay.)

== Sources ==
- Hey, Nicholas (1903). Roth, Walter Edmund (ed.). An elementary grammar of the Nggerikudi language (PDF). Brisbane: G.A. Vaughan.
- Kendon, Adam (1988). Sign Languages of Aboriginal Australia: Cultural, Semiotic and Communicative Perspectives. Cambridge University Press. ISBN 978-0-521-36008-1.
- Tindale, Norman Barnett (1974). "Jupangati (QLD)". Aboriginal Tribes of Australia: Their Terrain, Environmental Controls, Distribution, Limits, and Proper Names. Australian National University Press. ISBN 978-0-708-10741-6.
