= Jimmy Jazz =

Jimmy Jazz may refer to:

- "Jimmy Jazz", a song by The Clash from their 1979 album London Calling
- Jimmy Jazz Records, a Polish record label with bands such as The Analogs, WC and Karcer
- Jimmy Jazz, a 1982 movie starring Fabrice Luchini
- "Jimmy Jazz", a song by Kortatu from their 1985 album Kortatu
- Jimmy Jazz, a footwear and apparel retailer based in the United States
- "Jimmy Jazz", a concert hall in Vitoria, Spain.
