= Jimmi Saputra =

Indonesian businessman

- Born: December 2, 1972 (age 52); Jakarta, Indonesia
- Occupation(s): Technology entrepreneur, businessman

Jimmi Saputra (born December 2, 1972, in Jakarta) is an Indonesian technology businessman. He is the founder and CEO of Tiga Digital Token, an Indonesian company that operates a cryptocurrency exchange platform. The company launched a NFT gaming service, which expands on its first project NEFTiPEDiA, a NFT marketplace for creators. Saputra is the founder of DOOiT, an e-wallet platform in Bali, where he is the CEO.

Saputra is also an advisor to the State Defense Forum, which falls under the Defense Ministry. He was co-founder and chief commercial officer at KOKi Teknologi Indonesia until May 2019. He has founded several companies in field of hospitality and tourism in Bali.
