= Jimmy Jimmy (band) =

English pop band

Jimmy Jimmy was an English short-lived pop band from Coventry, England, during the mid-1980s. They released one LP entitled Here in the Light in 1986 on CBS Records and a few singles including "I Met Her in Paris" and "Silence", which was a number 1 hit in Japan. The band members were James O'Neill and Jimmy Kemp.

The duo are still active today.

== Discography ==
=== Albums ===
- Here in the Light (1986), Epic/CBS

=== Singles ===
- "Love" (1985), Epic
- "I Met Her in Paris" (1985), Epic
- "Silence" (1985), Epic
