= Jimi Simmons =

American accused of murder

Jimi "Dexter" Simmons was a Muckleshoot/Rogue River Indian man who was accused of killing a prison guard in Walla Walla Penitentiary, Washington, United States, in 1979. Jimi and his brother George Simmons were charged with the death penalty. Jimi's defense attorneys were Leonard Weinglass and John Wolfe.

George Simmons was found guilty of second degree murder in 1980. He killed himself in his prison cell in 1981. Jimi Simmons was tried in 1981 after spending two and a half years in solitary confinement. Originally the judge ordered that he would be shackled during his trial. This raised the spectre of Bobby Seale's treatment during the Chicago 7 (8) trial, where Leonard Weinglass had been one of the defense attorneys. The shackling issue was appealed by the defense and went all the way to the Washington State Supreme Court (Simmons vs The People of the State of Washington).

Jimi Simmons was acquitted in December, 1981. He was released from prison in 1983. A documentary film has been made of his life and trial titled Making the River. Making the River was directed by Sarah Del Seronde and produced by Paul Stoll.

Simmons died April 13, 2011, of a stroke.

== Sources ==
- Los Altos Town Crier, April 9, 2008

Vol. 62 No. 15, page 1,6,7,10; "A Path to Redemption"

- The State of Washington v James Simmons

Washington Supreme Court, 1981

- http://www.makingtheriver.com
- https://web.archive.org/web/20080919155815/http://www.aboriginallens.com/
