= Jimmy Hallybone =

English footballer

Personal information
- Full name: James Michael Hallybone
- Date of birth: 15 March 1962 (age 64)
- Place of birth: Leytonstone, England
- Position: Midfielder

Senior career*
Years	Team	Apps	(Gls)
1980–1982	Orient	8	(0)
1982–1983	Halifax Town	16	(0)
1983–1984	Dagenham	10	(1)
1984–1985	Dartford	2	(0)
- * Club domestic league appearances and goals

James Michael Hallybone (born 15 March 1962) is an English former professional footballer who played in the Football League as a midfielder.
