= Linngithigh dialect =

Extinct Paman language of Australia

Linngithigh
- Liningitij
- Native to: Australia
- Region: Cape York Peninsula, Queensland
- Ethnicity: Linngithigh, Winduwinda
- Extinct: "several years" before 1983
- Language family: Pama–Nyungan: Paman; North Cape York; Northern; Anguthimri; Linngithigh

Language codes
- ISO 639-3: lnj
- Glottolog: leni1238
- AIATSIS: Y26
- ELP: Linngithigh

Linngithigh (Liningitij) is an extinct Paman language formerly spoken on the Cape York Peninsula of Queensland, Australia, by the Linngithigh people. It is very similar phonologically to the closely related Alngith.
