= Winduwinda =

Indigenous Australian people of Queensland

The Winduwinda were an indigenous Australian people of Queensland.

== Name ==
The name Winduwinda, like that of the Wik-Munkan, is used to refer to either to a single tribe or an aggregation of approximately 12 tribes. (Note: 'North of the Wik-folk are those who use the suffix -ngit to differentiate between their local groupings. Their southern bounds are at the Archer River and their territories extend north to Albatross Bay and to about 10 miles (16 km) north of the Mission River. There is only one coastal tier of twelve groups using the -ngit suffix. It has been suggested that all the -ngit "tribes" have associations with the name Winduwinda, which in one view would be the tribal name for all twelve of the -ngit groups. For the purposes of the Catalog of Tribes, they are listed together under this name.' (Tindale 1974, p. 113))

== Languages ==
Languages named after Winduwinda creak are

- Awngthim (Mamangit/Mamangidigh/Mamangathi), including Ntrwa'ngayth (Ndraangit) and Thaynakwith (Tanikuit) dialects
- Anguthimri, specifically Alngith (Alingit), Linngithigh (Lenginiti), Ntra'ngith (Ndwangit) dialects
- Ngkoth (Nggot), including Ungawangadi (Ngawangati)
- Arritinngithigh, specifically Ladamngid (Latamngit) dialect
- Mpalitjanh (Mbalidjan), perhaps a dialect of Luthigh
- Ndorndorin, unattested but possibly a Wik language

== Country ==
According to Norman Tindale, the Winduwinda's tribal territory covered some 1,100 square miles (2,800 km^{2}) in the area east of Duyfken Point over to the Archer River. Their inland extension reached to the headwaters of the Embley River.

== Social organization ==
How one defines the social structure of the Winduwinda depends on whether one takes Winduwinda to refer to one tribe composed of hordes, or whether several of these bands were actually distinct tribes. Tindale mentions only two hordes for the Winduwinda in a strict sense, namely:

- Mbalidjan
- (?)Ndorndorin

He then outlines the twelve hordes or tribes - the distinction is unclear - associated with the Winduwinda:

- (1) Tanikuit (Tainikudi, Tani-kutti, Dainiguid, Tanna-gootee). Locality: on the northern side of Albatross Bay.
- (2) Ndruangit. On the northern side of Mission River.
- (3) Ndwangit (Ndwongit). Northern side of Mission River.
- (4) Ngawangati (Ngawataingeti, Ungauwangati). Lower Mission River.
- (5) Alingit (Lengiti, Lenngiti, Alngid, Limretti [?]). Includes Weipa and the area to east of it.
- (6) Mamangit. (Mamangiti, Mamngaid). South side of Albatross Bay.
- (7) Latamngit (Lätamngit). West bank of the Hay River.
- (8) Nggot (Gott). The southern side of the Embley River.
- (9) Aretinget (Aretingit, Aritingiti, Adetingiti). The upper Hay River, and across to Pera Head.
- (10)Ndraangit (different locality to Ndruangit). Coast near False Pera Head.
- (11) Leningiti (Laini-ngitti, not the same as "Lengiti" of Weipa, Leningit). The area west of the lower Watson River and also Aurukun.
- (12) Anjingit (Andjingit, Anyingit, Anjingat, Andyingati? Anangit). On the west coast just to the north of the Archer River.

== Alternative names ==
- Mbalidjan
- Ndorndorin
- Ngwatainggeti
- Wikwija (Wik-Munkan exonym signifying 'bad speech')
- Windawinda

Source: Tindale 1974, p. 190

== Sources ==
- Tindale, Norman Barnett (1974). "Winduwinda (QLD)". Aboriginal Tribes of Australia: Their Terrain, Environmental Controls, Distribution, Limits, and Proper Names. Australian National University Press. ISBN 978-0-708-10741-6.
- Y26 Linngithigh at the Australian Indigenous Languages Database, Australian Institute of Aboriginal and Torres Strait Islander Studies
