= Ndrangith language =

Extinct Australian Aboriginal language

Ndrangith
- (unattested)
- Native to: Australia
- Region: Cape York Peninsula, Queensland
- Extinct: (date missing)
- Language family: Pama-Nyungan: Paman; Northern; Ndrangith

Language codes
- ISO 639-3: None (mis)
- Glottolog: None
- AIATSIS: Y202

Ndrangith (Ndrrangith) is a presumed Australian language once spoken in the Cape York Peninsula of Queensland. It is undocumented, without even word lists to record it.

Sutton (2001) says the name is distinct from the similar-sounding Ndra'ngith language and Ndwa'ngith language, and places it in the Northern Paman languages.
