= James Carter Cathcart =

American voice actor (1954–2025)

- Cathcart in 2017
- Born: March 8, 1954; Michigan City, Indiana, U.S.
- Died: July 8, 2025 (aged 71); New York City, U.S.
- Other names: Billy Beach; Carter Cathcart; Nicole Cathcart; Jimmy Zoppe; Jimmy Zoppi
- Occupations: Voice actor; script adaptor; voice director; pianist; vocalist
- Years active: 1981–2023
- Spouse: Martha Jacobi
- Mother: Lyn Wilde
- Musical career
- Genres: Rock; pop
- Instruments: Keyboard; guitar; vocals
- Formerly of: The Laughing Dogs

James Carter Cathcart (March 8, 1954 – July 8, 2025), also known as Jimmy Zoppi, was an American voice actor, script adaptor, voice director, pianist, and vocalist. He was best known for providing the English voices for Gary Oak, James, Meowth and Professor Oak in the Pokémon franchise.

== Life and career ==
Cathcart was born in Michigan City, Indiana, on March 8, 1954. He played with bands from the time he was in high school, including The Laughing Dogs who released two albums on Columbia in 1979–80.

Cathcart began his voice acting career in the 1980s when he played the character Cap'n O. G. Readmore on the ABC Weekend Special anthology series. He was best known for his roles in the Pokémon franchise as characters such as Gary Oak, James, Meowth and Professor Oak. He appeared in over 15 Pokémon films and over 700 episodes of the Pokémon anime. He also acted in shows such as Sonic X, Yu-Gi-Oh! Duel Monsters, One Piece, Kirby: Right Back at Ya!, Teenage Mutant Ninja Turtles, Mission Odyssey and others. He also performed in the video game Shadow the Hedgehog.

Cathcart, who was married to Martha Jacobi, retired from voice acting in 2023 following a diagnosis of throat cancer. He died on July 8, 2025, while receiving hospice care at Calvary Hospital in the Bronx, New York City. He was 71. He had three children: Nicole, Mackenzie, and Carter.
