= Jimmi Accardi =

American musician

James Leonard "Jimmi" Accardi is a musician, songwriter, and music producer.

== Career ==
Accardi has been in various bands, including, Mud In Your Eye ("Million"- Mandala Records 1972), The Laughing Dogs, and Jimmi Accardi & The Wild Cats. He also toured as lead guitarist for Chubby Checker. Accardi played lead guitar in the band Foxtrot, which backed up Rupert Holmes on his self-titled album (Epic Records) and Eon on their self-titled album (Scepter Records 1975). Accardi toured as singer, lead guitarist, and songwriter for The Laughing Dogs, who recorded two albums on Columbia Records, later re-released on Sony. With The Laughing Dogs, Accardi toured as lead guitarist behind Micky Dolenz and Davy Jones of The Monkees. Accardi also toured as lead guitarist for the Eddy Dixon Band and with Eddy produced and recorded soundtracks for motion pictures The Compleat Beatles and The Loveless. He produced three albums for Rockabilly Hall of Fame artist Al Hendrix (Clyde Allen Hendrix) and co-wrote songs ("Rockabilly Baby", "Never Stop Rockin'") with him. His song "Dance My Blues Away" was recorded by Rockabilly Hall of Fame legend Charlie Gracie (on ABKCO CD: "For The Love of Charlie").

At his studio, "The Tone Zone", in Elmhurst, NY (under the name James Leonard), he produced and engineered records for rap artists Scott LaRock and Boogie Down Productions (including the original versions of "South Bronx", "The P is Free", and "Showtime"), Ultra Magnetic ("Funky Potion", "Hook Me Up"), The Notorious Garter Kids ("Louie"), Miss Melodie ("Melody"), and KRS-One. He is also an artist on paper and canvas. His radio show, "Jimmi Accardi's Rock & Roll Party" is on KVMR-FM, Nevada City, CA. His original music has been licensed by PBS, MSNBC, UBC, CMT, HGTV, Animal Planet, USA Network, MSG Network, A&E Channel, WE Channel, Green Channel, Food Network, Cartoon Network, and others. His song, "Get Outta My Way," cowritten with Ronny Carle, is on the soundtrack of the film CBGB.

== Discography ==
- Rockin' and Jumpin' (Molehill Records 2005)
- Songs Of The Gold Rush (Molehill Records 2006)
- Rockabilly Blues (Molehill Records 2007)
- Rhythm and Blues (Molehill Records 2007)
- On The Gold Rush Trail (Molehill Records 2007)
- Thinking of You (James Leonard Accardi) (Molehill Records 2008)
- Cry of the Wild Guitar (Molehill Records 2010)
- Live Jive! (Molehill Records 2010)
- Good Rockin' Tonight (Molehill Records 2011)
- Without Words (Molehill Records)
- Live at CBGB's: The Home of Underground Rock - The Laughing Dogs "Get 'im Outta Town" and "I Need a Million". (CD Atlantic Records)
- The Laughing Dogs (as James Leonard, of The Laughing Dogs) (Columbia Records)
- The Laughing Dogs Meet Their Makers (Columbia Records)
- Punky But Chic . . . The American New Wave Scene - The Laughing Dogs, "Get 'im Outta Town" CD Risky Business (Sony 1994)
- The Laughing Dogs and The Laughing Dogs Meet Their Makers - American Beat (Sony 2009)
- CBGB: Original Motion Picture Soundtrack: 2013 release includes Laughing Dogs song "Get Outta My Way" cowritten by James Leonard and Ronny Carle.
