= North Cape York Paman languages =

Subdivision of the Paman languages

North Cape York Paman
- Northern Paman
- Geographic distribution: Cape York Peninsula, Queensland
- Linguistic classification: Pama–Nyungan: Paman; North Cape York Paman
- Subdivisions: Northern Paman (proper) †; Umpila; Wik

Language codes
- Glottolog: None nort2758 (Northern Paman) comp1236 (Wik–Umpila)
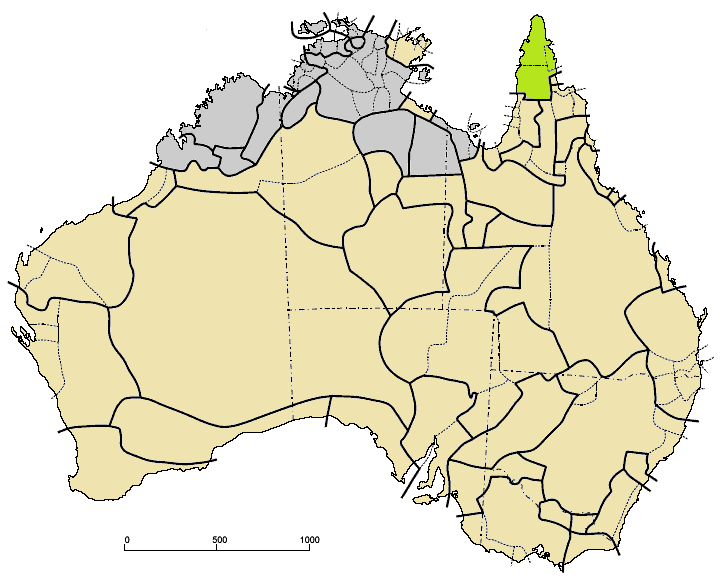
- North Cape York Paman languages (green) among other Pama–Nyungan (tan)

The North Cape York Paman languages are a subdivision of the Paman languages consisting of forty languages, all spoken on the Cape York Peninsula of Queensland, Australia. The languages are grouped largely according to R. M. W. Dixon. The only extant branches of this family are Umpila and the Wik languages. The now-extinct Northern Paman branch was unique among Pama-Nyungan languages in containing fricatives.

- North Cape York Paman
  - Northern Paman
    - Anguthimri †
      - Alngith †
      - Linngithigh †
    - Gudang (alt. Djagaraga) †
    - Uradhi †
      - Atampaya †
      - Yinwum †
      - Wuthati †
    - Luthigh (Mpalityan) †
    - Awngthim †
    - Ndra'ngith †
    - Ngkoth †
    - Arritinngithigh †
    - Adithinngithigh †
    - Mbiywom †
    - Andjingith †
  - Umpila (= Northeastern Paman, several dialects)
  - Wik languages (Middle Paman) (See)

Sutton (2001) also distinguishes a Ndwa'ngith language among Northern Paman.
