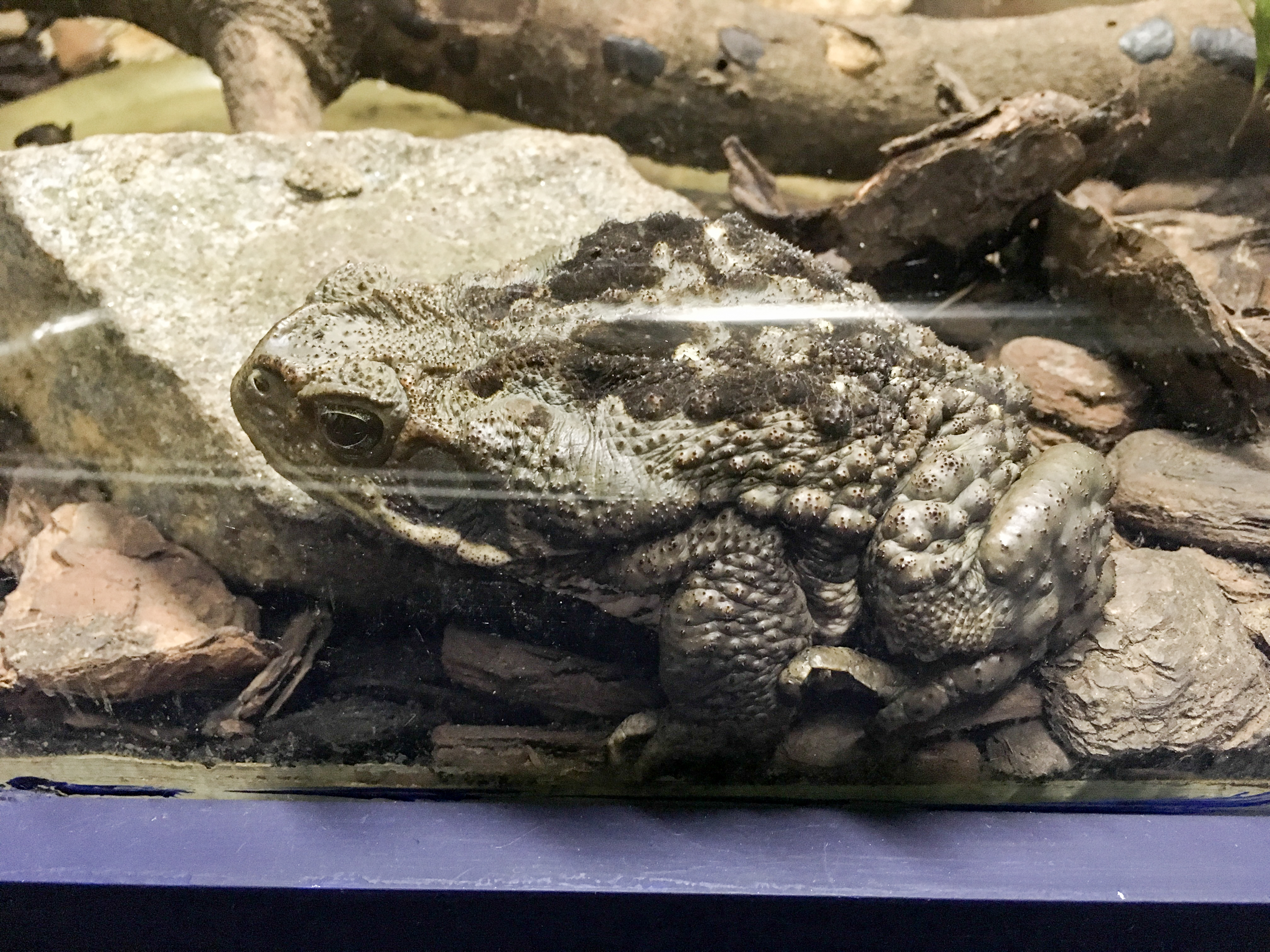

Conservation status
- Least Concern (IUCN 3.1)

Scientific classification
- Kingdom: Animalia
- Phylum: Chordata
- Class: Amphibia
- Order: Anura
- Family: Bufonidae
- Genus: Rhinella
- Species: R. jimi

Binomial name
- Rhinella jimi (Stevaux, 2002)

Synonyms
- Bufo jimi Stevaux, 2002; Chaunus jimi (Stevaux, 2002)

= Rhinella jimi =

Species of amphibian

Rhinella jimi is a species of toads in the family Bufonidae. It is endemic to northeastern Brazil and known between Bujaru in northeastern Pará and Maranhão in the north, south to Bahia and Vitória, Espírito Santo. Prior to its description in 2002, it was confused with Rhinella schneideri (=Bufo/Rhinella paracnemis). The specific name jimi honors Jorge Jim, a Brazilian herpetologist. Common name Jimi's toad has been coined for it.

== Description ==
Rhinella jimi is a stout and large toad. Adult males measure on average 147 mm (5.8 in) and adult females 134 mm (5.3 in) in snout–vent length. The holotype, an adult male measures 171 mm (6.7 in). The tympanum is distinct. The head has many cranial crests. The parotoid glands follow the supra-tympanic crests. Males have moderately strong arms, while they are slim in females. The fingers have no webbing. The legs are short and robust. The toes are fringed and have basal webbing. Dorsal skin is covered by many tubercles of different sizes. Males have keratinized spines on the dorsum, flanks, and upper surfaces of limbs. Preserved specimens are grayish beige above, mottled with dark brown spots. The parotoid glands have a more orangeish tint. The ventrum is lighter beige than in dorsum. The head is very dark, from brown to nearly black.

== Habitat and conservation ==
Rhinella jimi is a very common species that inhabits secondary forests, savanna, agricultural lands, and other open areas and disturbed habitats at elevations up to 800 m (2,600 ft). Breeding takes place in permanent and temporary ponds. Although it is used for black magic, it is not facing any major threats. It is present in many protected areas.
