= Tjungundji =

Aboriginal Australian people

The Tjungundji or Tjongkandji are an Indigenous Australian people of central and western Cape York Peninsula in northern Queensland.

== Country ==
The Tjongkandji tribe were known as a Mapoon tribe, whose lands extend along and inland from the Port Musgrave coast over an area of 150 square miles (390 km^{2}) on the lower Batavia River, extending west of its mouth southwards for some 15 miles, namely from Cullen Point, known in their language, according to Walter Roth's transcription as Tratha-m-ballayallyana (Note: tratha was a species of fish while m-ballayallyana denoted 'sheltering underrocks'. This last word was often mistranscribed as 'Tullanaringa' on early maps.) to Janie Creek.

== Alternative names ==
- Tjungundji/ Tyongandyi/ Chongandji/ Tjongangi/ Tjungundji
- Joonkoonjee/Joongoonjie
- Chunkunji/ Chinganji
- Ngucrand (perhaps a horde)

== Notes and references ==
=== References ===
- Roth, Walter E.. (15 November 1910). "Social and individual nomenclature" (PDF). Records of the Australian Museum:North Queensland Ethnography (18): 79–106. doi:10.3853/j.0067-1975.8.1910.936.
- Thomson, Donald F. (1933). "The Hero Cult, Initiation and Totemism on Cape York". Royal Anthropological Institute of Great Britain and Ireland. 63: 453–537. doi:10.2307/2843801. JSTOR 2843801.
- Thomson, Donald F. (1934). "Notes on a Hero Cult from the Gulf of Carpentaria, North Queensland". Royal Anthropological Institute of Great Britain and Ireland. 64: 217–235. doi:10.2307/2843808. JSTOR 2843808.
- Tindale, Norman Barnett (1974). "Tjongkandji (QLD)". Aboriginal Tribes of Australia: Their Terrain, Environmental Controls, Distribution, Limits, and Proper Names. Australian National University Press. ISBN 978-0-708-10741-6.
