= Jimmy Abrines =

Scottish footballer

Personal information
- Full name: James Watson Abrines
- Date of birth: 31 December 1900
- Place of birth: Renfrew, Scotland
- Date of death: 1976 (aged 75–76)
- Place of death: Troon, Strathclyde
- Position: Inside right

Senior career*
Years	Team	Apps	(Gls)
	Parkhead	?	(?)
	Albion Rovers	?	(?)
1923	Barrow	7	(0)
- * Club domestic league appearances and goals

James Watson Abrines (31 December 1900 – 1976) was a Scottish footballer who played as an inside-right in the English Football League for Barrow. He previously played for Parkhead and Albion Rovers in his native country.
