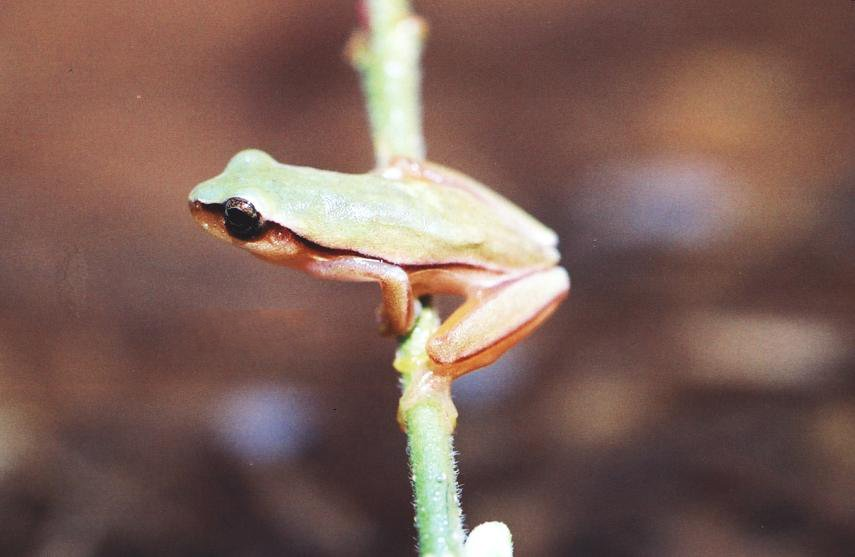

Conservation status
- Least Concern (IUCN 3.1)

Scientific classification
- Kingdom: Animalia
- Phylum: Chordata
- Class: Amphibia
- Order: Anura
- Family: Hylidae
- Genus: Dendropsophus
- Species: D. jimi

Binomial name
- Dendropsophus jimi (Napoli & Caramaschi, 1999)

= Dendropsophus jimi =

Species of frog

Dendropsophus jimi is a species of frog in the family Hylidae. It is endemic to Brazil. Its natural habitats are moist savanna, subtropical or tropical moist shrubland, subtropical or tropical high-altitude shrubland, rivers, swamps, freshwater springs, pastureland, rural gardens, ponds, and canals and ditches. It is threatened by habitat loss.
