= Trilled affricate =

Consonants with a stop beginning and trill release

In articulatory phonetics, trilled affricates, also known as post-trilled consonants, are consonants which begin as a stop and have a trill release. These consonants are reported to exist in some Northern Paman languages in Australia, as well as in some Chapacuran languages such as Wariʼ and Oro Win, Austronesian languages such as Fijian and Malagasy, and in Namuyi.

Sound (voiceless)	IPA	Languages	Sound (voiced)	IPA	Languages
Voiceless trilled bilabial affricate	[pʙ̥]	Namuyi	Voiced trilled bilabial affricate	[bʙ]	Kele and Avava. Only reported in an allophone of [mb] before [o] or [u], Namuyi
Voiceless trilled alveolar affricate	[tr̥]	Ngkoth	Voiced trilled alveolar affricate	[dr]	Nias, Fijian and Avava also have this sound after [n].
Voiceless trilled retroflex affricate	[ʈɽ̊]	Baima	Voiced trilled retroflex affricate	[ɖɽ]	Baima
Voiceless epiglottal affricate	[ʡʜ]	Not attested in any natural language, but may occur in Hydaburg Haida.	Voiced epiglottal affricate	[ʡʢ]	Hydaburg Haida. Possibly voiceless or a stop instead. Cognate to Southern Haida [ɢ], Masset Haida [ʕ].

In Fijian, trilling is rare in these sounds, and they are frequently distinguished by being postalveolar. In Malagasy, they may have a rhotic release, [ʈɽ̝̊ ɳʈɽ̝̊ ɖɽ̝ ɳɖɽ̝], be simple stops, [ʈ ɳʈ ɖ ɳɖ], or standard affricates, [ʈʂ ɳʈʂ ɖʐ ɳɖʐ]. Similarly, the trilled retroflex affricates [ʈɽ̝̊ ʈɽ̝̊ʰ ɖɽ̝ ᶯɖɽ̝] have been reported to occur in Baima, though phonetically they may be closer to sequences of a stop and fricative trill.

Most post-trilled consonants are affricates: the stop and trill share the same place of articulation. However, there is a rare exception in a few neighboring Amazonian languages, where a voiceless bilabially post-trilled dental stop, [t̪͡ʙ̥] (occasionally written [tᵖ]) is reported from a few words in the Chapacuran languages Wariʼ and Oro Win. In the Chapacuran languages, [tʙ̥] is reported almost exclusively before rounded vowels such as [o] and [y]. Sangtam contrasts [t̪͡ʙ̥] with aspirated [t̪͡ʙ̥ʰ].

Hydaburg Haida [ʡʢ] is cognate to Southern Haida [ɢ], Masset Haida [ʕ].

Place →	Labial					Coronal										Dorsal					Laryngeal			
Manner ↓	Bilabial		Labiodental		Linguolabial		Dental		Alveolar		Postalveolar		Retroflex		(Alveolo-)palatal		Velar		Uvular		Pharyngeal/epiglottal		Glottal	
Nasal	m̥	m	ɱ̊	ɱ		n̼	n̪̊	n̪	n̥	n	n̠̊	n̠	ɳ̊	ɳ	ɲ̊	ɲ	ŋ̊	ŋ	ɴ̥	ɴ				
Plosive	p	b	p̪	b̪	t̼	d̼	t̪	d̪	t	d			ʈ	ɖ	c	ɟ	k	ɡ	q	ɢ	ʡ		ʔ	
Sibilant affricate							t̪s̪	d̪z̪	ts	dz	t̠ʃ	d̠ʒ	tʂ	dʐ	tɕ	dʑ								
Non-sibilant affricate	pɸ	bβ	p̪f	b̪v			t̪θ	d̪ð	tɹ̝̊	dɹ̝	t̠ɹ̠̊˔	d̠ɹ̠˔			cç	ɟʝ	kx	ɡɣ	qχ	ɢʁ	ʡʜ	ʡʢ	ʔh	
Sibilant fricative							s̪	z̪	s	z	ʃ	ʒ	ʂ	ʐ	ɕ	ʑ								
Non-sibilant fricative	ɸ	β	f	v	θ̼	ð̼	θ	ð	θ̠	ð̠	ɹ̠̊˔	ɹ̠˔	ɻ̊˔	ɻ˔	ç	ʝ	x	ɣ	χ	ʁ	ħ	ʕ	h	ɦ
Approximant		β̞		ʋ				ð̞		ɹ		ɹ̠		ɻ		j		ɰ						˷
Tap/flap		ⱱ̟		ⱱ					ɾ̥	ɾ			ɽ̊	ɽ						ɢ̆		ʡ̆		
Trill	ʙ̥	ʙ							r̥	r		r̠	ɽ̊r̥	ɽr					ʀ̥	ʀ	ʜ	ʢ		
Lateral affricate									tɬ	dɮ			tꞎ	d𝼅	c𝼆	ɟʎ̝	k𝼄	ɡʟ̝						
Lateral fricative							ɬ̪		ɬ	ɮ			ꞎ	𝼅	𝼆	ʎ̝	𝼄	ʟ̝						
Lateral approximant								l̪	l̥	l		l̠	ɭ̊	ɭ	ʎ̥	ʎ	ʟ̥	ʟ		ʟ̠				
Lateral tap/flap									ɺ̥	ɺ			𝼈̊	𝼈		ʎ̆		ʟ̆						

		BL	LD	D	A	PA	RF	P	V	U
Implosive	Voiced	ɓ			ɗ		ᶑ	ʄ	ɠ	ʛ
Implosive	Voiceless	ɓ̥			ɗ̥		ᶑ̊	ʄ̊	ɠ̊	ʛ̥
Ejective	Stop	pʼ			tʼ		ʈʼ	cʼ	kʼ	qʼ
Ejective	Affricate		p̪fʼ	tθʼ	tsʼ	tʃʼ	tʂʼ	tɕʼ	kxʼ	qχʼ
Ejective	Fricative	ɸʼ	fʼ	θʼ	sʼ	ʃʼ	ʂʼ	ɕʼ	xʼ	χʼ
Ejective	Lateral affricate				tɬʼ			c𝼆ʼ	k𝼄ʼ	q𝼄ʼ
Ejective	Lateral fricative				ɬʼ					
Click (top: velar; bottom: uvular)	Tenuis	kʘ qʘ		kǀ qǀ	kǃ qǃ		k𝼊 q𝼊	kǂ qǂ		
Click (top: velar; bottom: uvular)	Voiced	ɡʘ ɢʘ		ɡǀ ɢǀ	ɡǃ ɢǃ		ɡ𝼊 ɢ𝼊	ɡǂ ɢǂ		
Click (top: velar; bottom: uvular)	Nasal	ŋʘ ɴʘ		ŋǀ ɴǀ	ŋǃ ɴǃ		ŋ𝼊 ɴ𝼊	ŋǂ ɴǂ	ʞ	
Click (top: velar; bottom: uvular)	Tenuis lateral				kǁ qǁ					
Click (top: velar; bottom: uvular)	Voiced lateral				ɡǁ ɢǁ					
Click (top: velar; bottom: uvular)	Nasal lateral				ŋǁ ɴǁ					
