= Jim (given name) =

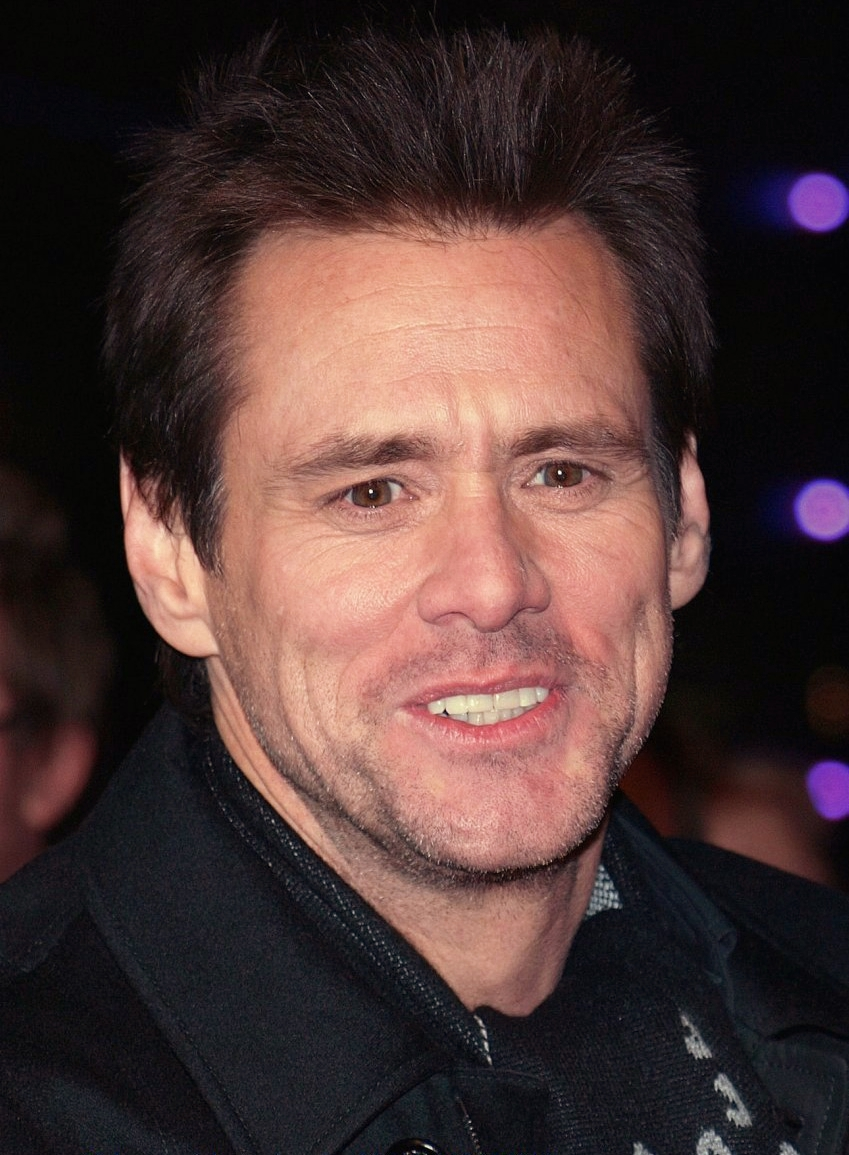
- Jim Carrey in 2008
- Pronunciation: /ˈdʒɪm/ JIM
- Gender: Male
- Language: English

Origin
- Languages: 1. Hebrew; 2. Latin; 3. English
- Origin: Diminutive form of James
- Region of origin: English-speaking world

Other names
- Related names: Jimmy, Jimi, Jimmi, Jimmie, James, Jimbo

Jim is a masculine given name. It is often short for James, or Jimmy.

== People ==
- Jim Abbott (born 1967), American baseball player
- Jim Acosta (born 1971), American journalist
- Jim Adkins (born 1975), American rock musician, lead guitarist and vocalist of band Jimmy Eat World
- Jim Al-Khalili (born 1962), British physicist and author
- Jim Bacchus (born 1949), American politician
- Jim Backus (1913–1989), American actor
- Jim Baker (1818–1898), American explorer
- Jim Bakker (1940–2026), American televangelist
- Jim Balsillie (born 1961), Canadian businessman
- Jim Banks (born 1979), American politician
- Jim Belushi (born 1954), American actor
- Jim Bennett (1947–2023), British museum curator and historian of science
- Jim Betts (born c. 1932), American politician
- Jim Betts (born 1949), American gridiron football player, university administrator, and business executive
- Jim Black (born 1967), American jazz musician
- Jim Boeheim (born 1944), American basketball coach
- Jim Bolger (1935–2025), New Zealand politician
- Jim Bottomley (1900–1959), American baseball player
- Jim Bouton (1939–2019), American baseball player
- Jim Bowen (1937–2018), English comedian and television personality
- Jim Boyd (1920–2006), American racing driver
- Jim Breuer (born 1967), American comedian
- Jim Breyer (born 1961), American venture capitalist
- Jim Brickman (born 1961), American composer and recording artist
- Jim Bridger (1804–1881), American explorer
- Jim Bridwell (1944–2018), American rock climber
- Jim Broadbent (born 1949), English actor
- Jim Brown, multiple people
- Jim Browne (1930–2003), American basketball player
- Jim Browne (American football) (born 1962), American football player
- Jim Browning, multiple people
- Jim J. Bullock (born 1955), American actor
- Jim Bunning (1931–2017), American baseball player and politician
- Jim Burwell (1898–1974), one of the Alcoholics Anonymous (AA) founding members
- Jim Buss (born 1959), American basketball executive
- Jim Butcher (born 1971), American author
- Jim Buttress (born 1945), British horticulturalist and gardener
- Jim Caldwell, multiple people
- Jim Campbell, multiple people
- Jim Cantore (born 1964), American meteorologist and on-air TV personality
- Jim Capaldi (1944–2005), English musician and songwriter
- Jim Caple (1962–2023), American sportswriter
- Jim Carrey (born 1962), Canadian-American actor
- Jim Carroll (1949–2009), American poet and author
- Jim Carter (born 1948), English actor
- Jim Caviezel (born 1968), American actor
- Jim Chapman, multiple people
- Jim Clancy, multiple people
- Jim Clark (1936–1968), British racing driver
  - Jim Clark (criminal) (1902–1974), American bank robber and Depression-era outlaw
  - Jim Clark (film editor) (1931–2016), British film editor and director
  - Jim Clark (Australian politician) (1891–1963), Australian politician
  - Jim Clark (sheriff) (1922–2007), American sheriff
- Jim Clyburn (born 1940), American politician
- Jim Coffeen (1887–1955), American football player
- Jim Conroy (born 1970), American voice actor
- Jim Cooper (born 1954), American politician
- Jim Cornette (born 1961), American professional wrestling personality
- Jim Corr (born 1964), Irish musician
- Jim Costa (born 1952), American politician
- Jim Courage (born 1947), American racing driver
- Jim Courier (born 1970), American tennis player
- Jim Cramer (born 1955), American TV personality
- Jim Crane (born 1954), American businessman
- Jim Crawford, multiple people
- Jim Croce (1943–1973), American folk and rock singer-songwriter
- Jim Cummings (born 1952), American voice actor
- Jim D'Arcy (1919–2001), British socialist
- Jim D'Arcy (born 1954), Irish politician
- Jim Dale (born 1935), British actor, singer, songwriter
- Jim Davidson (born 1953), British stand-up comedian
- Jim Davis (born 1945), American cartoonist
- Jim DeMint (born 1951), American politician
- Jim Devine (born 1953), British politician
- Jim Dowd (born 1951), British politician
- Jim Dowd (born 1968), American ice hockey player
- Jim Downey (born 1952), American humorist
- Jim Doyle, multiple people
- Jim Bob Duggar (born 1965), American television personality
- Jim Eastwood (born 1978), Northern Irish businessman
- Jim Ellis, multiple people
- Jim Evans (born 1950s), American painter
- Jim Everett (born 1963), American football player
- Jim Farley (born 1962), American business executive
- Jim Fassel (1949–2021), American football player and coach
- Jim Florentine (born 1964), American comedian
- Jim Fitzgerald (1926–2012), American businessman and professional sports owner
- Jim Fitzpatrick, multiple people
- Jim Folsom (1908-1987), American politician
  - Jim Folsom Jr. (born 1949), American politician, son of the above
- Jim Forbes (1923–2019), Australian politician
- Jim Foster, multiple people
- Jim French, multiple people
- Jim Furyk (born 1970), American golfer
- Jim Gaffigan (born 1966), American comedian
- Jim Garrison (1921–1992), American district attorney
- Jim Gibbons, multiple people
- Jim Gilliam (1928–1978), American baseball player
- Jim Gordon (1945–2023), American musician
- Jim Grabb (born 1964), American tennis player
- Jim Gray (born 1959), American sportscaster
- Jim Gray (1944–lost at sea 2007), American computer scientist and Turing Award recipient
- Jim Gray (born 1953), American politician
- Jim Gray (born 1945), American jurist, writer and politician
- Jim Inhofe (born 1934), American politician
- Jim Haadsma (born 1958), American politician
- Jim Hagedorn (1962–2022), American politician
- Jim Hall, multiple people
- Jim Hanks (born 1961), American actor
- Jim Hanratty (1936–1962), British murderer
- Jim Harbaugh (born 1963), American football coach
- Jim Harris, multiple people
- Jim Harrison (1937–2016), American poet, novelist, and essayist
- Jim Hart, multiple people
- Jim Haslam (born 1930), American businessman
- Jim Heath (born 1956), American football and baseball coach
- Jim Hellwig (1959–2014), American professional wrestler better known as Ultimate Warrior
- Jim Henry, multiple people
- Jim Henson (1936–1990), American film director and puppeteer
- Jim Higgins, multiple people
- Jim Hill, multiple people
- Jim Himes (born 1966), American businessman and politician
- Jim Hodder (1947–1990), American drummer
- Jim Hodder (born 1940), Canadian politician
- Jim Hogan, multiple people
- Jim Hogg (1851–1906), American lawyer and statesman
- Jim Hooks (born 1950), American football player
- Jim Hopper, multiple people
- Jim Hunt (born 1937), American politician
- Jim Hutton (1934–1979), American actor
- Jim Irsay (1959–2025), American football executive and owner
- Jim Jackson, multiple people
- Jim James (born 1978), American vocalist, guitarist, producer and songwriter
- Jim Jarmusch (born 1953), American film director and screenwriter
- Jim Jefferies (born 1977), Australian stand-up comedian
- Jim Jeffords (1934–2014), American politician
- Jim Jinkins (born 1953), American animator
- Jim Johnson, multiple people
- Jim Jones (1931–1978), American religious cult leader
- Jim Jones (born 1976), American rapper
- Jim Jonsin (born 1970), American record producer
- Jim Jordan, multiple people
- Jim Justice (born 1951), American politician
- Jim Kaat (born 1938), American baseball player and analyst
- Jim Kelly, multiple people
- Jim Keltner (born 1942), American drummer
- Jim Kerr (born 1959), Scottish singer
- Jim Yong Kim (born 1959), American physician
- Jim Lang (born 1950), American composer
- Jim Lauderdale (born 1957), American musician
- Jim Lea (born 1949), British musician
- Jim Leavy (c.1842–1882), Irish gunfighter in the American Old West
- Jim Lee (born 1964), Korean-American comic book artist, writer, and editor
- Jim Lehrer (1934–2020), American journalist and writer
- Jim Leighton (born 1958), Scottish footballer
- Jim LeMaster, American politician
- Jim Letherer (1933–2001), American civil-rights activist
- Jim Lonborg (born 1942), American baseball player
- Jim Lovell (born 1928–2025), American astronaut
- Jim Marrs, American author
- Jim Marshall, multiple people
- Jim Mattis (born 1950), American retired general
- Jim McClarin (born 1945/1946), American politician
- Jim McGovern (born 1959), American politician
- Jim McKay (1921–2008), American television sports journalist
- Jim McMahon (born 1959), American football player
- Jim Melchert (1930–2023), American visual artist
- Jim Melenchuk (born 1953), Canadian politician
- Jim Messina (born 1947), American musician
- Jim Messina (born 1969), American political advisor
- Jim Miller, multiple people
- Jim Miller (born 1983), American mixed martial artist
- Jim Mitchell, multiple people
- Jim Moore, multiple people
- Jim Moran (born 1945), American politician
- Jim Morrison (1943–1971), American poet and singer of The Doors
- Jim Nabors (1930–2017), American actor
- Jim Nantz (born 1959), American sportscaster
- Jim Neidhart (1955–2018), American professional wrestler
- Jim Nelson, multiple people
- Jim Norton (born 1968), American comedian, radio personality, actor, author, and podcast host
- Jim Norton, multiple people
- Jim Obergefell (born 1966), American civil rights activist
- Jim Otto (1938–2024), American football player
- Jim Palmer (born 1945), American baseball player and analyst
- Jim Parrack (born 1981), American actor
- Jim Parsons (born 1973), American actor
- Jim Pattison (born 1928), Canadian businessman
- Jim Peebles (born 1935), Canadian-American astrophysicist and cosmologist
- Jim Peterik (born 1950), American musician and songwriter
- Jim Piddock (born 1956), British actor
- Jim Plunkett (born 1947), American football player
- Jim Price, multiple people
- Jim Ramey (born 1957), American gridiron football player
- Jim Redmond (c.1940/1941–2022), Trinidadian-British engineer
- Jim Ratcliffe (born 1952), British engineer and businessman
- Jim Reeves (1923–1964), American singer and songwriter
- Jim Reich (born 1942), American racing driver
- Jim Rice (born 1953), American baseball player
- Jim Risch (born 1943), American lawyer and politician
- Jim Rogers (born 1942), American businessman and writer
- Jim Rohn (1930–2009), American entrepreneur
- Jim Rome (born 1964), American broadcaster
- Jim Ross (born 1952), American professional wrestling commentator
- Jim Rosenthal (born 1947), English sports presenter and commentator
- Jim Roth, multiple people
- Jim Ryan, multiple people
- Jim Ryun (born 1947), American politician and track athlete
- Jim Schwartz (born 1966), American football coach
- Jim Scott, multiple people
- Jim Sensenbrenner (born 1943), American politician
- Jim Sheridan (born 1949), Irish film director
- Jim Shooter (born 1951), American comic book writer
- Jim Simons (1938–2024), American mathematician and billionaire
- Jim Simpson, multiple people
- Jim Smith, multiple people
- Jim Starlin (born 1949), American comics artist and writer
- Jim Stevenson, multiple people
- Jim Stewart, multiple people
- Jim Stynes (1966–2012), Australian rules footballer
- Jim Sturgess (born 1978), English actor
- Jim Sullivan (English footballer) (1904–1974), English footballer
- Jim Taylor, multiple people
- Jim Threapleton (born 1973), British painter and film director
- Jim Thome (born 1970), American baseball player
- Jim Thompson (1906–1977), American author and screenwriter
- Jim Thompson (1906–disappeared 1967), American fashion designer
- Jim Thorpe (1888–1953), American athlete
- Jim Tressel (born 1952), American politician and football coach
- Jim Guy Tucker (born 1943), American politician
- Jim Turner, multiple people
- Jim Vallance (born 1952), Canadian musical artist
- Jim Varney (1949–2000), American actor
- Jim Walden (born 1966), American lawyer
- Jim Wallhead (born 1984), English mixed martial arts fighter
- Jim Walsh, multiple people
- Jim Walton (born 1948), American businessman
- Jim Warn (born 1983), American racing driver
- Jim Warren, multiple people
- Jim Watson (born 1961), Canadian politician and the 59th mayor of Ottawa
- Jim Wetherbee (born 1952), American astronaut, aviator and engineer
- Jim Webb (born 1946), American politician, military officer and author
- Jim Wiggins (1922–1999), English actor
- Jim Williams, multiple people
- Jim Williamson, multiple people
- Jim Wilson, multiple people
- Jim Wise (born 1964), American actor
- Jim Wiseman (born 1949), Canadian politician
- Jim Wright (1922–2015), American politician
- Jim Wynorski, American film director
- Jim Yardley (born 1964), American journalist
- Jim Yeadon (born 1949), American activist and politician
- Jim Yeats (1936–2023), American football player
- Jim Yester (born 1939), American musician
- Jim Youel (1922–2020), American football player
- Jim Young (1915–1992), Irish hurler and Gaelic footballer
- Jim Young (born 1935), American football player and coach
- Jim Younger (1848–1902), American outlaw
- Jim Youngs (born 1956), American actor
- Jim Zapp (1924–2016), American baseball player
- Jim Zebrowski (born 1967), American football coach
- Jim Zeigler (born 1948), American politician
- Jim Ziolkowski, American businessman
- Jim Zockoll (1930–2024), American businessman within franchising
- Jim Zoet (born 1953), Canadian basketball player
- Jim Zorn (born 1953), American football player and coach
- Jim Zub, Canadian comic book writer
- Jim Zulevic (1965–2006), American actor
- Jim Zumbo (born 1940), American firearms and hunting commentator and writer

== Fictional characters ==
- Jimmy and Jim, the main character in the movie 28 Days Later
- Jim, one of The Blues in Angry Birds
- Jim, a character in 1990 American fantasy romance movie Edward Scissorhands
- Jim, one of two major characters in the classic novel Adventures of Huckleberry Finn
- Jim Bell, a character in the British sitcom Friday Night Dinner
- Jim Crow, a Blackface minstrel character created by white minstrel show performer Thomas D. Rice
- Jim Corrigan, a character in numerous comic books published by DC Comics.
- Big Jim, a supporting character in the comic book series Dog Man
- Jim Block, a character in the American film Final Destination 5
- Jim Bergerac, a main character from the British crime drama television series, Bergerac
- Jim Brockmire, a main character from the American sitcom, Brockmire
- Jim Wilson, a character in Marvel comics
- Jim Halpert, a character in the American version of the television sitcom The Office
- Dr. Jim Hansen, a character in the American television series Providence
- Jim Hawkins, the protagonist in Robert Louis Stevenson's novel Treasure Island
- Jim Hopper, a character in the television series Stranger Things
- Jim Robinson, a character from the Australian soap opera Neighbours
- Jim Lahey, a trailer park supervisor on Trailer Park Boys
- Jim Ellison, character from The Sentinel
- Jim Lake Jr., the protagonist in Trollhunters: Tales of Arcadia
- Jim Levenstein, a main character in the American Pie film series
- Jim Medina, a character in Soy Luna
- Jim Raynor, a character in StarCraft II: Wings of Liberty
- Jim Rockford, a character on the television series The Rockford Files
- Jim Phelps, a character from the American multimedia franchise, Mission: Impossible
- Jim Morita, a character appearing in American comic books published by Marvel Comics
- Jim Ignatowski, a character in the 1970s television series Taxi
- Jim Robinson, character in the Australian soap opera Neighbours
- Jim Taggart, a main character from the Scottish detective fiction television program, Taggart
- Jim Taggart, a main character from the American science fiction television series, Eureka
- Jim Clancy, a character from Ghost Whisperer
- Jim Chapman, a playable character from the video game, Resident Evil Outbreak
- Jim Walsh, a character in Beverly Hills, 90210
- Sheriff Jim Valenti, a main character from the American science fiction television series, Roswell
- Earthworm Jim, the titular character in the Earthworm Jim franchise

== See also ==
- Jim (disambiguation)
