= Hawaiian name =

A Hawaiian name is a name in the Hawaiian language. Such names are popular not only in Hawaiian families, but also among other residents of Hawaii, and even in the United States mainland among both non-native and native Hawaiians.

== Meanings of names ==
Genuine Hawaiian names are unisex. Their literal meaning is usually quite clear, but there may be hidden symbolic meanings known only to the family. Old Hawaiians saw a name as the property of the name-holder, with a power to help or hurt its owner. A meaning that was too apparent might have attracted evil forces. And, just like in Hawaiian poetry, an allusion was considered more beautiful than a plain statement.

Coolness and rain symbolize happiness in a warm climate. Mist is a symbol of romance. Lei means a child, because a beloved child is carried like a lei on the parent's shoulders. A child can also be a flower or a bud, regardless of its sex. Modern parents tend to be more prosaic, calling a child a child, as in Keikilani and Kamalani, in which keiki and kama both mean "child".

== Traditional naming practices ==
Old Hawaiians coined a new name for each child, with careful thought of its meaning. Names might be revealed in dreams or visions. Children could be named after relatives, but names were not copied from other families. Hawaii was a hierarchical society, and the name had to be suitable to one's social class and family gods. Names beginning with Kealiʻi-("the chief") or ending in -lani ("sky or heaven") were reserved for chiefs. The lowest social kauwā (slave) class were only allowed to take simple names from natural objects.

Any incident at the time of birth might be commemorated in a name. A famous example was the Queen Liliʻuokalani ("scorching pain of the heaven"), called Liliʻu ("scorch") Kamakaʻeha ("the sore eye") in childhood. The name was chosen by her great-aunt Kīnaʻu who was suffering from an eye-ache. A person might have several names, formal and informal, and names were changed if they seemed harmful. If a child fell ill, evil sorcery was often suspected. The parents might change the name into something repulsive, like Pupuka ("ugly") or Kūkae ("excrement") in order to protect the child. Such names did not cause ostracism among Hawaiians, but foreign visitors were scandalized. An American writes in 1851:

"You might know that a people must have been vile from the vile names they assume and wear without shame – names that one would be unwilling to translate. All evil appetites and qualities, bodily organs and deformities, mischievous acts and vices, were turned into names."

In nineteenth century marriage documents, we can find several Hawaiians named, for example, Kamaʻi ("the illness; the genitals"), Kaʻaihue ("the thief"), Kapela ("the filth") and Waiwaiʻole ("worthless"). However, the majority of names have quite pleasant meanings, or are simply descriptive. The most common names, used by both genders, were Kalua ("the second child, companion"), Keawe ("the strand", symbolic of lineage), Kamaka ("the eye", symbolic of beloved one), Keaka ("the shadow, essence"), Kealoha ("the love"), ʻŌpūnui ("big belly", sign of high social class), and Māhoe ("twin"). The most striking feature of nineteenth century names is their diversity. A unique name was the rule, not the exception. The ten most common names cover only four percent of the population.

== Changes brought by western influence ==
Surnames did not exist in ancient Hawaii. Early converts might adopt a Christian name and use their Hawaiian name like a surname. In 1860 Kamehameha IV signed the Act to Regulate Names. Hawaiians were to take their father's given name as a surname, and all children born henceforth were to receive a Christian, i.e. English, given name. Hawaiian names were transferred into middle names. The law was not repealed until 1967.

After the annexation of Hawaii to the U.S., knowledge of the Hawaiian language deteriorated. Grandparents could give traditional names to the next two generations, but a baby born into a Hawaiian family in the 2000s might not have any native speaker relatives. Names are borrowed from well-known persons, royalty, mythology, and songs. However, names are sometimes borrowed from direct ancestors and other family members. Mary Kawena Pukui, a traditional Hawaiian, expressed her unease with this practice:

"My name isn't supposed to be given away. My name is for me. But people are always naming babies after me, so I have many namesakes. I don't want any of them hurt if there's any kapu that goes with my name. So I pray, 'Since so-and-so named this child for me, then please do me the favor to ʻoki the kapu and bless the name."

Phonetic renderings of western names, such as Kimo (Jim) and Lāhela (Rachel), have become names in their own right. The film industry produces pseudo-Hawaiian names, from Aloma of the South Seas (1926) to Lilo & Stitch (2002). For many Hawaiian words, the ʻokina (glottal stop) and kahakō (macron to denote a long vowel) are important to the meaning of a word. They are often ignored in English texts, or ʻokina are added where they do not belong. Hawaiian vowels should be pronounced clearly even when they are not stressed.

== Popularity surveys ==
This information is based on a survey of Hawaiian given names of persons born in 1900–1989 and 2000–2005, from obituaries in Honolulu Advertiser and Honolulu Star-Bulletin 1994–2004, and samples of births and marriages on Oʻahu in Honolulu Star-Bulletin 2000–2005. It's a small sample with an uneven age distribution, and centered on Oʻahu. But no one else seems to have researched the subject at all.

The 3,750 persons in the survey had a total of 1,996 different names. 418 of these names had eight or more syllables (up to 44). The proportion of long names was diminishing but it took an upward turn in 2000–2005. Hawaiian names occur as middle names until the 1960s. Even today, middle names outnumber first names by four to one. A minority of parents have started giving nothing but Hawaiian names to their children. In births registered on Oʻahu 2001–2002, about 25% of girls and 15% of boys received at least one Hawaiian name.

Names with negative meaning have disappeared in this sample, and the unisex quality is waning. Many favorite names a hundred years ago, like Kealoha, Kalei, Leialoha, and Keonaona, were popular with both sexes. Today, the trendiest names are different for girls and boys. Modern parents seemed to think that the ending -lani belongs to women: 31% of women but only 11% of men had names ending in -lani (heaven), -o-ka-lani (of Heaven), -o-nā-lani (of the heavens) or -mai-ka-lani (from Heaven), a recent innovation. Names beginning with the definite article Ka-/Ke- seem to have a masculine image: 46% of men but only 33% of women had such names.

Five percent of the women in this survey were named Leilani ("heavenly lei"). Other popular women's names included:

- 1900–1939: Kuʻulei ("my lei"), Leināʻala ("the fragrances are wafted"), Leialoha ("lei of love"), Leinani ("beautiful lei"), Leimomi ("pearl necklace")
- 1940–1969: Puanani ("beautiful flower"), Leialoha, Haunani ("beautiful snow"), ʻIwalani ("royal Frigatebird"), Uʻilani ("heavenly young beauty"), Ululani ("heavenly inspiration")
- 1970–1989: Malia (Mary), Kēhaulani ("heavenly dew"), Kuʻuipo ("my sweetheart"), Maile ("the maile vine"), Noelani ("heavenly mist"), Puanani
- 2000–2005: Malia, Noelani, Māhealani ("full moon night"), Kuʻuipo, Alana ("awakening" – although this is also an English name), Keikilani ("heavenly child")

Kalani ("the sky; the high chief") was a reasonably popular men's name in all age groups. Other popular names for men included:

- 1900–1939: Kealoha ("the love"), Kalei ("the lei"), Kamaka ("the eye/bud/beloved one")
- 1940–1969: Keʻala ("the fragrance", symbolic for high birth), Kāwika (David), Kanani ("the glory"), Kameāloha ("the beloved one")
- 1970–1989: Ikaika ("strong"), Kāwika, ʻAlika (Alex), Keola ("the life")
- 2000–2005: Kai ("sea"), Kekoa ("the courage"), Kainoa ("the namesake"), Ikaika, Kaimana ("diamond; powerful sea"), Keoni (John), Makana ("gift"), Nāinoa ("the namesakes")

The Social Security Administration gives out annual lists of the top hundred names for boys and girls in the State of Hawaii, starting from the year 1960. They are based on first names while a Hawaiian name usually comes second. A few Hawaiian names make it into these lists every year. In 2008, they were Kaila ("style/the birthmark", although this is also an English variant of Kayla), Maile, Malia, Kalena ("the yellow"), Kiana (Diana), Alana and Kamalei ("lei child") for girls, and Kai, Kainoa, Keanu ("the coolness"), Kainalu ("billowy sea"), Nāinoa, Kaimana and Kanoa ("the commoner, free man") for boys.

== See also ==
- Kailani
