= Jim Williamson =

Jim Williamson may refer to:

- Jim Williamson (association footballer) (1926–2005), 1940s footballer for Tranmere Rovers
- Jim Williamson (footballer, born January 1909) (1909–1983), Australian rules footballer for St Kilda and Geelong
- Jim Williamson (footballer, born February 1909) (1909–2003), Australian rules footballer for Carlton
- Jim Williamson (footballer, born 1876) (1876–1956), Australian rules footballer for South Melbourne
- Jim Williamson (pole vaulter), winner of the 1970 pole vault at the NCAA Division I Indoor Track and Field Championships

== See also ==
- James Williamson (disambiguation)
