= Gym (disambiguation) =

A gym is a place for exercise and sports.

Gym can also refer to:

- Gym (health club), a fitness venue
- Gym class, a school class best known as physical education
- Gym (Louie), a 2010 episode of American comedy-drama TV series Louie
- Gym (OpenAI), an artificial general intelligence benchmark released by OpenAI
- Gym (Peep Show), a 2007 episode of British TV sitcom Peep Show
- Guaymí language, a language spoken in Panama and Costa Rica, by ISO 639 code
- Guaymas International Airport, an airport in Sonoma, Mexico, by IATA code
- Great Yarmouth railway station in Norfolk, England, by station code

== See also ==
- Jim (disambiguation)
- JYM (disambiguation)
- Gim (disambiguation)
