= James Mitchell =

James Mitchell may refer to:

== Entertainment ==
- James Mitchell (actor) (1920–2010), American actor who played Palmer Cortlandt on All My Children
- James Mitchell (writer) (1926–2002), British writer whose works include the TV series Callan and When The Boat Comes In
- James "Jim" Mitchell, American porn director who killed his brother; see Mitchell brothers
- James Leslie Mitchell, British author who used the pseudonym Lewis Grassic Gibbon

== Politics ==
- James Mitchell (Australian politician) (1866–1951), Premier of Western Australia 1919–1924 and 1930–1933
- James Mitchell (Canadian politician) (1843–1897), legislator from New Brunswick
- James Mitchell (Covenanter) (died 1678), Scottish fanatic who tried to murder an archbishop
- James Mitchell (loyalist) (1920–2008), Ulster loyalist and Royal Ulster Constabulary officer
- James Mitchell (New South Wales politician) (1789 or 1792–1869), New South Wales surgeon, businessman and politician
- James Coffield Mitchell (1786–1843), U.S. Congressman from Tennessee
- James Fitz-Allen Mitchell (1931–2021), prime minister of Saint Vincent and the Grenadines
- James George Mitchell (1847–1919), Pennsylvania state senator and United States soldier
- James L. Mitchell (1834–1894), mayor of Indianapolis, Indiana
- James P. Mitchell (1900–1964), American politician, Secretary of Labor in the Eisenhower administration
- James S. Mitchell (1784–1844), U.S. congressman from Pennsylvania
- James Mitchell (Arkansas politician), served in Arkansas General Assembly, 1860

== Sports ==
- James Mitchell (American football) (born 1999), American football player
- James Mitchel (1864–1921), Irish-American athlete who competed in the 1904 Summer Olympics
- James Mitchell (basketball) (born 1991), Australian basketball player
- James Mitchell (footballer, born 1880) (1880–1958), Scottish footballer for Kilmarnock and Scotland
- James Mitchell (footballer, born 1897) (1897–1975), English international footballer
- James Mitchell (rugby union) (born 1995), English rugby player
- Father James Mitchell (born 1965), American wrestling manager

== Other ==
- James Mitchell (herald) (1836–1898), Scottish officer of arms
- James Mitchell (Methodist minister) (1818–1903), also Commissioner of Emigration
- James Mitchell (poker player) (born 1989), English poker player
- James Mitchell (Scottish minister) (1830–1911), Scottish minister and social organizer
- James C. Mitchell (settler) (1810–1860), founder of the town of Florence, Nebraska
- J. Clyde Mitchell (1918–1995), British anthropologist
- James Elmer Mitchell (born 1952), American psychologist and interrogation consultant
- James G. Mitchell (born 1943), Canadian computer scientist
- James Hart Mitchell (1899–1921), English World War I flying ace
- James T. Mitchell (1834–1915), Chief Justice of the Pennsylvania Supreme Court

== See also ==
- Jamie Mitchell (disambiguation)
- Jim Mitchell (disambiguation)
