= James Nelson =

James Nelson may refer to:

- James Nelson (politician) (fl. 1833–1836), American politician from Maryland
- James Nelson (cricketer) (1873–1950), New Zealand cricketer
- James Nelson (sound editor) (1932–2014), American sound editor and film producer
- James C. Nelson (born 1944), justice on the Montana Supreme Court
- Jamie Nelson (James Victor Nelson, born 1959), American baseball player
- James L. Nelson (born 1962), American historical naval novelist
- James Nelson (tennis) (born 1982), British professional tennis player

== See also ==
- Nelson (surname)
- Jim Nelson (disambiguation)
- Jimmy Nelson (disambiguation)
- Jamie Lindemann Nelson, American philosopher and bioethicist
