= JYM =

JYM may refer to:

- Junior Yearly Meeting, a gathering for young Quakers
- Junior Year in Munich, an American study abroad program
- Hillsdale Municipal Airport, Hillsdale, Michigan, U.S., FAA LID: JYM

== See also ==
- Jim (disambiguation)
- Gym (disambiguation)
