= StuStaCulum =

Student theatre festival in Munich, Germany

Coordinates: 48°11′02″N 11°36′42″E

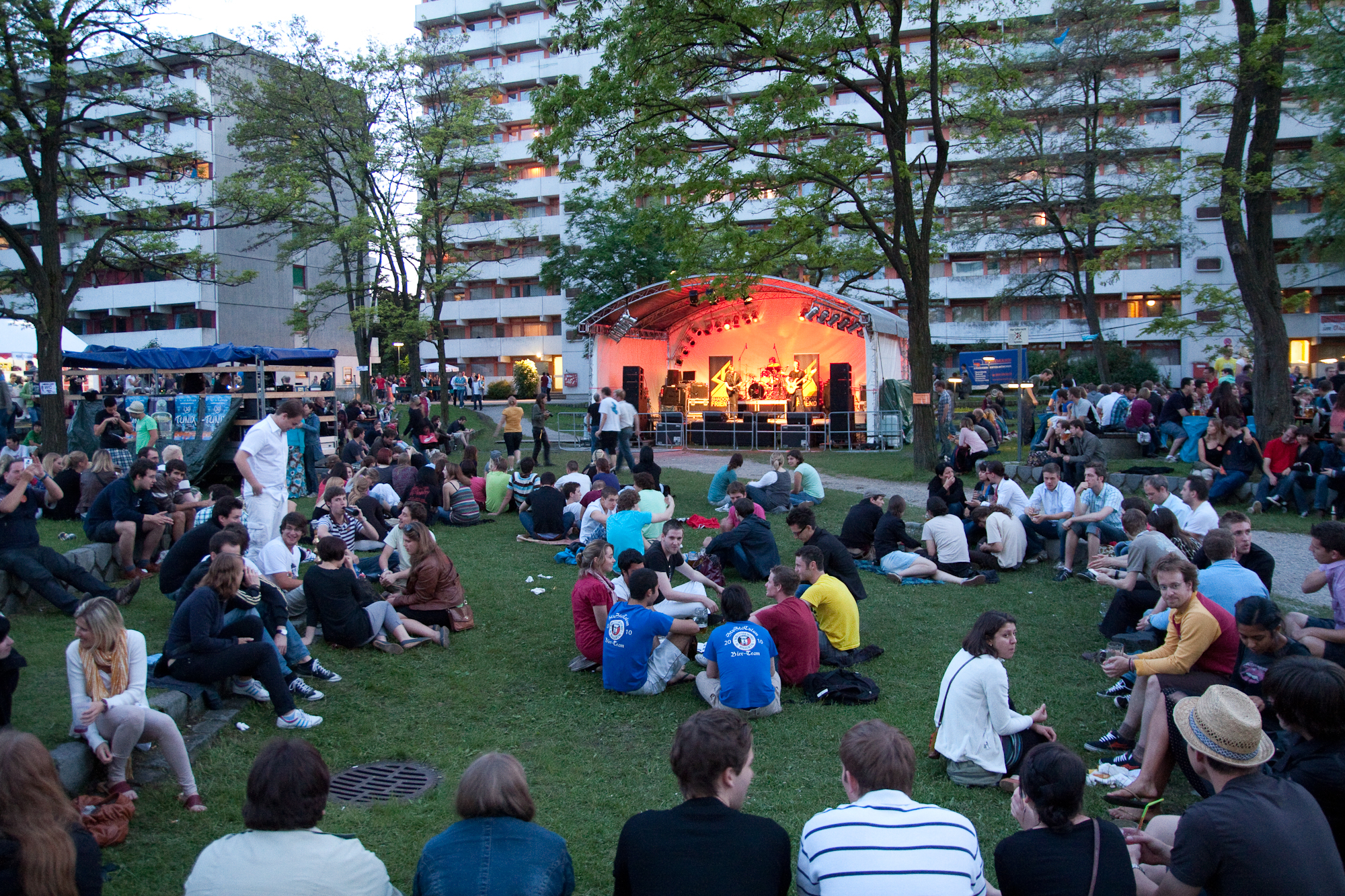
Stustaculum 2010

StuStaCulum (Acronym for StudentenStadt-SpectraCulum) is an annual theatre festival at the Studentenstadt in Munich, Germany, organized by student volunteers who live in the Studentenstadt.

The festival began in 1989, though was cancelled in 2020 and 2021 due to the COVID-19 pandemic.

== Description ==
StuStaCulum began as a small festival with two bands and twelve theatre groups for the 25th anniversary of Studentenstadt, developing into a festival with over 100 scheduled events and 30,000 visitors. Over 70 bands were announced for the 2022 festival. The performers do not receive payment.

The events throughout the festival range from concerts to theater performances to rugby and football tournaments. The festival also includes various food/drink trucks and tents.

Since 2003, StuStaCulum has collaborated with GARNIX and TUNIX, festivals run by students from the Technical University of Munich, and since 2010, the Uni-Sommerfest (University Summer Festival) of LMU Munich. The three festivals are promoted together under the motto "Triple Live Summer".

In 2023, the festival introduced "StuStaPay", the "erste Open-Source-Festival-Bezahlsystem" (first open source festival payment system).
