= James Hart =

James Hart may refer to:

== Entertainment ==
- James McDougal Hart (1828–1901), Scottish-American painter
- James Hart (artist) (fl. 1940s and 1950s), British illustrator
- James V. Hart (born 1950), American screenwriter
- James Hart (vocalist) (born 1979), American singer for the metal band Eighteen Visions

== Politics ==
- James Hart (Ontario politician) (1820–1898), Canadian politician
- James Hart (Australian politician) (1825–1873), New South Wales politician
- James L. Hart (born 1944), American political candidate in Tennessee
- James P. Hart (1904–1987), Justice of the Supreme Court of Texas

== Sports ==
- Hub Hart (James Henry Hart; 1878–1960), American baseball player and football coach
- James Hart (rugby union) (born 1991), Irish rugby union player
- Jim Hart (manager) (James Abner Hart; 1855–1919), American baseball manager
- Jimmy Hart (baseball) (James John Hart; 1875–1926), American baseball player

== Other ==
- James Hart (physician) (fl. 1633), English physician and medical writer
- James Morgan Hart (1839–1916), American English professor and philologist
- James D. Hart (1911–1990), American English professor at University of California, Berkeley
- James Hart (police officer) (1947–2024), British police commissioner
- James Hart, protagonist of the 1970 novel The Paper Chase, its 1973 film adaptation and the subsequent TV series
- James Hart (minister) (1663–1729), minister of Greyfriars Kirk in Edinburgh

== See also ==
- James Hart Wyld (1913–1953), American engineer
- Jamie Hart (disambiguation)
- Jim Hart (disambiguation)
