= No. 28 Squadron RAF =

Flying squadron of the Royal Air Force

No. 28 (AC) Squadron RAF
- Squadron badge
- Active: 1915–1918 (RFC); 1918–1920; 1920; 1967; 1968–1997; 2001–present
- Country: United Kingdom
- Branch: Royal Air Force
- Type: Operational Conversion Unit
- Role: Support helicopter training
- Part of: Joint Aviation Command
- Station: RAF Benson
- Mottos: Quicquid agas age (Latin for 'Whatsoever you may do, do')
- Aircraft: Boeing Chinook HC5,6,6A

Insignia
- Post-1950 roundel

No. 28 Squadron, also known as No. 28 (Army Co-operation) Squadron, is a squadron of the Royal Air Force. Based at RAF Benson, it serves as the RAF's operational conversion unit for the Boeing Chinook HC5/6/6A helicopter.

== History ==
=== First World War (1915–1918) ===
No. 28 Squadron formed on 7 November 1915 as part of the Royal Flying Corps at Fort Grange, Gosport. Initially it was a training squadron equipped with a variety of different aircraft, although in June 1916, it was also recorded as having home defence duties, for which it flew the Royal Aircraft Factory B.E.12, although it lost this role in July that year. On 9 June, part of the squadron was split to form the nucleus of the new No. 56 Squadron. In July 1917, No. 28 Squadron moved to Yatesbury in Wiltshire for conversion to the fighter role, receiving the Sopwith Camel from September 1917.

The squadron moved to France on 8 October 1917, and flew its first operational sortie on 20 October, during the Battle of Passchendaele, when nineteen of the squadron's aircraft provided cover during an attack by Camels of No. 70 Squadron on a German airfield at Rumbeke, Belgium, with No. 28 Squadron claiming three German aircraft shot down. On 26 October, as a result of the Austro-German offensive against Italy at the Battle of Caporetto, the British government agreed to send troops and aircraft to reinforce the Italians, and No. 28 Squadron was one of the squadrons ordered to Italy, arriving at Milan by rail on 12 November, with its aircraft uncrated and reassembled by 14 November. The squadron's aircraft flew escort missions for army cooperation patrols over the front lines, as well as for longer-range strategic reconnaissance missions and for bombing raids.

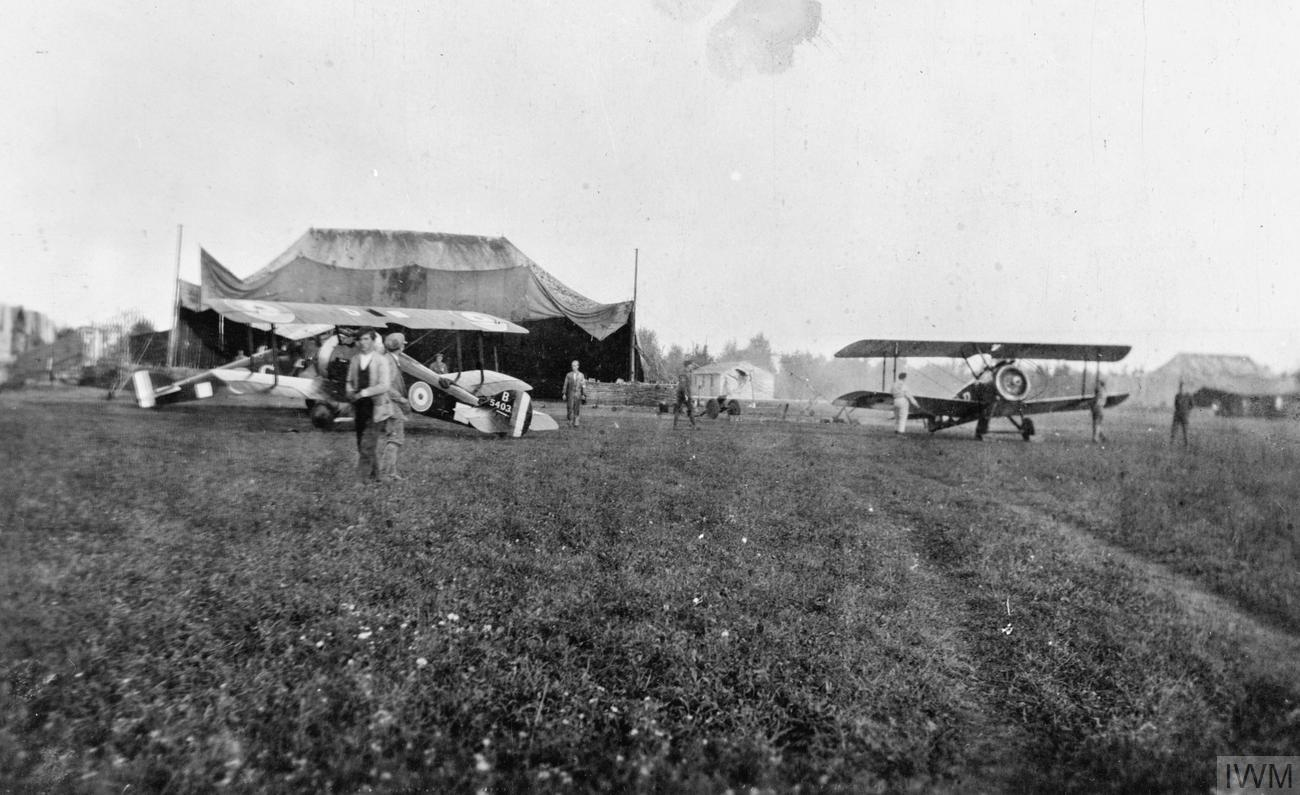
Sopwith Camels of No. 28 Squadron being prepared for a patrol on the Italian Front during the First World War

From February 1918, the squadron added attacks against enemy airfields to its duties, and in March, a flight of Bristol F.2 Fighters was attached to the squadron for long-range reconnaissance, although they were soon passed in to No. 34 Squadron. On 1 April 1918, No. 28 Squadron became part of the newly established Royal Air Force. On 15 June 1918, Austria-Hungary launched a major offensive on the Italian front. As the weather on the sector of the front (on the Asiago plateau) held by British troops was too poor for air power to be useful, the RAF squadrons' efforts were diverted to help the Italians on the Piave front, where Austro-Hungarian forces had crossed the River Piave. All available British aircraft were employed against the Austro-Hungarian forces, and in particular against the crossings over the Piave, and when the offensive had been stopped, against the retreating Austro-Hungarian troops. On 27 October 1918, the Italians launched their final, successful, offensive of the war, at the Battle of Vittorio Veneto. RAF squadrons, including No. 28 Squadron, were employed in attacking the retreating Austro-Hungarian troops until the Armistice of Villa Giusti ended the fighting on 4 November.

By the end of the First World War, the squadron had claimed 111 enemy aircraft destroyed, with a further 24 driven down out of control. It numbered eleven flying aces among its ranks, with future Air Vice-Marshal Clifford MacKay McEwen, with 27 claims, being the squadron's leading scorer. Other aces included William George Barker (who claimed 22 of his total of 50 while with the squadron), Harold B. Hudson, James Hart Mitchell, Stanley Stanger, Arthur Cooper, Percy Wilson, Thomas Frederic Williams, and Joseph E. Hallonquist.

=== Inter-war years (1919–1938) ===
No. 28 Squadron returned to Britain in February 1919, first to its old home at Yatesbury, then to Leighterton in Gloucestershire and to Eastleigh in Hampshire in October 1919. It was disbanded on 20 January 1920 at Eastleigh. On 1 April 1920, however, it was reformed at RAF Ambala in Northern India by renumbering No. 114 Squadron, an army cooperation squadron equipped with the Bristol F.2b Fighter. (Note: It may have also retained some Royal Aircraft Factory B.E.2s, although if operated, they were soon phased out.) The squadron operated over the North-West Frontier, moving to Kohat in December 1921. While the squadron had an authorised establishment of twelve aircraft, the actual number of aircraft possessed by the squadron was usually considerably less, with the squadron recorded as having seven aircraft on 30 June 1922. Serviceability of the RAF's India-based aircraft was also poor, with many of the aircraft old and worn out. In an August 1922 report on the state of the RAF in India Air Vice Marshall John Salmond noted that of an authorised establishment of seventy aircraft in India, only seven were operational, with aircraft flying without equipment essential to safety, and concluded that "...the Royal Air Force in India is to all intents and purposes non-existent as a fighting force at this date."

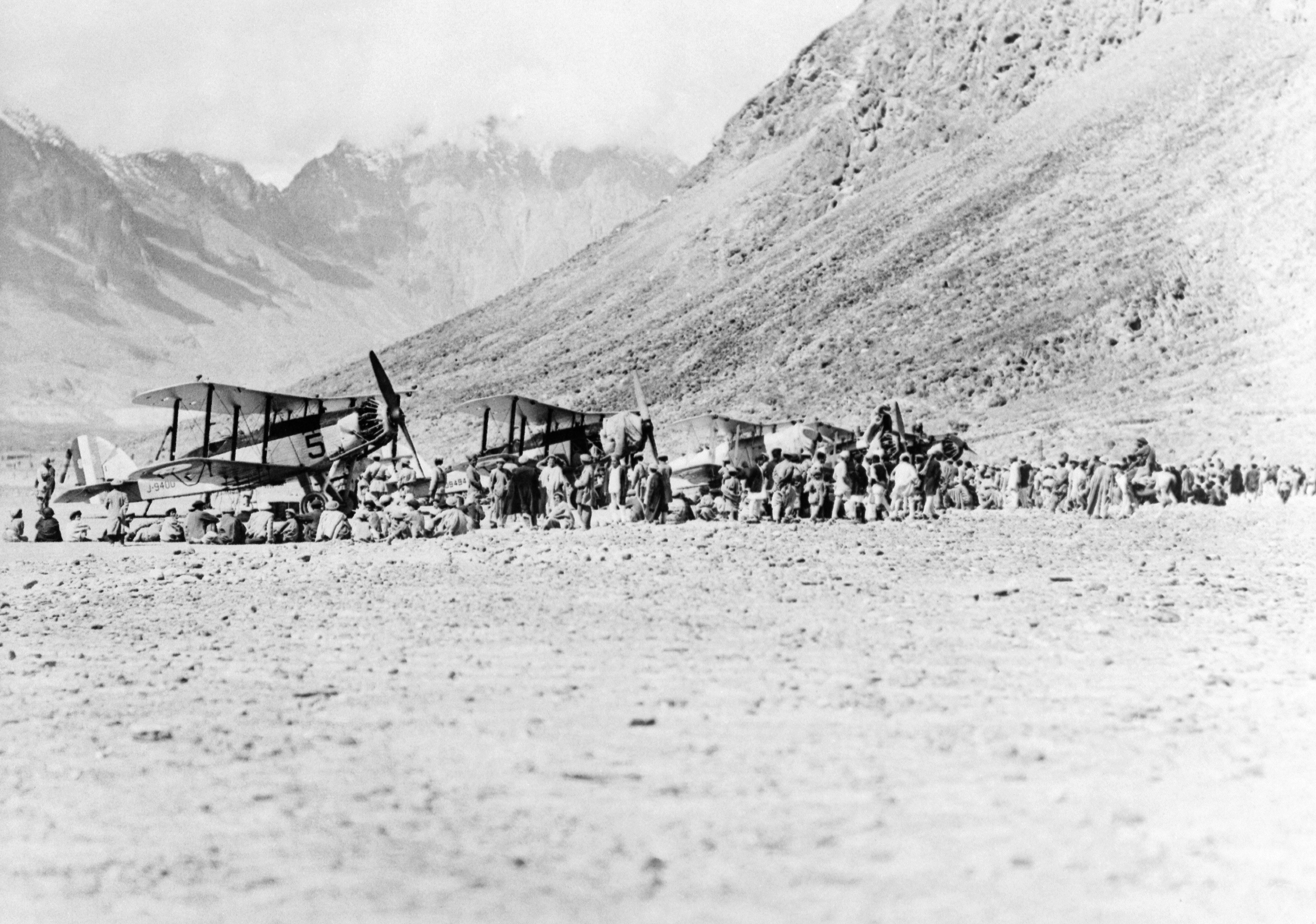
Westland Wapitis of No. 28 Squadron operating from a barren airfield at Gilgit, Kashmir, one of the British militaries' most remote outposts between the wars

In April 1923, the squadron moved to Peshawar, with a detachment at Tank, and in January 1925, moved to RAF Quetta. As well as its normal duties, the squadron operated an experimental air mail service from Quetta to Shimla in 1925. In January 1927, the squadron returned to Ambala, where it remained based for the next ten years. In September 1931, the squadron replaced its Bristol Fighters with Westland Wapitis. The squadron flew relief flights into Quetta after the city had been devastated by an earthquake on 31 May 1935. The squadron re-equipped again with the Hawker Audax during June 1936. In April 1937, the squadron was forward deployed to Manzai in response to an uprising by supporters of Mitza Ali Khan in Waziristan. The squadron returned to Ambala in July 1937, although it continued to maintain detachments at RAF Miranshah. It moved to Kohat in March 1939.

=== Second World War (1939–1945) ===
No. 28 Squadron remained at Kohat, on the outbreak of the Second World War in Europe. It re-equipped with the Westland Lysander monoplane in September 1941. In early January 1942, as a response to the Japanese invasion of Burma, two of the squadron's Lysanders were sent to Port Blair in the Andaman Islands, with the remainder of the squadron preparing to move to Burma. Nineteen Lysanders reached Lashio in the Shan States on 26 January, with the squadron, together with the similarly equipped No. 1 Squadron, Indian Air Force, moved forward to Taungoo, and being fitted with racks to carry 250 lb (110 kg) bombs for direct support of the army. On 2 February 1942, two Lysanders set out from Mingaladon carrying Lieutenant-General Thomas Hutton, General Officer Commanding Burma Command and his aide to Lashio, in the first part of Hutton's planned journey to Chongqing to meet Chinese leader Chiang Kai-shek. The two aircraft became lost however and the Lysander carrying Hutton crashed and caught fire. While Hutton managed to escape the burning aircraft, the pilot, Flight Lieutenant E. W. Tate was badly injured and Hutton was unable to free him, with Tate dying from his wounds six days later. The squadron's Lysanders carried out a number of bombing attacks against Japanese-held airfields, rail targets, river traffic and troops, but losses were heavy, and the squadron was ordered to withdraw back to India on 17 February, leaving a detachment of three Lysanders behind in Burma. The two aircraft detached to the Andaman Islands were destroyed by their crews on 18 February before the detachment evacuated the Andamans, while the surviving two aircraft of the Burma-based detachment were evacuated to India on 26 February.

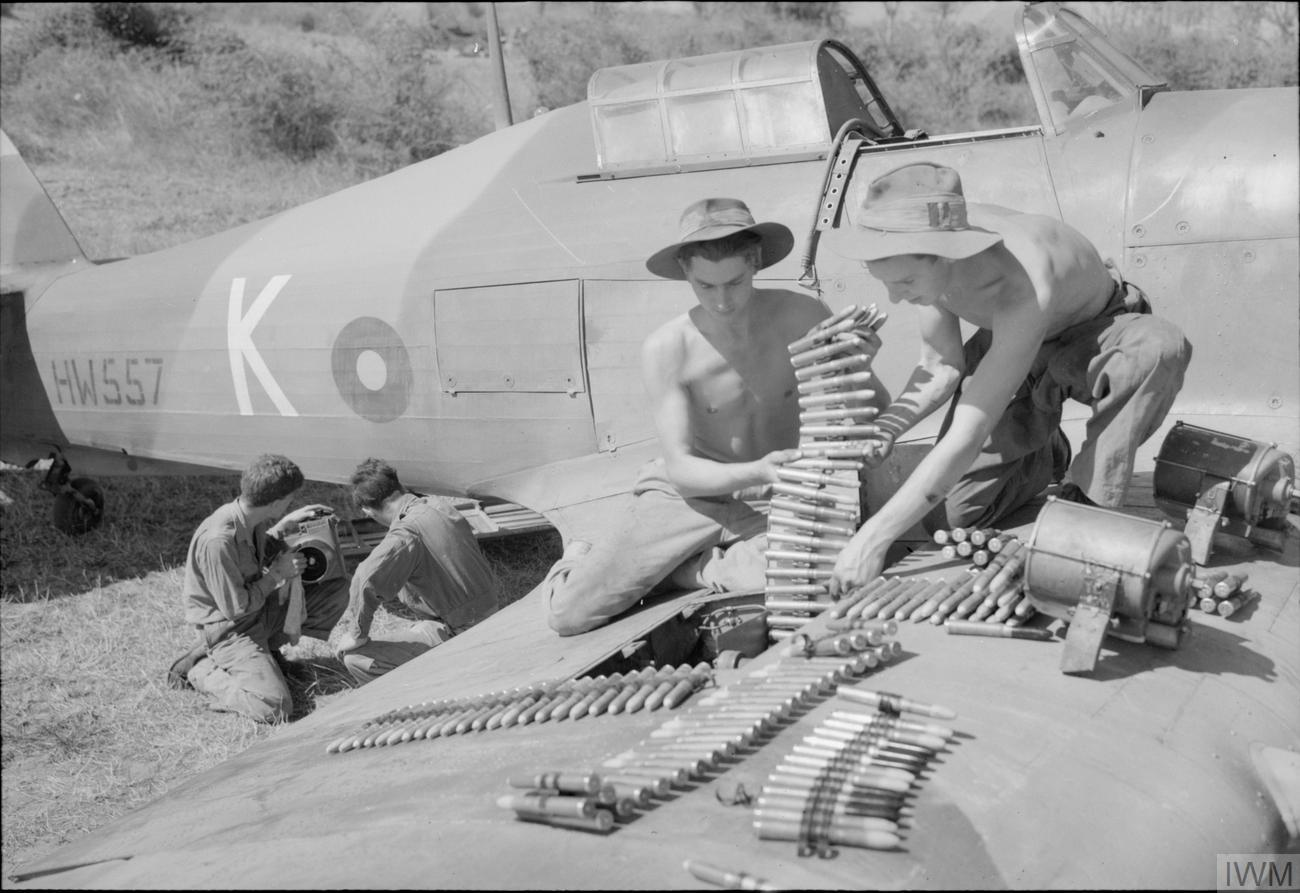
A No. 28 Squadron Hawker Hurricane Mk.IIC being armed, 1943

In March 1942, the squadron had moved to Lahore to rebuild its strength, but in April it moved to Ranchi, in North-East India. In July, the squadron moved to its old base at Kohat for operations over the North-West Frontier, supporting operations by a mobile column of the Indian Army against followers of Mitza Ali Khan, who had cut the road between Miramshah and Datta Khel. Following the successful relief of Datta Khel and the dispersal of the rebels, the squadron returned to Ranchi in August. In December 1942 it was re-equipped with Hawker Hurricane Mk.IIB aircraft in the fighter-reconnaissance role. By January 1943, the squadron was operating over Burma, with detachments at Maungdaw and Imphal. The Maungdaw-based detachment moved to Ramu, Cox's Bazar in April and to Cox's Bazar in May 1943. Operations included both tactical reconnaissance and high-level photo reconnaissance, together with offensive patrols against Japanese river traffic. The squadron flew at least 100 operational sorties per month throughout 1943, including during the Monsoon season.

In March 1944, the squadron began to replace the machine-gun armed Hurricane II.B with the cannon-armed Hurricane II.C, while the squadron's operational tempo picked up in the early part of the year, reaching 12 sorties per day in March, while in April it supplemented its normal duties with carrying mail between Dimapur and besieged Imphal during the Battles of Imphal and Kohima. The squadron was pulled out of the front line in July 1944, returning to operations over Burma in December that year. In May 1945, it started to receive the Hurricane Mk.IVs to supplement the II.C. On 1 August 1945, the squadron received three PR.XI variants of the Supermarine Spitfire, flying a few sorties with them before the end of the war.

=== Cold War (1946–1990s) ===
After the end of the Second World War the squadron continued as a fighter-reconnaissance unit as part of the Far East Air Force. In October 1945, the squadron replaced its Hurricanes with the Mk.VIII and Mk. XIVe variants of the Spitfires, concentrating on the Spitfire Mk.XIVe by the end of the year. The squadron moved to Penang, Malaya in November 1945 and to RAF Kuala Lumpur in April 1946, and then to RAF Tengah, Singapore in February 1947. The squadron received the Spitfire FR.18 in 1947. In January 1948, six of the squadron's Spitfires took part in Operation Snapdragon, an experimental deployment to Hong Kong, to test the ability to reinforce the colony in an emergency. They flew via Kuching, Sarawak, Labuan in Malaysia and Clark Field in the Philippines, arriving at Hong Kong after two days, flying 2,305 miles (3,710 km).

The squadron moved to RAF Sembawang, also in Singapore in February 1949. It moved to RAF Kai Tak, Hong Kong in 1949 still with Spitfires, to strengthen Hong Kong's defences as a result of the ongoing Chinese Civil War, with the squadron's role changing from fighter-reconnaissance to pure fighter. The squadron was regularly moved between Kai Tak and RAF Sek Kong. In February 1951, the squadron was re-equipped with jet aircraft, as the de Havilland Vampire FB.5 replaced the Spitfires, with No. 28 Squadron being the last front-line RAF squadron equipped with the Spitfire. From February 1952, it began receiving the Vampire FB.9, which was fitted with air-conditioning, which made operations in the hot climate of Hong Kong more tolerable for pilots. In February 1956, the squadron discarded its Vampires, again being the last front-line RAF squadron to operate the type, receiving the de Havilland Venom FB.1 as replacement, exchanging them for the Venom FB.4 in November 1959.

In June 1957, as a result of the 1957 Defence Review, Sek Kong was handed over the army, with No. 28 Squadron returning to Kai Tak. While at Kai Tak from May 1962 the squadron requipped with the Hawker Hunter FGA.9, until 2 January 1967 when it was disbanded.

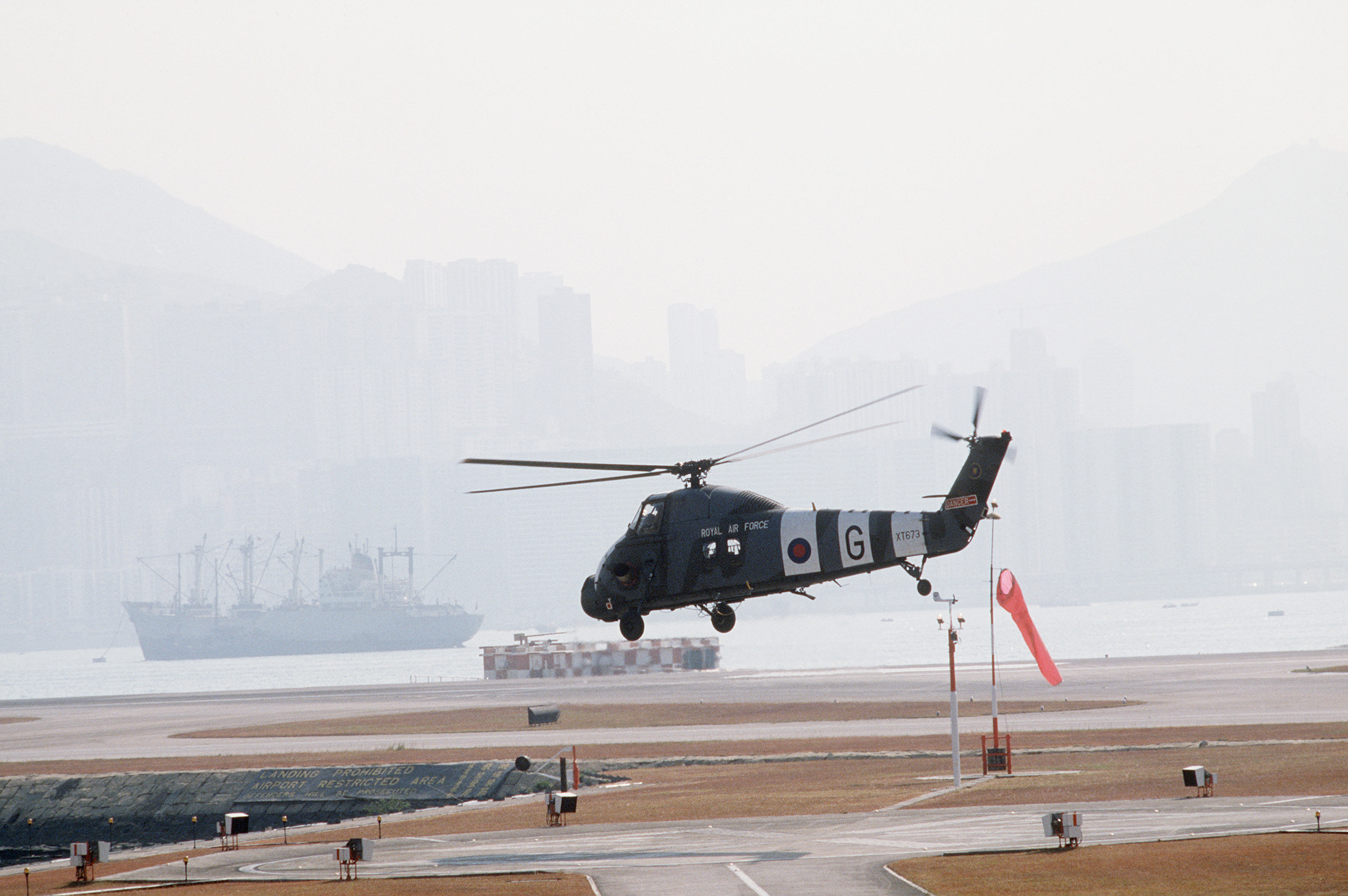
A No. 28 Squadron Westland Wessex HC.2 takes off at Hong Kong in 1983

On 17 May 1978, the squadron moved to RAF Sek Kong where it operated from until 1 November 1996. It returned to Kai Tak and remained there until it disbanded on 3 June 1997, shortly before the handover of Hong Kong from the UK to the People's Republic of China on 1 July. The Wessexes were sold to Uruguay and it was the last RAF squadron to leave the territory.

=== 21st century (2000–present) ===
The RAF ordered twenty-two Westland Merlin HC3 multi-role helicopters in March 1995, the first of which was received on 7 March 2001. The squadron officially reformed on 17 July 2001 at RAF Benson in Oxfordshire, the first time in its recent history that the squadron had been stationed in the UK.

The squadron's first operational role with the Merlin was in support of the Stabilisation Force (SFOR), a NATO-led multinational peacekeeping force in Bosnia and Herzegovina. The aircraft and personnel deployed to Banja Luka on 1 April 2003, the same day that an initial operational capability was declared for the Merlin. The detachment ceased on 31 March 2004 and the squadron then began to prepare for operations in Iraq.

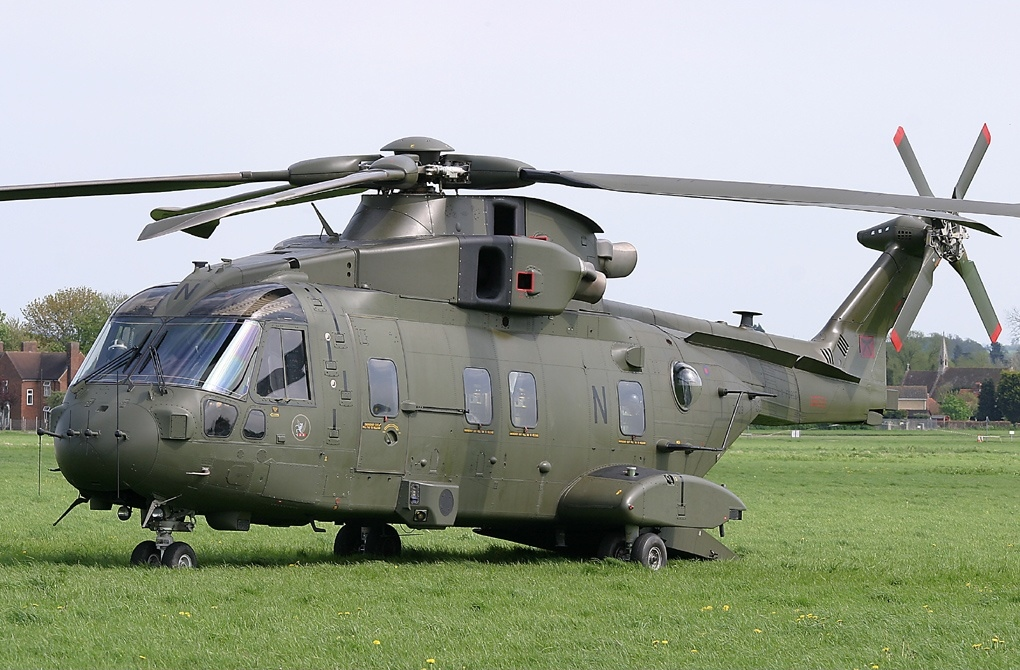
An AgustaWestland HC.3 of No. 28 Squadron in 2005

The squadron's commitment to Operation Telic in Iraq began on 1 March 2005. Several aircraft and a mix of aircrew, engineers and support personnel from the squadron and RAF Benson, deployed as No. 1419 Flight, to replace the Boeing Chinooks of No. 1310 Flight at Basrah Air Station, Iraq.

Sarah-Jayne Mulvihill

In May 2006, five members of a flight crew, including Sarah-Jayne Mulvihill, a 32-year-old flight-lieutenant from No. 28 Squadron, died when their Westland Lynx helicopter was shot down over Basra in southern Iraq. Mulvihill was the first British servicewoman to be killed in action for more than 20 years.

In July 2015, the squadron handed over its Merlins to the Fleet Air Arm's 845 Naval Air Squadron and re-roled as No. 28 (Reserve) Squadron, the operational conversion unit with responsibility for training Chinook HC.4 and Westland Puma HC.2 helicopters crews.

On 1 February 2018, the RAF rescinded all (Reserve) suffixes leading to No. 28 (Reserve) Squadron becoming No. 28 Squadron.

In March 2020, the squadron was awarded the right to emblazon a battle honour on its squadron standard, recognising its role in the War in Afghanistan between 2001 and 2014.

On 28 October 2021, No. 28 Squadron was re-awarded its historical designation of No. 28 (Army Co-operation) Squadron.

The Puma HC.2 was retired from service in March 2025.

== Heritage ==
The squadron's heraldic badge features in front of a demi-Pegasus, a fasces. The demi-Pegasus represents the white horse on the Wiltshire downs near Yatesbury, where the squadron was based when it became a frontline unit. The fasces, an emblem of authority since ancient Roman times Fasces, commemorates service in Italy during the First World War. The badge was approved by King Edward VIII in October 1936.

The squadron's motto is Quicquid agas age (Latin for 'Whatsoever you may do, do').

== Battle honours ==
No. 28 Squadron has received the following battle honours. All except North West Frontier (1939), Waziristan (1921–1925) and Iraq (2003–2011) may be emblazoned on the squadron standard.

- Italian Front and Adriatic (1917–1918)
- Piave (1917–1918)
- Vittorio Veneto (1917–1918)
- Waziristan (1921–1925)
- North West Frontier (1939)
- Burma (1942)
- Arakan (1943–1944)
- Manipur (1944)
- Burma (1944–1945)
- Iraq (2003–2011)
- Afghanistan (2001–2014)

== See also ==
- List of Royal Air Force aircraft squadrons
