= Jim Roth =

Jim Roth may refer to:

- Jim Roth (politician) (born 1968), American politician from Oklahoma
- Jim Roth (musician) (born 1962), American guitarist, singer and songwriter
- Jim Roth (businessman), businessman, social entrepreneur and author
