= James French =

James or Jim French may refer to:

== Arts and entertainment ==
- Jim French (radio host) (1928–2017), American radio host
- Jim French (photographer) (1932–2017), American photographer
- Jim French (musician) (born 1954), American jazz musician

== Law and politics ==
- James Strange French (1807–1886), American lawyer
- James M. French (1834–1916), American politician in Virginia
- James B. French (1857–1932), American politician in Wisconsin

== Sports ==
- Jim French (footballer, born 1907) (1907–?), Scottish footballer
- Jim French (footballer, born 1926) (1926–2004), English footballer
- Jim French (baseball) (born 1941), American baseball player
- James French (racing driver) (born 1992), American racing driver
- James French (rugby union) (born 1998), Irish rugby union player

== Others ==
- Jim French (cowboy) (fl. 1870s), New Mexican cowboy
- James Bruce French (1921–2002), Canadian-American theoretical physicist
- James French (murderer) (c. 1936–1966), American criminal
- Jim French (businessman) (born 1953), British airline executive
- James R. French, (died 2023), American aerospace engineer

== Other uses ==
- Jim French (horse), American thoroughbred racehorse
