= Jimmy Nelson =

Jimmy Nelson may refer to:

== Sports ==
- Jimmy Nelson (footballer) (1901–1965), Scottish international footballer
- Jimmy Nelson (rugby union, born 1903) (1903–1981), Scotland international rugby union player
- Jimmy Nelson (American football) (1919–1986), American football player
- Jimmy Nelson (rugby union, born 1921) (1921–2014), Irish rugby union international
- Jimmy Nelson (baseball) (born 1989), American baseball player

== Other ==
- Jimmy Nelson (singer) (1919–2007), American blues singer
- Jimmy Nelson (ventriloquist) (1928–2019), American ventriloquist
- Jimmy Nelson (photographer) (born 1967), British photo-journalist

== See also ==
- Jim Nelson (disambiguation)
- James Nelson (disambiguation)
