= Jamie Mitchell (disambiguation) =

Jamie Mitchell may refer to:

- Jamie Mitchell, a fictional character from the BBC soap opera Eastenders, played by Jack Ryder
- Jamie Mitchell (footballer), Scottish former footballer
- Jamie Mitchell (boxer), American boxer
- Jamie Mitchell, musician in Vengeance Rising and Scaterd Few
- Jamie Mitchell (director) of The Land Before Time XIII: The Wisdom of Friends

== See also ==
- James Mitchell (disambiguation)
