= Cooper Firearms of Montana =

American firearms company

Cooper Firearms of Montana, Inc.
- Type: Private
- Industry: Firearms
- Founded: 1990; 36 years ago
- Headquarters: Stevensville, Montana
- Key people: Dan Cooper, Founder
- Products: Firearms, weapon
- Revenue: unknown
- Number of employees: 38
- Website: www.cooperfirearms.com

Cooper Firearms of Montana was founded in 1990 by Dan Cooper and two other former Kimber of Oregon employees.

== History ==
Cooper was created to build affordable custom-quality accurate rifles. As they put it "Rifles should shoot as well as they look and vice versa". All Cooper rifles carry an accuracy guarantee. The guarantee for rimfires is 5 shots in .25 in (6.4 mm) at 50 yards (46 m), while for centerfires it is 3 shots in .5 in (13 mm) at 100 yards (91 m).

Rifles are built mostly for hunting, with an emphasis on varmint hunting. As such, a wide variety of calibers is supported, including many common and popular wildcat rounds.

Cooper has achieved a reputation for high-quality accurate rifles. Gun writers have noted that the rifles are both good-looking and well-built as well as accurate.

In 1993 Cooper created their first single-shot rifle in .223 Remington. This rifle later became their Model 21. In 2005 they made their first rifles that had synthetic stocks. Previously all rifles had wood in a variety of grades. In 2007 the first Cooper repeater (non single-shot) rifle was created - the Model 52.

== Models ==
Rifles center on a few particular actions. In 2007 a centerfire repeater (Model 52) was added in a few calibers.

- Model 7 (discontinued) - falling block action chambered in hornet and 223-based calibers. Less than 40 exist, and is considered the rarest of Cooper rifles.
- Model 16 (discontinued) - single shot action for cartridges based on the WSSM family, as well as 6 mm BR and 6 mm PPC.
- Model 21 - single shot bolt action for cartridges in the .223 Remington family.
- Model 22 - single shot bolt action for cartridges in the .308 Winchester and family and similar.
- Model 38 (discontinued) - single shot bolt action for cartridges based on the .22 Hornet and similar.
- Model 40 (discontinued) - repeating bolt action for cartridges based on the .22 Hornet and similar.
- Model 52 - repeating bolt action for cartridges in the .30-06 Springfield as well as belted magnum families.
- Model 54 - repeating bolt action for cartridges in the .308 Winchester family.
- Model 56 (discontinued) - repeating bolt action for cartridges in the .300 Winchester Magnum family.
- Model 57-M - repeating bolt action for rimfire cartridges.
- Model 51 - repeating bolt action for cartridges in the .223 Remington family.

== Political donation controversy ==
On October 27, 2008 a USA Today article featuring executives supporting Barack Obama for president was published naming Dan Cooper as a financial supporter of the campaign. Scandal soon erupted across gun-related web forums and blogs when it was made public that Dan Cooper supported a pro-gun control Presidential candidate and had donated several thousand dollars to his campaign. Gun owners and blogs reacted to the news calling for a boycott of his company.

By October 28, 2008 Cooper Firearms released a message on their website, noting that the company itself had not contributed in any fashion, and clarifying Cooper's contributions.

On October 29, 2008 Cooper Firearms updated the message on their website indicating the board of directors asked Dan Cooper to step down as CEO of the company. In an October 30, 2008 article from USA Today Dan Cooper confirmed that he did indeed resign as CEO.

== See also ==
- Jim Zumbo
