= Junior Year in Munich =

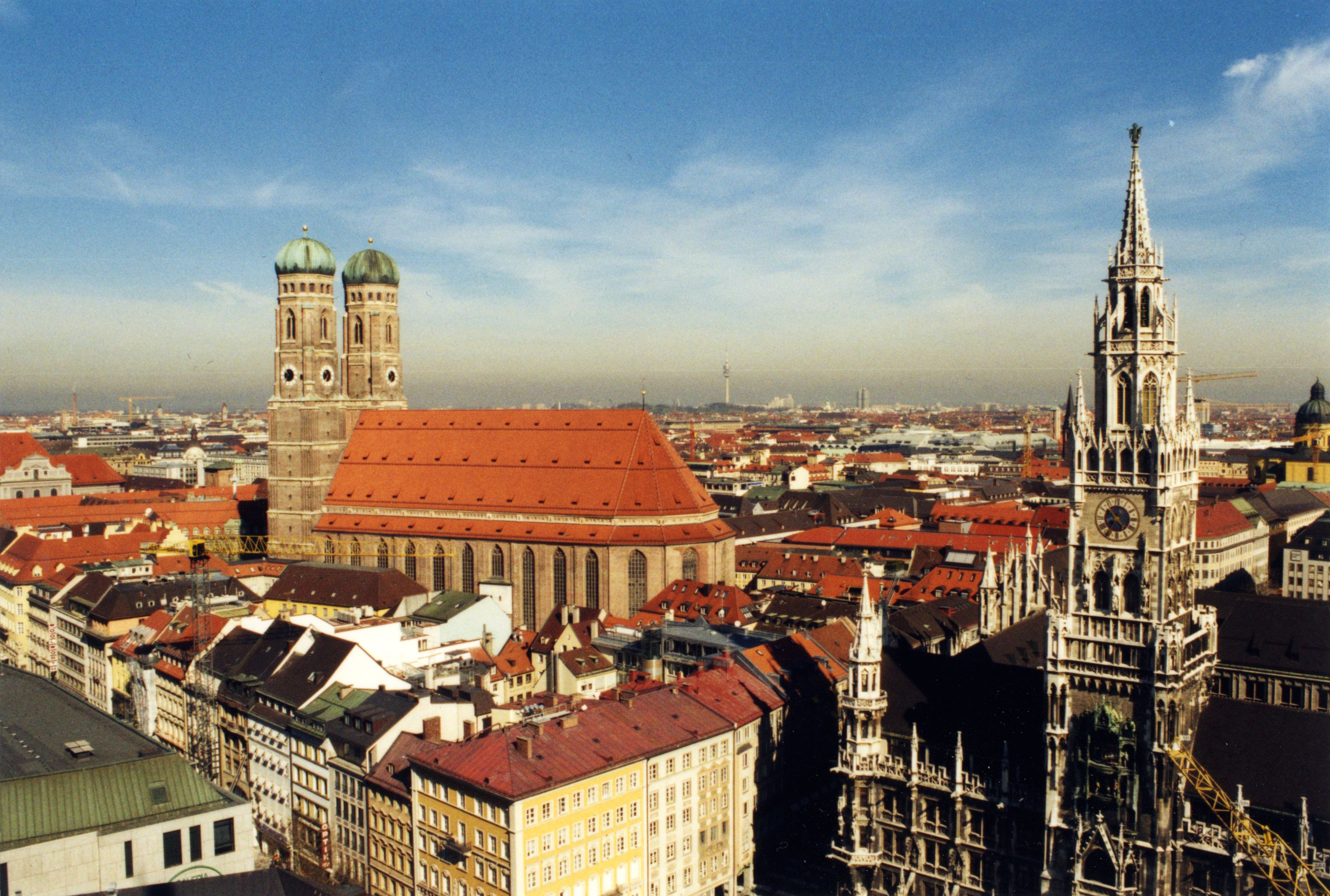
Munich Skyline at Marienplatz

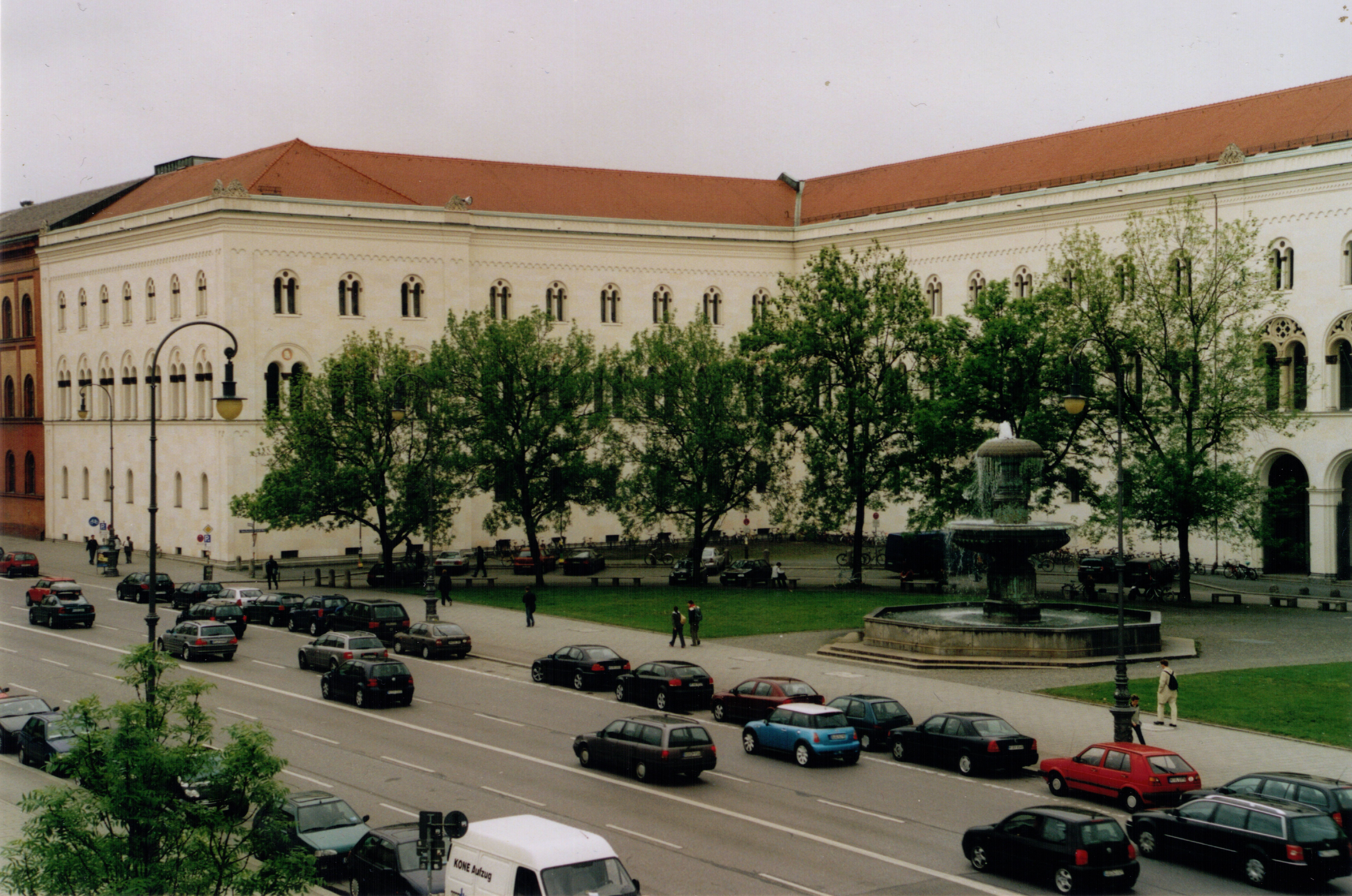
Main building of LMU Munich

Junior Year in Munich (JYM) is a study abroad program for US undergraduate students sponsored by Wayne State University in Detroit, Michigan, in formal affiliation with LMU Munich.

Originally established 1931 as an extension of the University of Delaware Foreign Study Plan, the Junior Year in Munich program was reopened in 1953 by Wayne State University as the first junior year abroad program for US undergraduates in postwar Germany.

By December 1966, Wayne State University President William Keast had visited Germany (and Poland) to gain first-hand knowledge of the University's two Junior Year Abroad programs, one at LMU Munich, and the other at the University of Freiburg. He spoke with the directors of these two universities, as well as those at the University of Bonn and the Free University of Berlin, to explore the possibility of joint exchange programs with Wayne State University. President Keast reported that both programs were running effectively, and that "they enjoy the confidence and esteem of the German professors and administrators who are involved in them." The program by LMU Munich, run exclusively by Wayne State University, reported 82 American students, from all over the U.S. (including Alaska and Hawaii) in residence. Attending courses entirely in German (and those available to German students as well) in their major field of study at Wayne, Keast reported that LMU Munich's responses to the program had been favorable, and that up to 100 spaces had been authorized in Munich for students from the program.

President Keast also noted that Wayne State University's student representation in the program was low, due largely to the expense to students. Although a scholarship program supported some students who excelled but could not afford to participate in the program, enlargement of those scholarship funds was desirable to increase the opportunities for Wayne State students.

In 1967 the JYM program was approved by the LMU Munich Academic Senate as an affiliated academic institute, and was conferred the title “Junior Year in Munich an der Universität München” by LMU Munich in 1974 when the Bavarian State Ministry of Culture approved the program as an official course of study (Teil-Studiengang) at the university.

Students are enrolled at LMU Munich where they take coursework related to their degree studies in the US. Additional area studies courses and advanced language instruction are provided by the JYM program. Students are immersed in German language and culture by living alongside other university students in Studentenstadt Freimann.

More than 3500 students from 500 US colleges and universities have participated in the Junior Year in Munich program since 1953. Directing the JYM program today are Christina Weiler Fand (Ph.D. University of Purdue), and two academic coordinators, Barbara Reis (M.A.) and Patrizia Thill (M.A.).
