= Stanley Stanger =

- Born: 10 July 1894; Montreal, Quebec, Canada
- Died: 10 September 1967 (aged 73); Montreal, Quebec, Canada
- Military career
- Allegiance: King George V of the British Empire
- Branch: Canadian Expeditionary Force; Royal Flying Corps
- Rank: Captain
- Nickname: Stan
- Units: No. 66 Squadron RFC, No. 28 Squadron RAF
- Awards: Military Cross, Distinguished Flying Cross

Captain Stanley Stanger was a World War I flying ace credited with 13 confirmed aerial victories scored on the Italian Front. He was also noted for his ingenious escape from being captured by the Austro-Hungarians.

== Entry into service ==
Stanley Stanger was an investment broker when he volunteered in Toronto for the Canadian Expeditionary Force on 21 March 1916. He claimed a year's prior military service in the Westmount Rifles with the rank of Sergeant. His mother Mary was named as his next of kin. He was five feet six inches tall at time of enlistment. He had dark brown hair, brown eyes, and dark complexion.

== Aerial service ==
Stanger was commissioned on 10 May 1917. He joined 66 Squadron in France as a Sopwith Camel pilot on 18 October 1917. Shortly thereafter, the squadron relocated to Italy. At Ormelle on 14 December 1917, Stanger forced down an Albatros D.V out of control for his first victory. He would score twice more with 66 Squadron, destroying two foes a month apart, on 18 March and 17 April 1918. On 27 April 1918, he transferred to 28 Squadron. He shot down opposing two-seater reconnaissance planes on 2, 3, and 13 May, becoming an ace in the process. He continued to score, and by the end of July, he was a double ace. On 23 August 1918, he was wounded in action by anti-aircraft fire. His wounds grounded him until 20 September. On 26 September 1918, he scored his eleventh win, sharing it with Clifford MacKay McEwen. Stanger then destroyed a pair of Albatros D.Vs over the Tagliamento River on 4 October to finish his victories. He ended up with a record of three enemy planes set afire in midair, another nine destroyed while in flight, and one driven down out of control.

Stanger fell ill while he was aloft on one of his October sorties. He landed on a handy airfield and shut down his plane's engine before realizing he had landed on an Austro-Hungarian strip. His only chance to escape any enemy soldiers investigating the racket of an untimely landing was to restart his engine and fly away. The customary method for starting an engine was for a ground crew member to yank the propeller as a lever to crank the engine, while a pilot sat at the controls. Stanger's solution was to remove his boots and chock the landing gear tires with the footwear. He then cranked the prop, started the engine, circled about the rotating blades, clambered into the cockpit, and departed. The fate of the boots is unknown.

== Post World War I ==
Stanger returned to the family business in Canada. He rose to President of that firm, Guardian Trust Company of Montreal, in 1939, and remained in that position until a few months prior to his death.

== Honors and awards ==
Military Cross

Lt. (T./Capt.) Stanley Stanger, R.A.F. For conspicuous gallantry and devotion to; duty in destroying six enemy aeroplanes. He did splendid service.

Distinguished Flying Cross

Lieut. (A./Capt.) Stanley Stanger, M.C. (ITALY)

He has frequently engaged enemy formations .in superior numbers, inflicting heavy casualties. On 4 October he, in company with another machine, engaged six enemy aeroplanes; three of these were destroyed, Captain Stanger accounting for two. In all he has destroyed five enemy machines. (M.C. gazetted 16 September 1918.)
