= Jamie Hart =

Jamie Hart may refer to:

- Jamie Hart (cricketer) (born 1975), English cricketer
- Jamie Hart (Family Affairs), fictional character in the former British soap opera Family Affairs

== See also ==
- James Hart (disambiguation)
