= Jim Williamson (footballer, born January 1909) =

Australian rules footballer, born 1909

Personal information
- Full name: James Williamson
- Born: 11 January 1909
- Died: 21 July 1983 (aged 74)
- Original team: Old Xaverians Football Club

Playing career^{1}
Years	Club	Games (Goals)
1931–32	St Kilda	7 (0)
1933–34	Geelong	2 (0)
Total		9 (0)
- ^{1} Playing statistics correct to the end of 1934.

Jim Williamson (11 January 1909 – 21 July 1983) was an Australian rules footballer who played with the St Kilda and Geelong Football Clubs in the Victorian Football League (VFL).

== Early days ==
Edward James Williamson, known as Jim, played both cricket and football for Old Xaverians, and represented Victoria as an amateur in Aussie Rules in 1929 and on other occasions.

Jim attended a meeting in 1927/28 which resulted in the establishment of the Old Xaverians cricket club. In that year he headed the bowling averages for Old Xaverians, taking 26 wickets at an average of 13.79, and in 1929/30 he again headed the averages, taking 18 at 9.33. He took 4/7 in one match against University.

Jim played for the Old Xaverians football team in 1928. The annual report lists him as a “fine performer”. This was the year that the modern newspapers would describe him as “colourful” - John Wren secured the services of Jock McHale, to coach Old Xaverians. McHale was the Collingwood coach whose teams won eight VFL premierships.

In 1929 Jim won the B J O’Shaunessy Perpetual Trophy for Best and Fairest for the club, and was selected to play for Victorian Amateurs against South Australia.

In the 1930 season Jim had another very good year with the Old Xaverians. He was listed as one of the Big Three, who played great football. In 1931 in a match against Sandringham, Jim “gave his customary dashing exhibition at centre half back and was voted best and fairest on the ground”. Jim was chosen to play in combined C Section teams for the Amateur Competition in both 1930 and 1931.

== Playing career - St Kilda ==
Jim joined the St Kilda football team in the Victorian Football League in 1931. He played his first grade match against South Melbourne on 22 August 1931 – aged 22. He played 6 senior games for the Saints in 1932. He remained an amateur at a time when in the depression years many league footballers had no income other than their match payments.

The St Kilda Football Club website had photos of three of their players from the 1930s. One would think the photos came from cigarette cards of the time:

A Trio of Saints From the 1930s
Follower and half forward Edward Williamson	Full back Stuart King	Utility player Fred Phillips

WD & HO Wills cigarette card 1933

J WILLIAMSON St Kilda

A tall follower and half forward, an excellent mark and accurate kick, he scored a number of goals last season, which was his first in league football

On one occasion Jim went sprawling over the boundary line.

“Kick him in the head” screamed some harridan.

“I’ll kick you in the head” yelled an outraged Chris, his mother.

Jim was once blamed for flattening the champion footballer Hadyn Bunton, but he insisted that he was nowhere near him. On another occasion, he was said to have dealt with Ambrose Palmer. Jim said he would not have been so silly - Palmer was also a professional boxer who was Australian middleweight, light heavyweight and heavyweight champion. More football:

Jim told me that his best asset as a footballer was that he was awkward to get around. He shared one memory of a top Collingwood footballer approaching him at speed around the half back flank. Jim sensed that the other player was going to handball over his head, swerve past and re-gather, so he leaped into the air, grabbed the ball and charged off with it.

== Playing career - Geelong ==
In April 1933 the Argus reported that Jim, “the St Kilda footballer” had been transferred by his employer, the Commonwealth Bank, to Geelong. Since Geelong was too far away for him to continue to play for St Kilda, Jim joined the Geelong football club, and played one game in the seniors for that club in each of 1933 and 1934. His last game of football was on 26 May 1934. Thereafter an injured knee prevented further games, although he was only 24 at the time.

== Commemorative jumpers ==
In 2009 Geelong produced a special heritage edition of its football jumper to celebrate its 150th anniversary. It used that edition of the jumper in a number of AFL games that year. The traditional blue hoops were replaced by lists of past players for the club, printed in blue, and Jim’s name is front and centre on the chest. St Kilda followed suit in 1913 with a 140 year heritage jumper and Jim’s name is on the back. There cannot be many players whose names appear on both jumpers - Gary Sidebottom is another.
