= Jim Nelson =

Jim Nelson may refer to:

- Jim Nelson (hurling manager) (1938–2015), Irish hurling manager
- Jim Nelson (drag racer), competed in the 1962 NHRA Winternationals
- Jim Nelson (baseball) (1947–2004), American baseball pitcher
- Jim Nelson (editor) (born 1963), American editor of GQ magazine
- Jim Nelson (American football) (born 1975), American football linebacker
- Jim Nelson (artist), American role-playing games artist

== See also ==
- Jimmy Nelson (disambiguation)
- James Nelson (disambiguation)
