= Jim Williamson (association footballer) =

English footballer

Personal information
- Full name: Jim Williamson
- Date of birth: 16 June 1926
- Place of birth: Birkenhead, England
- Date of death: 2005 (aged 78–79)
- Place of death: Liverpool, England
- Position: Inside forward

Senior career*
Years	Team	Apps	(Gls)
1946–1947	Tranmere Rovers	4	(3)
- * Club domestic league appearances and goals

Jim Williamson (16 June 1926 – December 2005) was an English footballer, who played as an inside forward in the Football League for Tranmere Rovers.

He died in 2005.
