= Jim Mitchell =

Jim Mitchell may refer to:

== Entertainment ==
- Jim Mitchell (cartoonist) (born 1949), American underground cartoonist
- Jim Mitchell (visual effects artist), American visual effects artist
- Jim Mitchell (1943–2007), San Francisco pornography producer who killed his brother Artie, see Mitchell brothers
- Father James Mitchell (born 1965), also known as Jim Mitchell, American professional wrestling manager

== Sports ==
- Jim Mitchell (defensive lineman) (1948–2026), American football player for the Detroit Lions
- Jim Mitchell (tight end) (1947–2007), American football player for the Atlanta Falcons
- Jim Mitchell (Australian footballer) (1920–1996), Australian footballer for Melbourne
- James Mitchell (footballer, born 1897) (1897–1975), commonly known as Jim Mitchell, English international footballer

== Others ==
- Jim Mitchell (politician) (1946–2002), Irish Fine Gael politician
- James G. Mitchell (born 1943), commonly known as Jim Mitchell, Canadian computer scientist

== See also ==
- James Mitchell (disambiguation)
