= Kailani =

Origin
- Origin: Hawaiian
- Meaning: “ocean” and sky

Kailani is a Hawaiian given name meaning ocean, from Hawaiian kai, and sky from Hawaiian lani.

== Popularity ==
The name is rising in popularity in the United States, where it has ranked among the top 1,000 names for newborn girls since 2013 and among the top 300 names since 2020. Modern Anglicized, phonetic spelling variants such as Kaylani and Kehlani are also well-used in the United States.
