= Jim French (footballer, born 1926) =

English footballer

Personal information
- Full name: James Robert French
- Date of birth: 27 November 1926
- Place of birth: Stockton-on-Tees, England
- Date of death: February 2004 (aged 77)
- Place of death: Stockton on Tees, England
- Position: Inside forward

Senior career*
Years	Team	Apps	(Gls)
–	Middlesbrough	0	(0)
1951–1952	Northampton Town	1	(0)
1953–1955	Darlington	52	(8)
- * Club domestic league appearances and goals

James Robert French (27 November 1926 – February 2004) was an English footballer who made 53 appearances in the Football League playing as an inside forward for Northampton Town and Darlington in the 1950s. He was also on the books of Middlesbrough but never played for them in the League.
