= Studentenstadt =

Student housing complex in Munich, Germany

Coordinates: 48°11′02″N 11°36′42″E

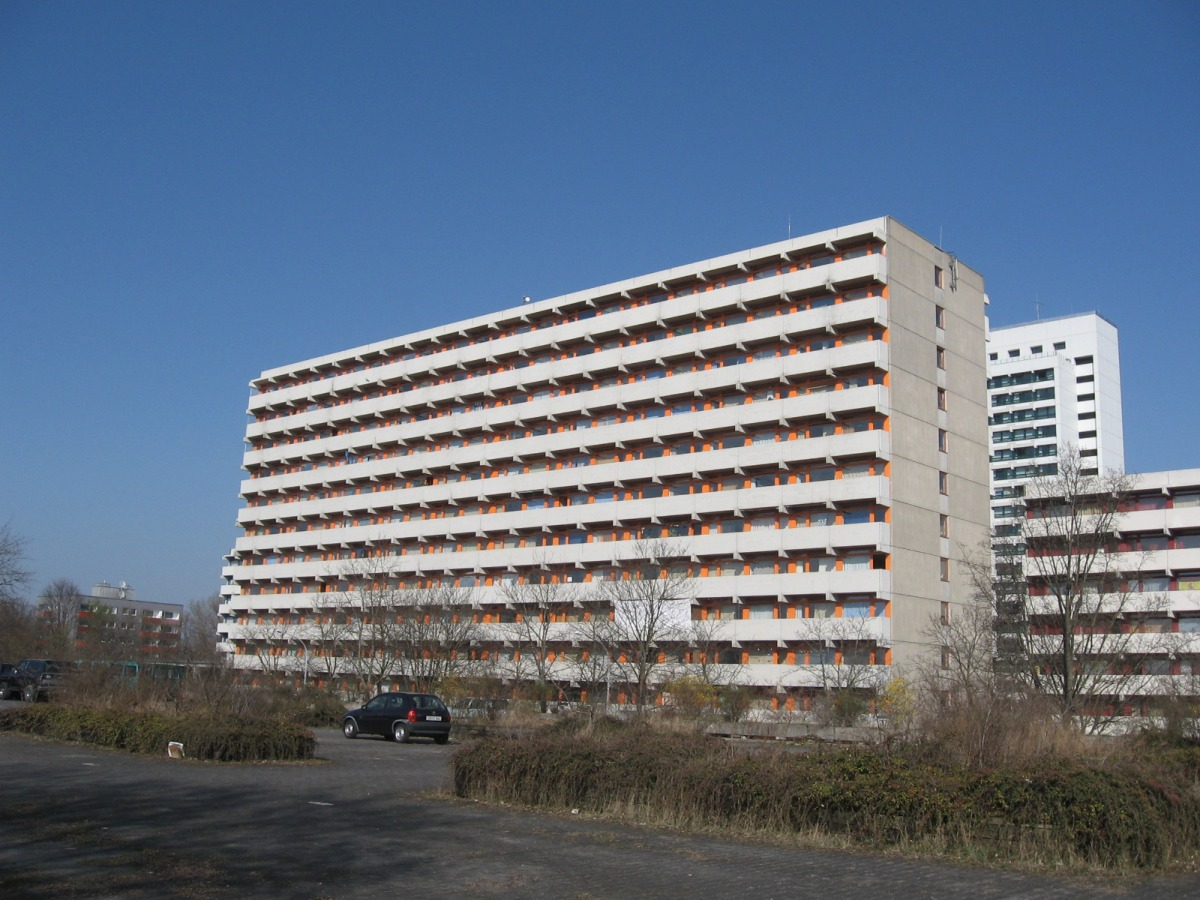
Orange House, on the right side the Red house, in the back the Hanns-Seidel-House (HSH)

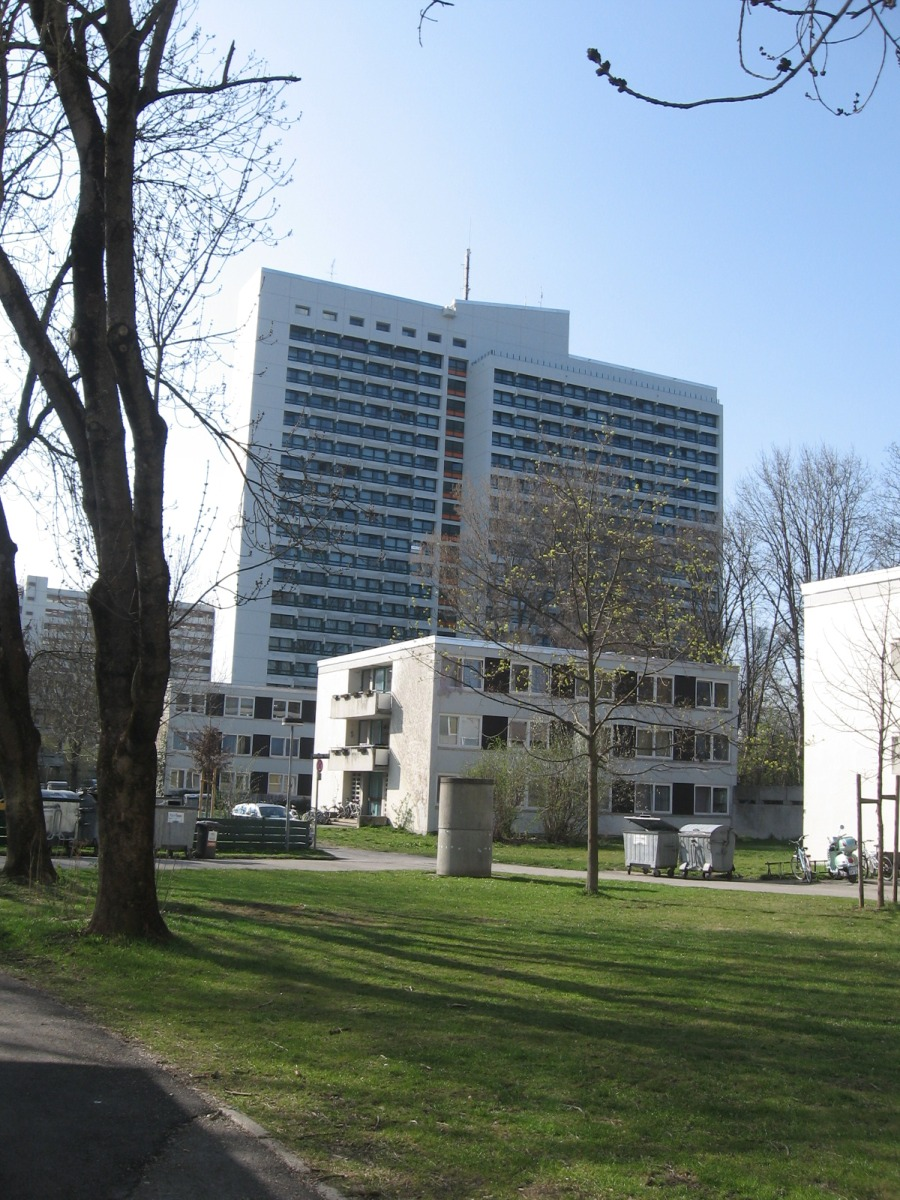
The tallest building: Hanns-Seidel-House

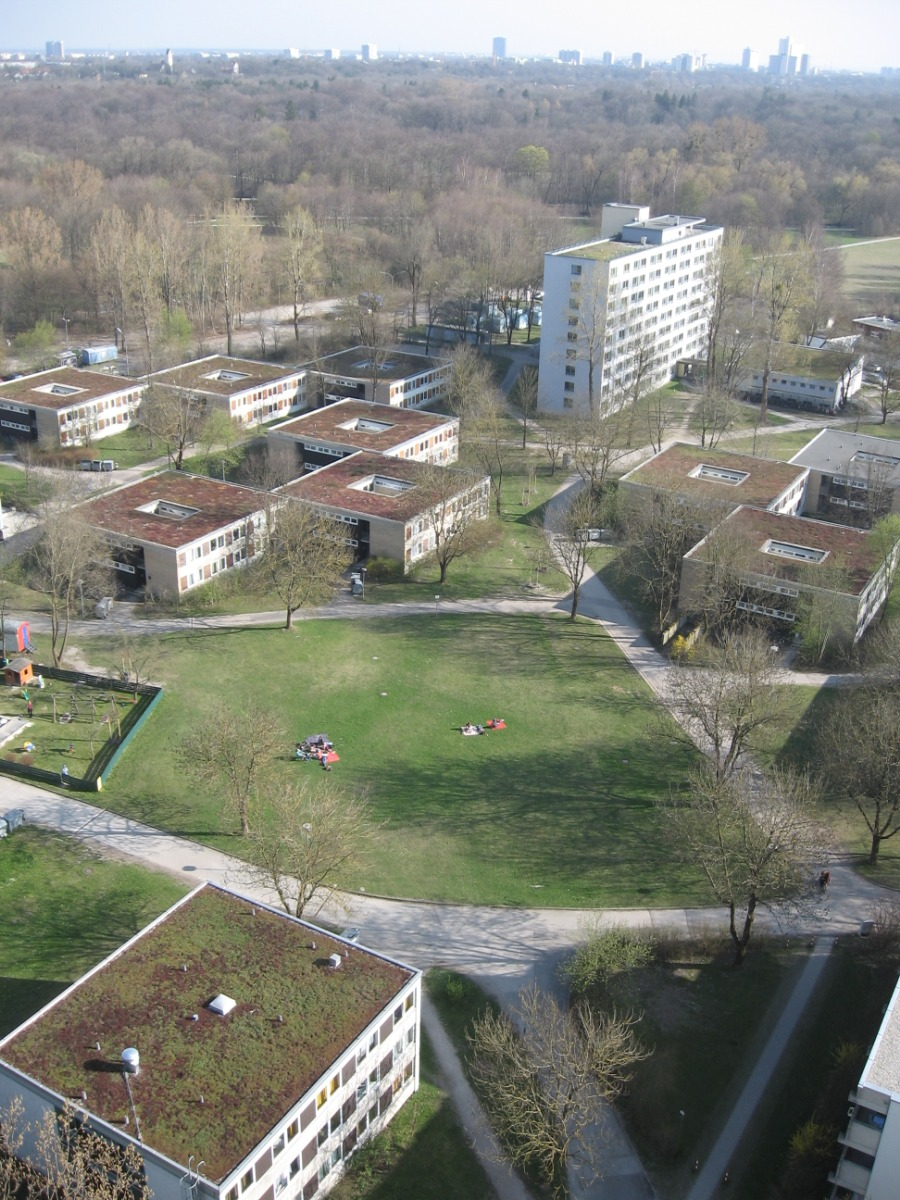
Altstadt (in the background: Max Kade House)

Studentenstadt is a student housing complex in Munich, Germany. The complex was built in two stages, from 1961 to 1968 and from 1970 to 1977, and is Germany's largest student housing complex with 2,478 residential units in 14 buildings.

Besides the Olympic Village, it is the second-largest student accommodation managed by the Studentenwerk München. In order to create affordable housing relatively quickly, several "Wohncontainer" similar to mobile homes were set up near the Studentenstadt buildings. Today, more than 2,500 people live in this complex. The streets that run through Studentenstadt are named after the World War II era resistance group, the White Rose. For example, they are named Willi-Graf-Straße, Hans-Leipelt-Straße, and Christoph-Probst-Straße.

== History ==
The concept was first developed by Egon Wiberg, the rector LMU Munich. It was founded by the Studentenwerk München. The Bavarian prime minister Hanns Seidel set aside a parcel of land of about 8 hectares on the border of the English Garden for use by the Studentenwerk München. A series of hearings and meetings took place between the state of Bavaria and Studentenwerk München. At the beginning of the project, the Max Kade Foundation donated 1,000,000 German marks. There was then an architectural competition in 1960. The resulting winner was Ernst Maria Lang, with the architectural company Lang und Pogadl. After that, about 1,500 living spaces were planned in Studentenstadt, and this count was later raised to 2,500 in 1971.

Construction began in 1961, and Studentenstadt was built in four stages. In the first stage, between 1961 and 1963, Houses 1-6 were built. In the second, between 1966 and 1968, Houses 7 and 8 were built. In the third, between 1971 and 1973, Houses 9 and 10 were built. Finally, in the final stage, the last four houses were built between 1974 and 1975. A few of these houses are named, mostly after those who supported construction. In 1975, a children's nursery was opened, and the Hans-Scholl-Halle was built between 1976 and 1977. The U-Bahn station at Studentenstadt opened on October 19, 1971, when 8 of the 14 houses had been completed.

== The Residences ==
The Studentenstadt has two primary areas: "Altstadt" (old city), consisting of several two-to-three floor buildings plus two 9-floor towers, and "Neustadt" (new city), where students live in 7-to-20 floor towers.

"Altstadt" consists of 627 single-room apartments with a size of 8–20 square meters each. Each one contains a sink. Kitchens, showers, and toilets are shared by all. There are also community lounges.

"Neustadt" consists of 1,458 single-room apartments. All apartments have a kitchenette, shower, and toilet. There are also 54 married couples apartments with 35–77 square meters of living space. They have two rooms, a kitchen, and a bathroom.

== Rugby ==
There is a rugby union club in the Studentenstadt, the StuSta München.

== Football ==
There is a football club in the Studentenstadt, that also includes a women's football team.

== The Manhattan ==
The Manhattan is a shared facility located in the tallest building in the Studentenstadt. During the summer it is located indoors on the 21st floor. When the weather permits, the Manhattan uses the west terrace on the 19th floor. It is operated by a group of students who live in the StuSta and subject to the jurisdiction of the "Heimrat" (the city council of the StuSta).

== Cultural Life ==
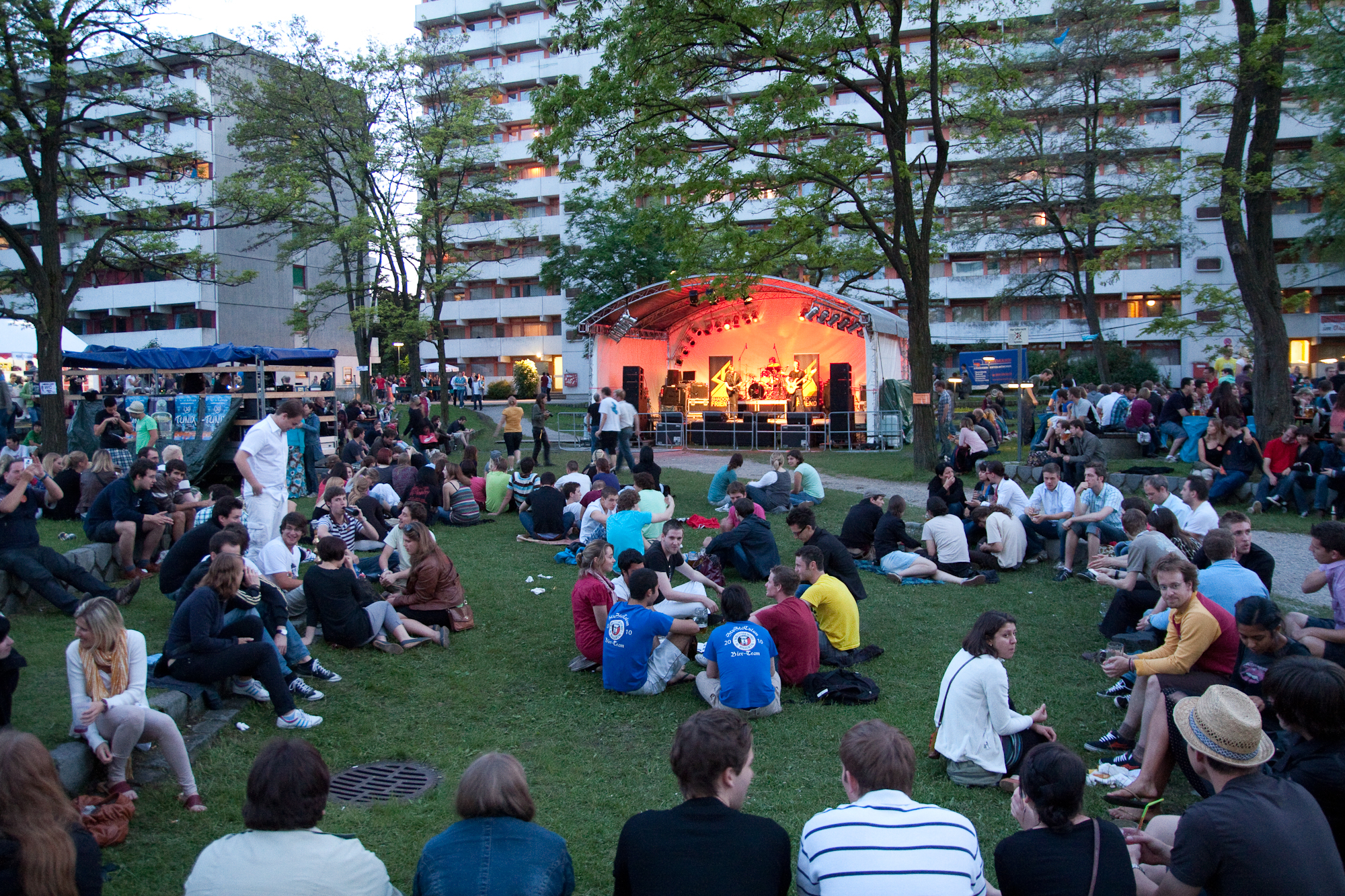
StuStaCulum 2010

The highpoint of cultural life at Studentenstadt is the Student Culture Festival, or StuStaCulum, a festival held annually since 1989 in early summer by many theatre groups, bands, and artists. It attracts about 20,000 visitors every year.

Another special was the student club 20 1/2, supervised by Robin Wachsmann between 2010-2017. It has been closed due to necessary construction works.

== Public transportation ==
Adjacent to Studentenstadt is the Studentenstadt U-Bahn station, which provides access to the U6 line and some Metro bus routes.

Studentenstadt is located in northern Munich (Freimann) between the Autobahn A9 and the northern part of the Englischer Garten in the district of Schwabing.
