= Jim Roth (businessman) =

- Born: March 1969 (age 57); United Kingdom
- Education: University of Manchester, University of Cambridge
- Occupations: Entrepreneur, businessman and author
- Known for: Co-founder of LeapFrog Investments
- Spouse: Claire Cowie

Jim Roth is a British businessman, social entrepreneur and author. He is the co-founder of LeapFrog Investments, a social finance and impact investment firm that by 2016 managed investments of more than $1 billion.

== Early years and education ==
Roth received a degree in Development Economics from the University of Manchester and a PhD from the University of Cambridge. While working towards his PhD, Roth spent time examining how individuals with a low income used financial services.

== Career ==
Prior to co-founding Leapfrog, he worked for the United Nations agency, International Labour Organization (ILO), in India. During his time at the ILO, Roth co-authored the book, Making Insurance Work for Microfinance Institutions. Roth has appeared on Bloomberg and CNBC discussing issues around the rise of the emerging consumer demographic and the role of financial services in emerging markets.
