= Jim Williamson (footballer, born 1876) =

Australian rules footballer

Personal information
- Full name: James Williamson
- Born: 5 April 1876; Ballarat, Victoria
- Died: 17 April 1956 (aged 80); Ballarat, Victoria
- Original team: Ballarat

Playing career^{1}
Years	Club	Games (Goals)
1900–02	South Melbourne	30 (0)
- ^{1} Playing statistics correct to the end of 1902.

James Williamson (5 April 1876 – 17 April 1956) was an Australian rules footballer who played with South Melbourne in the Victorian Football League (VFL).

== Family ==
The son of James Williamson, and Ann Williamson (1856–1928), née Ellims, James Williamson was born in Ballarat, Victoria on 5 April 1876.
