= James Hart Mitchell =

- Born: 8 May 1899; Hereford, Herefordshire, England
- Died: After 21 September 1921
- Military career
- Allegiance: England
- Branch: Aviation
- Rank: Captain
- Nickname: "Mitch"
- Unit: No. 28 Squadron RAF
- Awards: Military Cross; Distinguished Flying Cross; Italian Medal of Military Valor

Captain James Hart Mitchell was an English World War I flying ace credited with 11 aerial victories. He was seconded to the Royal Flying Corps during the war; he returned to his home regiment afterwards.

== World War I ==
Mitchell originally served in the Essex Regiment before his transfer to the Royal Flying Corps in 1917. After training, he was assigned to 28 Squadron, where he met budding ace Billy Barker. After his first three wins in France while flying a Sopwith Camel, the squadron transferred to the Italian Front. Mitchell scored eight more wins before being transferred out of combat duty in July 1918. When Barker was promoted to Flight Commander of C Flight despite having no experience of formation fighting, the more experienced Mitchell, already serving as a deputy Flight Commander, felt cheated. He eventually was promoted to the position, however.

During his tour of combat duty in Italy, Mitchell was awarded the Military Cross on 18 February 1918, although it would not be gazetted until 18 July 1918:

...When on patrol work, on four separate occasions, he has shot down five enemy planes, three of which were observed to burst into flames, one being a large three-seater. On two of these occasions his formation was attacked by superior formations of the enemy. His magnificent work has been marked by great dash and fearlessness.

He was also awarded a Distinguished Flying Cross, which was awarded on 2 July 1918, gazetted 21 September 1918.

The Italian government also expressed its gratitude for his service; on 2 November 1918, he was awarded Italy's Bronze Medal of Military Valor.

== Post World War I ==
On 2 February 1919, Mitchell was placed on the Royal Air Force's unemployed list. On 6 June 1919, he gave up his RAF commission to return to ground duty with the army.

On 30 September 1921, Mitchell gave up his army commission.
