= Jim Hart =

Jim Hart may refer to:

== Sports ==
- Jim Hart (American football) (born 1944), American football quarterback
- Jim Hart (manager) (1855–1919), American baseball manager
- Jim Ray Hart (1941–2016), American baseball third baseman in 1960s and '70s
- Jimmy Hart (baseball) (1875–1926), American baseball third baseman in 1901

== Others ==
- Jim Hart (artist) (born 1952), Canadian and Haida woodcarver and jeweler
- Jim Hart (musician), vibraphonist, drummer and composer
- Jim Hart (British Columbia politician) (born 1955), Canadian politician
- Jim Hart (Ontario politician), Toronto city councillor
- Jimmy Hart (born 1944), American professional wrestling manager and singer

== See also ==
- James Hart (disambiguation)
