= Jim Hogan =

Jim Hogan may refer to:

- Jim Hogan (athlete) (1933–2015), Irish distance runner
- Jim Hogan (Kilkenny hurler) (1928–2010), Irish hurler
- Jim Hogan (Limerick hurler) (1937–2016), Irish hurler
- Jim Hogan (outdoor educator)

== See also ==
- James Hogan (disambiguation)
