= James Nelson (cricketer) =

New Zealand cricketer (1873–1950)

Personal information
- Full name: James Archibald Nelson
- Born: 27 August 1873; Christchurch, New Zealand
- Died: 1 June 1950 (aged 76); Christchurch, New Zealand

Domestic team information
- Years: Team
- 1914/15: Otago
- Only FC: 17 February 1915 Otago v Southland
- Source: ESPNcricinfo, 18 May 2016

James Archibald Nelson (27 August 1873 – 1 June 1950) was a New Zealand cricketer. He played one first-class match for Otago in 1914/15.

Nelson was born in Christchurch in 1873, the son of John and Margaret Nelson. His only senior cricket match was a fixture between Otago and Southland in February 1915. (Note: Otago first played Southland in 1864 and by the time Nelson played there were two matches each season between the teams. The 1914/15 match was the first between the two representative teams to have been given first-class status―one of eight first-class matches played by Southland, six of which were against Otago between 1914/15 and 1919/20. Matches between the two teams continued to be played, with players from Southland form part of the Otago first-class team.) He scored five runs in his only innings and did not bowl during the match.

Professionally Nelson worked as a police officer. In club cricket, he played for the West Christchurch club as a bowler between 1915/16 and 1917/18, playing at a time when many younger players had joined the war effort.

Nelson died at Christchurch in 1950. He was aged 76.
