= Jim Zumbo =

American hunter

- Born: James A. Zumbo; November 9, 1940 (age 85)
- Occupations: writer, editor

James A. Zumbo (born November 9, 1940) is a firearms and hunting commentator and writer. Until February 2007, he was the hunting editor for Outdoor Life magazine and host of the television program Jim Zumbo Outdoors on The Outdoor Channel. He was removed from both positions after he criticized the use of semi-automatic rifles such as the AR-15 and AK-47 for hunting in his blog. On July 3, 2007, Zumbo's TV show went back on the air.

== Career and interests ==
Zumbo holds degrees in forestry and wildlife biology. Before becoming a writer, he worked as a forester and wildlife biologist for 15 years. He wrote his first article for Outdoor Life in 1962, and became a full-time employee of the magazine in 1978. His main focus is on big game hunting. He has written 23 books and approximately 1,500 articles for outdoor magazines. Zumbo is also a lecturer on big game hunting and firearms for organizations like the National Rifle Association and a successful wildlife photographer.

== "'Terrorist' rifles" blog entry ==
On February 16, 2007, Zumbo published an entry on his blog which read, in part:

I must be living in a vacuum. The guides on our hunt tell me that the use of AR and AK rifles have a rapidly growing following among hunters, especially prairie dog hunters. I had no clue. Only once in my life have I ever seen anyone using one of these firearms.

I call them "assault" rifles, which may upset some people. Excuse me, maybe I'm a traditionalist, but I see no place for these weapons among our hunting fraternity. I'll go so far as to call them "terrorist" rifles. They tell me that some companies are producing assault rifles that are "tackdrivers."

Sorry, folks, in my humble opinion, these things have no place in hunting. We don't need to be lumped into the group of people who terrorize the world with them, which is an obvious concern. I've always been comfortable with the statement that hunters don't use assault rifles. We've always been proud of our "sporting firearms."

This really has me concerned. As hunters, we don't need the image of walking around the woods carrying one of these weapons. To most of the public, an assault rifle is a terrifying thing. Let's divorce ourselves from them. I say game departments should ban them from the praries [sic] and woods.

Many firearms industry lobbyists were outraged that Zumbo suggested an outright ban on a type of popular rifle for reasons of "personal bias". In response to the flood of threatened boycotts, Remington Arms' CEO Tommy Millner fired Zumbo as a spokesman on February 19, The Outdoor Channel announced that Zumbo programming would be on a temporary hiatus, but did not sever their affiliations with Zumbo. His online blog was discontinued "for the time being" by Outdoor Life on February 19. Outdoor Life subsequently dropped him completely, stating on its webpage that Zumbo would no longer be contributing to the publication once the last of his columns already to press had been printed. Gerber Knives and Mossy Oak severed all of their business dealings with Zumbo as well, as did a majority of his other sponsors.

Outdoor columnist Dennis Anderson wrote in 2007 that "Zumbo's comments lent voice to what many hunters believe, namely that assault-style weapons are the black sheep of guns and do nothing to engender hunters and shooters to the general public."

== Aftermath ==
The speed with which calls for Zumbo's termination were acted on by his sponsors and employers (initial responses from sponsors occurred within a 36-hour period after he posted the first of two blog entries on the topic) were seen by many participants as evidence of the power of the Internet and of the "new media," including the "blogosphere," to influence and shape sociopolitical events. The New York Times published an editorial March 3, 2007, criticizing the destruction of Zumbo's career as overkill and avoidance of healthy debate. Two weeks after the blog appeared Mr. Zumbo was invited by NRA board member Ted Nugent to an "education" session at Nugent's Texas ranch. Jim was lectured on the sporting uses of AR type rifles by Ted and two Texas outdoor writers.

On March 20, a month after Zumbo's column was published, gun control advocate Senator Carl Levin praised Zumbo for "his forthrightness, his honesty and his courage," calling the response to his comments "swift and callous," in a speech that supported the renewal of the Federal Assault Weapons Ban. Zumbo in turn published An Open Letter to the United States Senate, saying his statements had been misrepresented, and attacking Levin's support of gun control legislation as an attack on the Second Amendment.

== Publications ==
His books include The Complete Hunter: Elk Hunting (Creative, 2000).

A biography on the life story of Jim Zumbo was written by K.J. Houtman and published by Fish On Marketing on November 11, 2016, entitled Zumbo.

== See also ==
- Cooper Firearms of Montana
