= Jim =

Jim or JIM may refer to:

== Names ==
- Jim (given name)

=== People and horses ===
- Yelkanum Seclamatan (died April 1911), Native American chief, nicknamed "Jim"
- Juan Ignacio Martínez (born 1964), Spanish footballer, commonly known as JIM
- Jim (horse), milk wagon horse used to produce serum containing diphtheria antitoxin
- Jim (Medal of Honor recipient)

== Media and publications ==
- Jim (book), about Jim Brown written by James Toback
- Jim (comics), a series by Jim Woodring
- Jim!, an album by rock and roll singer Jim Dale
- Jim (album), by soul artist Jamie Lidell
- Jim (Huckleberry Finn), a character in Mark Twain's novel
- Jim (TV channel), in Finland
- Jim (YRF Spy Universe), a fictional film character in the Indian YRF Spy Universe, portrayed by John Abraham
- JIM (Flemish TV channel), a Flemish television channel
- "Jim" (song), 1941
- Journal of Internal Medicine, a medical journal
- "Jim", a song by Swans from My Father Will Guide Me up a Rope to the Sky

== Other uses ==
- OPCW-UN Joint Investigative Mechanism
- JIM suit, for atmospheric diving
- Jim River, in North and South Dakota, US
- JIM, Jiangxi Isuzu Motors, a joint venture between Isuzu and Jiangling Motors Corporation Group (JMCG)

== See also ==
- Gym
- Jjim
- Ǧīm
- James (disambiguation)
- Jimbo (disambiguation)
- Jimmy (disambiguation)
- JYM (disambiguation)
