= Climate finance in New Zealand =

Climate finance in New Zealand includes a mixture of domestic and internationally sourced funding for climate change adaptation, mitigation and resilience.

== Nationally determined contributions ==
New Zealand is a party to the United Nations Framework Convention on Climate Change (UNFCCC) and has signed and ratified the Paris Agreement. New Zealand's government's National Determined Contribution also known as Tuia te Waka a Kiwa is to reduce greenhouse gas emissions to as low as 50% by 2030.

New Zealand's Minister of Climate Change, James Shaw revealed in 2021 that the government was investing half of New Zealand's 1.3 billion dollars in climate finance funds to support climate-affected neighbours. This was part of the Climate Emergency Declarations in New Zealand to tackle climate issues.

== Major financial support ==
The major financial support for Climate financing in New Zealand is from Aotearoa New Zealand under the Ministry of Environment. The Aotearoa Climate Change Engagement Plan New Zealand has pledged $1.3 billion for climate financing between 2022 and 2025. The government announced the creation of the Climate Emergency Response Fund with a $4.5 billion start-up amount to tackle climate issues including climate finance in the Country.

Also, the government of New Zealand has committed $200 million to climate financing for 2015 to 2019.
