= Climate emergency =

Climate emergency may refer to:

- Human-caused climate change
- Climate crisis, a characterization of climate change
- Climate emergency declaration, a public declaration of a state of climate emergency
