= Climate emergency declarations in Australia =

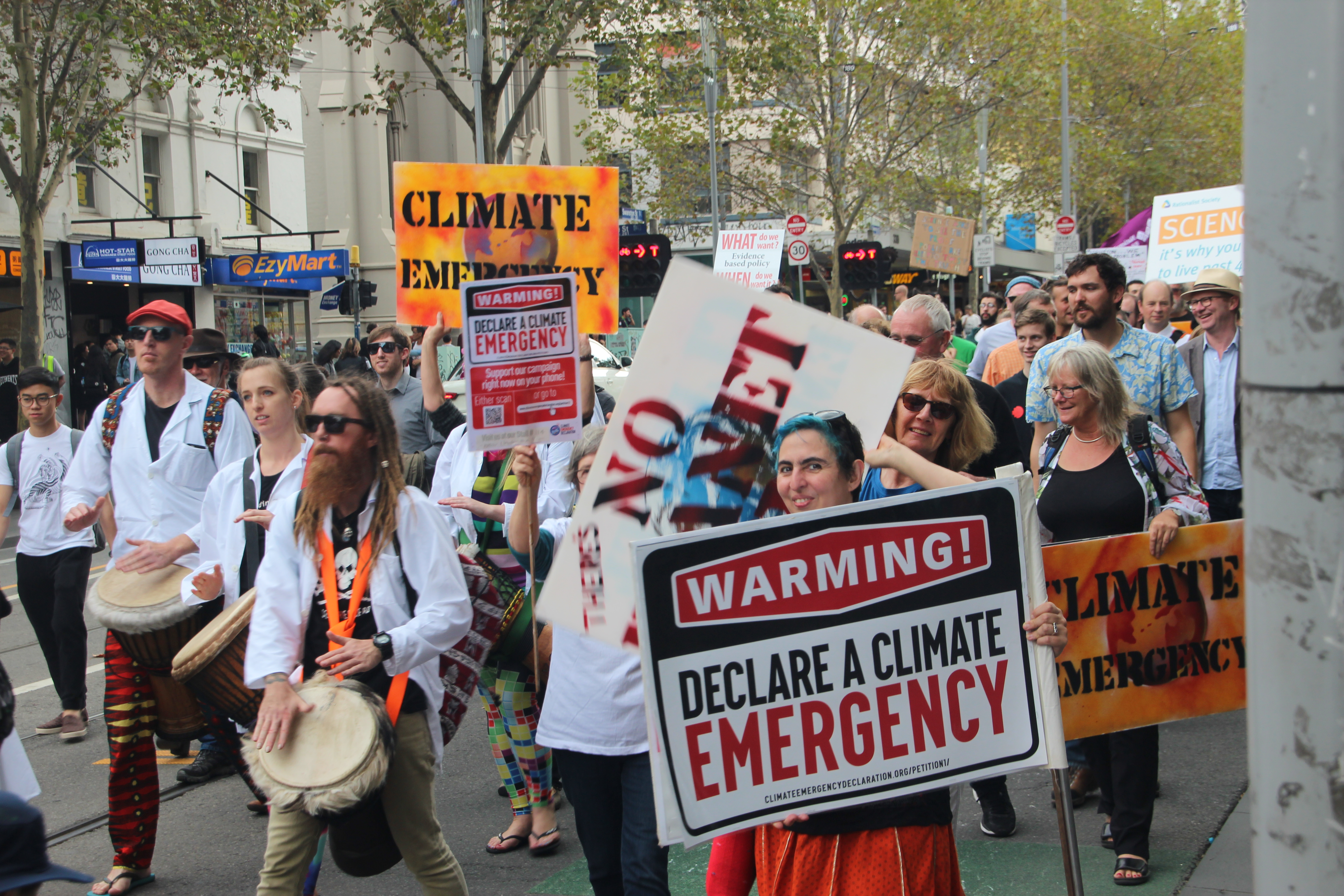
Thousands of Melburnians turned up and marched for action on climate on 22 April, Earth Day 2017.

Climate Emergency is being declared in Australia similarly to many other jurisdictions across the world (actions known as Climate emergency declaration). One such jurisdiction in Australia, Darebin City Council, was the first one in the world to declare a climate emergency in 2016. This page lists all known climate emergency declarations within Australian jurisdictions across all three levels of government in Australia (Local, State, and Federal).

== Federal ==
There is currently no declaration of a climate emergency at the Federal level in Australia, although there have been multiple motions moved to declare one.

In October 2019, the Australian Labor Party supported the Australian Greens Party's motion to declare a climate emergency. The motion was additionally supported by crossbenchers Zali Steggall, Helen Haines, and Andrew Wilkie, as well as Centre Alliance. However, the proposition failed with members of the Morrison Government and some crossbenchers voting against it.

== State/Territory ==
Climate Emergencies Declared by State/Territory

The Australian Capital Territory is the first and only territory to have declared a climate emergency. The South Australian Parliament voted for a climate emergency in the upper house and lower house in South Australia.

States/Territories That Have Declared a Climate Emergency
| State/Territory | Declared a Climate Emergency | Date |
|---|---|---|
| Australian Capital Territory | Yes | Labor/Green Coalition Government voted for a climate emergency on 16 May 2019 |
| New South Wales | No | N/A |
| Northern Territory | No | N/A |
| Queensland | No | N/A |
| South Australia | Yes | Upper House of SA Parliament voted for a climate emergency in 2019. The climate emergency motion passed the lower house in 2022 |
| Tasmania | No | N/A |
| Victoria | No | N/A |
| Western Australia | No | N/A |

== Local Government ==
In June 2019, Councillor Trent McCarthy of the City of Darebin brought together councillors and parliamentarians in Australia and around the world in online link-ups to facilitate collaboration between councils and governments which have declared a climate emergency. Following these link-ups and a successful motion at the National General Assembly of Local Government, McCarthy announced the formation of Climate Emergency Australia, a new network of Australian governments and councils advocating for an emergency response to climate change.

Local government has been the most active level of government in declaring a climate emergency in Australia. Currently, every state in Australia has at least one local government jurisdiction that has declared a climate emergency. Only two capital city local governments have not declared a climate emergency: the City of Perth, which has not yet voted on a climate emergency declaration, and the City of Brisbane, which has voted against a motion to declare a climate emergency. Below is a list of local governments, showing which have declared a climate emergency, which have voted against a climate emergency, and which have not voted on a climate emergency.

=== New South Wales ===
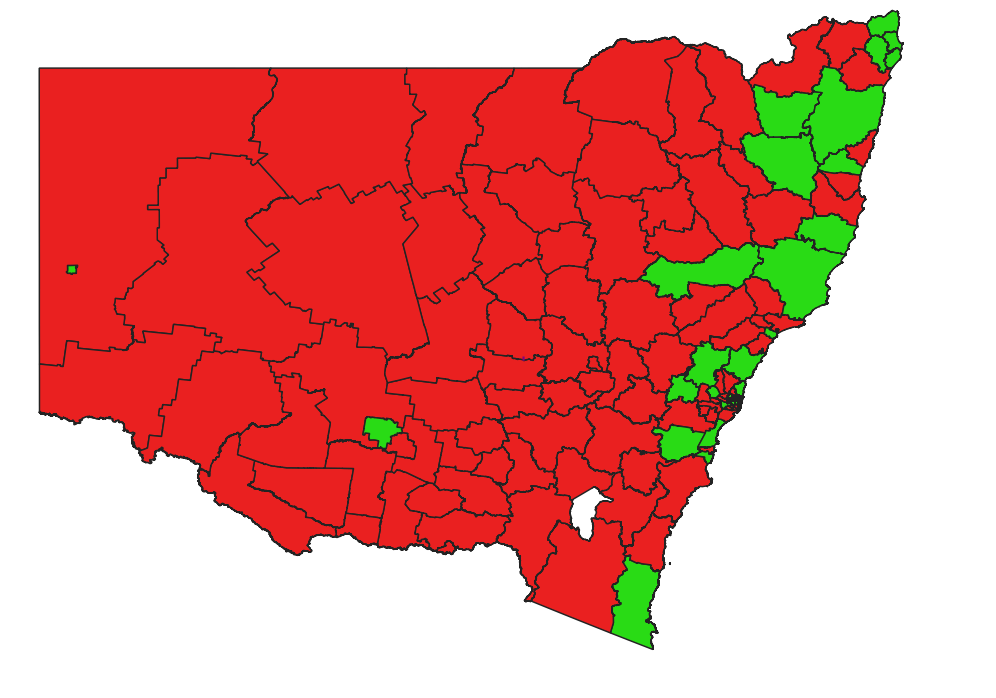
Climate Emergencies Declared by Local Government Areas in NSW

36 of 128 local government jurisdictions in NSW have declared a climate emergency, the highest number of any state, although Victoria has the highest percentage of councils that have declared a climate emergency.

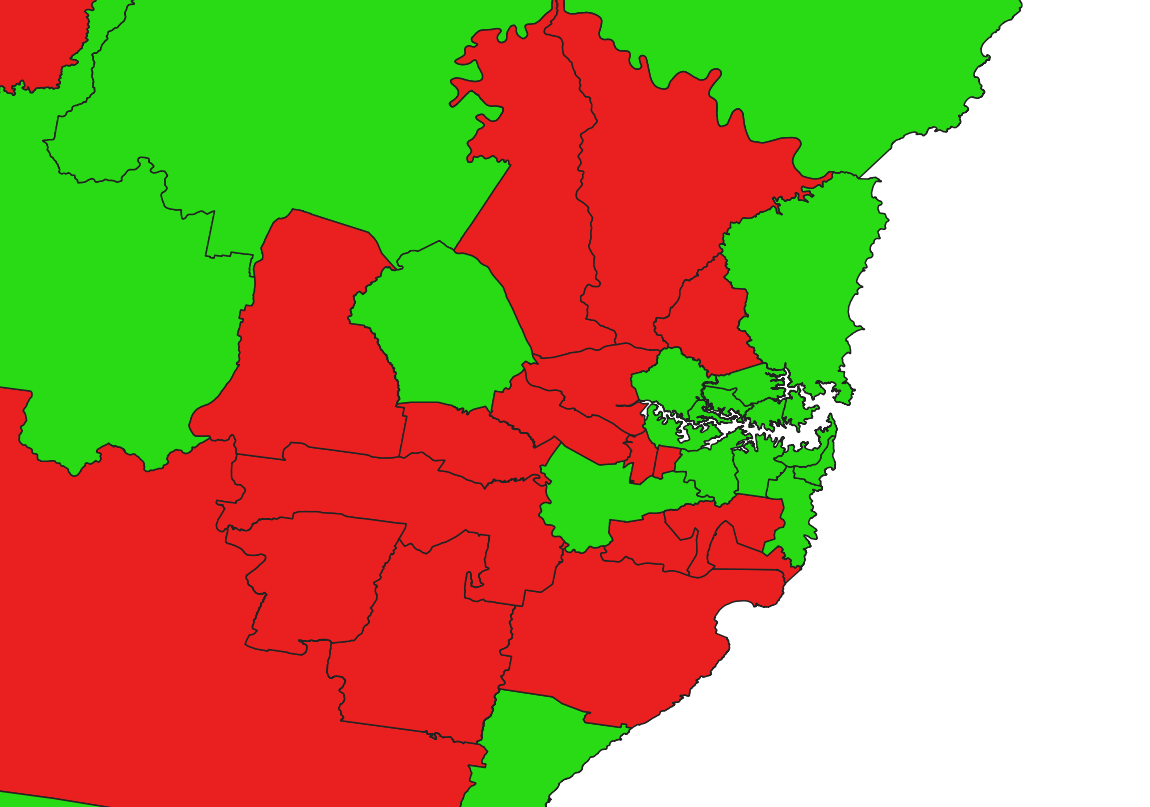
Climate Emergencies Declared by Metropolitan Local Government Areas

| Council | Climate Emergency Declared | Date |
|---|---|---|
| Albury City Council | Yes | March 2022 |
| Armidale Regional Council | Yes | 23 October 2019 |
| Ballina Shire Council | Yes | 29 November 2019 Ballina Shire was the 72nd Council in Australia to declare a climate emergency |
| Balranald Shire Council | No | N/A |
| Bathurst Regional Council | No | N/A |
| Bayside Council | No | N/A |
| Bega Valley Shire Council | Yes | 28 August 2019 |
| Bellingen Shire Council | Yes | 27 March 2019 |
| Berrigan Shire Council | No | N/A |
| Blacktown City Council | Yes | 26 February 2020 |
| Bland Shire Council | No | N/A |
| Blayney Shire | No | N/A |
| Blue Mountains City Council | Yes | 26 February 2020 |
| Bogan Shire Council | No | N/A |
| Bourke Shire Council | No | N/A |
| Brewarrina Shire Council | No | N/A |
| Broken Hill City Council | Yes | 25 September 2019 |
| Burwood Council | No | N/A |
| Byron Shire Council | Yes | 18 October 2018 |
| Cabonne Council | No | N/A |
| Camden Council | No | N/A |
| Campbelltown, City of | No | N/A |
| Canada Bay, City of | Yes | 17 September 2019 |
| Sydney, City of | Yes | 24 June 2019 |
| Canterbury-Bankstown, City of | Yes | 27 August 2019 |
| Carrathool Shire Council | No | N/A |
| Central Coast Council | Yes | 26 August 2019 |
| Central Darling Shire Council | No | N/A |
| Cessnock City Council | No | N/A |
| Clarence Valley Council | Yes | 23 April 2019 |
| Cobar Shire Council | No | N/A |
| Coffs Harbour, City of | No | On the 10 October 2019, Coffs Harbour City Council voted against declaring a climate emergency. |
| Coolamon Shire Council | No | N/A |
| Coonamble Shire Council | No | N/A |
| Cowra Shire Council | No | N/A |
| Cumberland County | No | N/A |
| Dubbo Regional Council | No | N/A |
| Dungog Shire Council | No | N/A |
| Edward River Council | No | N/A |
| Eurobodalla Shire Council | No | N/A |
| Fairfield City Council | No | N/A |
| Federation Council | No | N/A |
| Forbes Shire Council | No | N/A |
| Georges River Council | No | N/A |
| Gilgandra Shire Council | No | N/A |
| Glen Innes Severn Council | Yes | 26 September 2019 |
| Goulburn Mulwaree Council | No | N/A |
| Greater Hume Shire Council | No | N/A |
| Griffith, City of | Yes | N/A |
| Cootamundra-Gundagai Regional Council | No | N/A |
| Gunnedah Shire Council | No | N/A |
| Gwydir Shire Council | No | N/A |
| Port Macquarie-Hastings Council | Yes | 17 March 2021 |
| Hawkesbury City Council | Yes | 12 March 2019 |
| Hay Shire Council | No | N/A |
| Hilltops Council | No | N/A |
| Hornsby Shire | No | N/A |
| Hunter's Hill, Municipality of | Yes | 24 February 2020 |
| Inner West Council | Yes | 14 May 2019 |
| Inverell Shire Council | No | N/A |
| Junee Shire Council | No | N/A |
| Kempsey Shire Council | No | N/A |
| Kiama, Municipality of | Yes | 17 December 2019 |
| Ku-ring-gai Council | No | N/A |
| Kyogle Council | No | N/A |
| Lachlan Shire Council | No | N/A |
| Lake Macquarie City Council | No | N/A |
| Lane Cove Council | Yes | 16 September 2019 |
| Leeton Shire Council | No | N/A |
| Lismore, City of | Yes | 13 August 2019 |
| Lithgow, City of | No | N/A |
| Liverpool City Council | No | N/A |
| Liverpool Plains Shire Council | No | N/A |
| Lockhart Shire Council | No | N/A |
| Maitland City Council | No | N/A |
| Mid-Coast Council | Yes | 23 October 2019 |
| Mid-Western Regional Council | No | N/A |
| Moree Plains Shire Council | No | N/A |
| Mosman Municipal Council | Yes | 12 November 2019 |
| Murray River Council | No | N/A |
| Murrumbidgee Council | No | N/A |
| Muswellbrook Shire Council | No | N/A |
| Nambucca Valley Council | No | N/A |
| Narrabri Shire Council | No | N/A |
| Narrandera Shire Council | No | N/A |
| Narromine Shire Council | No | N/A |
| City of Newcastle | Yes | 28 May 2019 |
| North Sydney Council | Yes | 22 July 2019 |
| Northern Beaches Council | Yes | 27 August 2019 |
| Oberon Council | No | N/A |
| Orange, City of | No | N/A |
| Parkes Shire Council | No | N/A |
| Parramatta, City of | No | N/A |
| Penrith City Council | No | N/A |
| Port Macquarie-Hastings Council | No | On 15 February 2022, the previous declaration of 18 March 2021 was rescinded. |
| Port Stephens Council | No | N/A |
| Queanbeyan-Palerang Regional Council | No | N/A |
| Randwick, City of | Yes | 30 April 2019 |
| Richmond Valley Council | No | N/A |
| Ryde, City of | Yes | 28 May 2019 |
| Shellharbour City Council | No | N/A |
| Shoalhaven City Council | No | N/A |
| Singleton Council | No | N/A |
| Snowy Monaro Regional Council | No | N/A |
| Snowy Valleys Council | No | N/A |
| Strathfield Municipal Council | No | N/A |
| Sutherland Shire Council | No | N/A |
| Tamworth Regional Council | No | N/A |
| Temora Shire Council | No | N/A |
| Tenterfield Shire Council | No | N/A |
| The Hills Shire Council | No | N/A |
| Tweed Shire Council | Yes | 19 September 2019 |
| Upper Hunter Shire Council | Yes | 25 February 2019 |
| Upper Lachlan Shire Council | No | N/A |
| Uralla Shire Council | No | N/A |
| Wagga Wagga City Council | No | N/A |
| Walcha Council | No | N/A |
| Walgett Shire Council | No | N/A |
| Warren Shire Council | No | N/A |
| Warrumbungle Shire Council | No | N/A |
| Waverley Council | Yes | 10 December 2019 |
| Weddin Shire Council | No | N/A |
| Wentworth Shire Council | No | N/A |
| Willoughby, City of | Yes | 17 October 2019 |
| Wingecarribee Shire Council | Yes | 12 February 2020 |
| Wollondilly Shire Council | No | N/A |
| Wollongong City Council | Yes | 12 August 2019 |
| Woollahra, Municipality of | Yes | 9 September 2019 |
| Yass Valley Council | No | N/A |

=== Northern Territory ===
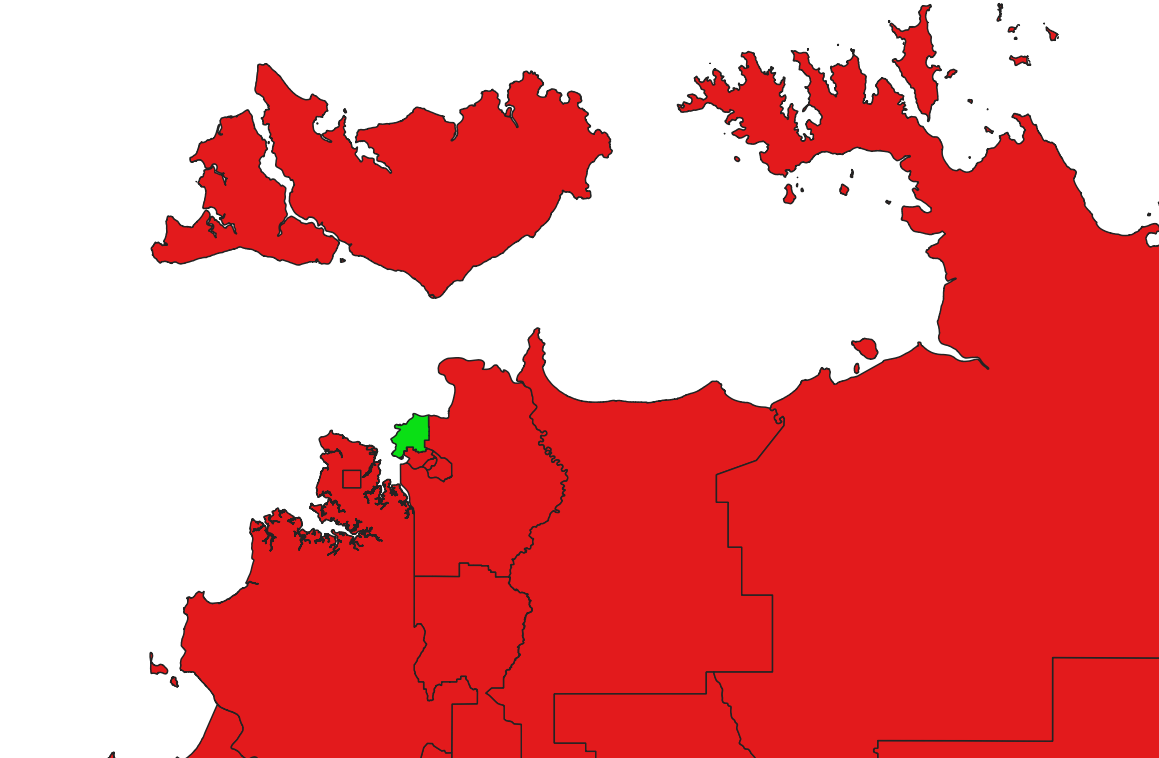
Climate Emergency Declared by Darwin City Council

Only one local government jurisdiction in the Northern Territory has declared a climate emergency, and that is the City of Darwin.

| Council | Climate Emergency Declared | Date |
|---|---|---|
| Alice Springs, Town of | No | N/A |
| Alyangula | No | N/A |
| Barkly Regional Council | No | N/A |
| Belyuen Shire Community Government Council | No | N/A |
| Central Desert Regional Council | No | N/A |
| Coomalie Shire Community Government Council | No | N/A |
| Darwin, City of | Yes | Darwin was the first local government jurisdiction in the Northern Territory to declare a climate emergency, on 30 July 2019. |
| Northern Territory Rates Act Area (East Arm) | No | N/A |
| East Arnhem Regional Council | No | N/A |
| Katherine, Town of | No | N/A |
| Litchfield Municipality | No | N/A |
| MacDonnell Regional Council | No | N/A |
| Nhulunbuy Corporation | No | N/A |
| Palmerston, City of | No | N/A |
| Roper Gulf Regional Council | No | N/A |
| Tiwi Islands Regional Council | No | N/A |
| Unincorporated Top End Region (Finnis-Mary) | No | N/A |
| Victoria Daly Regional Council | No | N/A |
| Wagait Shire Council | No | N/A |
| West Arnhem Regional Council | No | N/A |
| West Daly Regional Council | No | N/A |
| Yulara | No | N/A |

=== Queensland ===
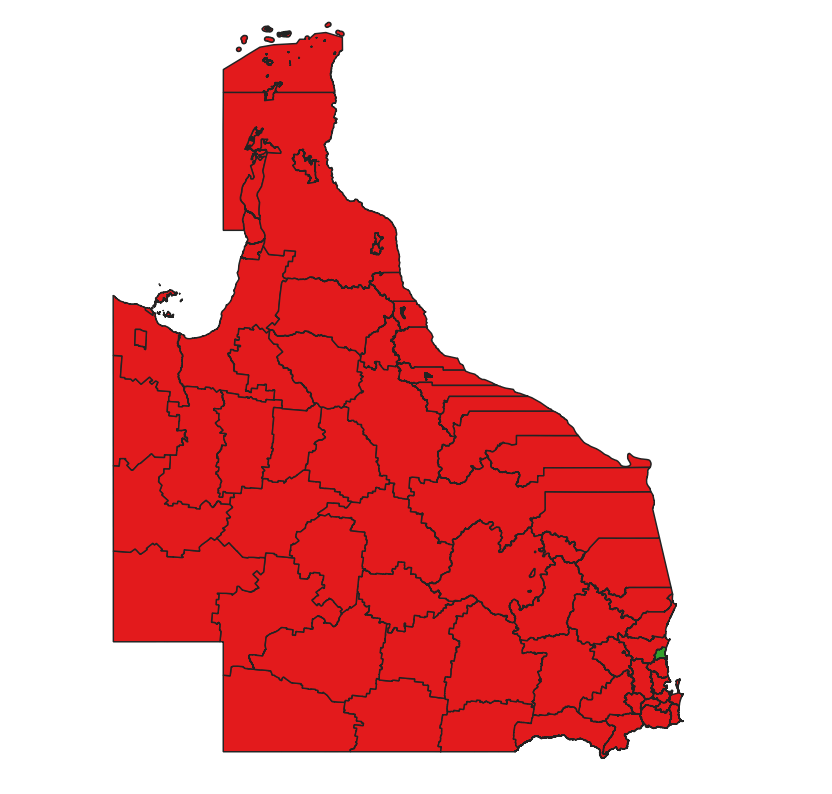
Climate Emergency Declared by Noosa City Council

Two councils have declared a climate emergency in Queensland: Noosa Council and Sunshine Coast Council. Brisbane City Council voted against a climate emergency, one of only two capital city zones in Australia that have not declared a climate emergency.

| Council | Climate Emergency Declared | Date |
|---|---|---|
| Aurukun Shire Council | No | N/A |
| Balonne Shire Council | No | N/A |
| Banana Shire Council | No | N/A |
| Barcaldine Regional Council | No | N/A |
| Barcoo Shire Council | No | N/A |
| Blackall-Tambo Regional Council | No | N/A |
| Boulia Shire Council | No | N/A |
| Brisbane City Council | No | Voted against climate emergency on 31 July 2019 |
| Bulloo Shire Council | No | N/A |
| Bundaberg Regional Council | No | N/A |
| Burdekin Shire Council | No | N/A |
| Burke Shire Council | No | N/A |
| Cairns Regional Council | No | N/A |
| Carpentaria Shire Council | No | N/A |
| Cassowary Coast Regional Council | No | N/A |
| Central Highlands Regional Council | No | N/A |
| Charters Towers Regional Council | No | N/A |
| Cherbourg Aboriginal Shire Council | No | N/A |
| Cloncurry Shire Council | No | N/A |
| Cook Shire Council | No | N/A |
| Croydon Shire Council | No | N/A |
| Diamantina Shire Council | No | N/A |
| Doomadgee Aboriginal Shire Council | No | N/A |
| Douglas, Shire of | No | N/A |
| Etheridge Shire Council | No | N/A |
| Flinders Shire Council | No | N/A |
| Fraser Coast Regional Council | No | N/A |
| Gladstone Regional Council | No | N/A |
| Gold Coast City Council | No | N/A |
| Goondiwindi Regional Council | No | N/A |
| Gympie Regional Council | No | N/A |
| Hinchinbrook Shire Council | No | N/A |
| Hope Vale, Aboriginal Shire of | No | N/A |
| Ipswich City Council | No | N/A |
| Isaac Regional Council | No | N/A |
| Kowanyama Aboriginal Shire Council | No | N/A |
| Livingstone, Shire of | No | N/A |
| Lockhart River, Aboriginal Shire of | No | N/A |
| Lockyer Valley Regional Council | No | N/A |
| Logan City Council | No | N/A |
| Longreach Regional Council | No | N/A |
| Mackay Regional Council | No | N/A |
| Mapoon, Aboriginal Shire of | No | N/A |
| Maranoa Regional Council | No | N/A |
| Mareeba, Shire of | No | N/A |
| McKinlay Shire Council | No | N/A |
| Moreton Bay Regional Council | No | N/A |
| Mornington Shire Council | No | N/A |
| Mount Isa City Council | No | N/A |
| Murweh Shire Council | No | N/A |
| Napranum Aboriginal Shire Council | No | N/A |
| Noosa Shire Council | Yes | 18 July 2019 |
| North Burnett Regional Council | No | N/A |
| Northern Peninsula Area Regional Council | No | N/A |
| Palm Island Aboriginal Shire Council | No | N/A |
| Paroo Shire Council | No | N/A |
| Pormpuraaw Aboriginal Shire Council | No | N/A |
| Quilpie Shire Council | No | N/A |
| Redland City Council | No | N/A |
| Richmond Shire Council | No | N/A |
| Rockhampton Regional Council | No | N/A |
| Scenic Rim Regional Council | No | N/A |
| Somerset Regional Council | No | N/A |
| South Burnett Regional Council | No | N/A |
| Southern Downs Regional Council | No | N/A |
| Sunshine Coast Council | Yes | November 2021 |
| Tablelands Regional Council | No | N/A |
| Toowoomba Regional Council | No | N/A |
| Torres Shire Council | No | N/A |
| Torres Strait Island Regional Council | No | N/A |
| Townsville City Council | No | N/A |
| Western Downs Regional Council | No | N/A |
| Whitsunday Regional Council | No | N/A |
| Winton Shire Council | No | N/A |
| Woorabinda Aboriginal Shire Council | No | N/A |
| Wujal Wujal Aboriginal Shire Council | No | N/A |
| Yarrabah, Aboriginal Shire of | No | N/A |

=== South Australia ===
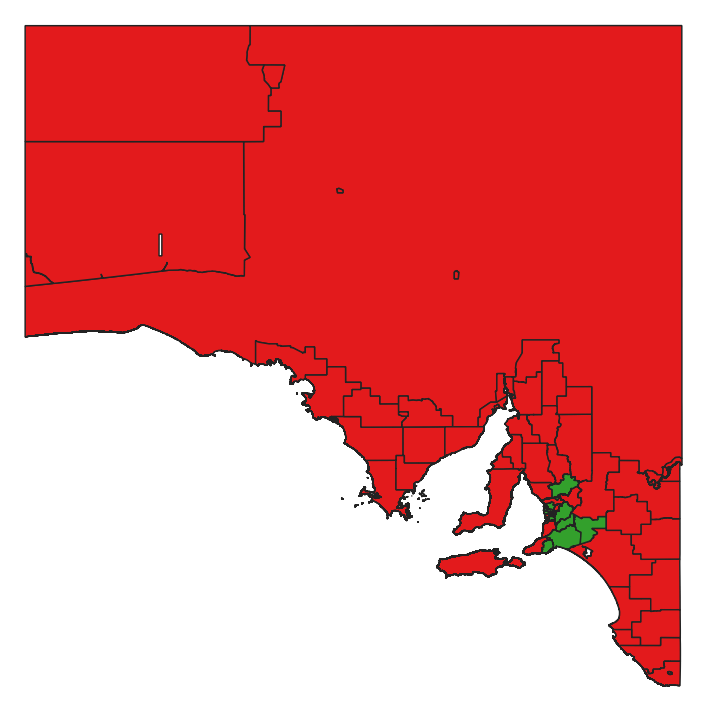
Climate Emergencies Declared by South Australian Local Government Areas

16 of the 67 local government jurisdictions in South Australia have declared a climate emergency, the Town of Gawler being the first.

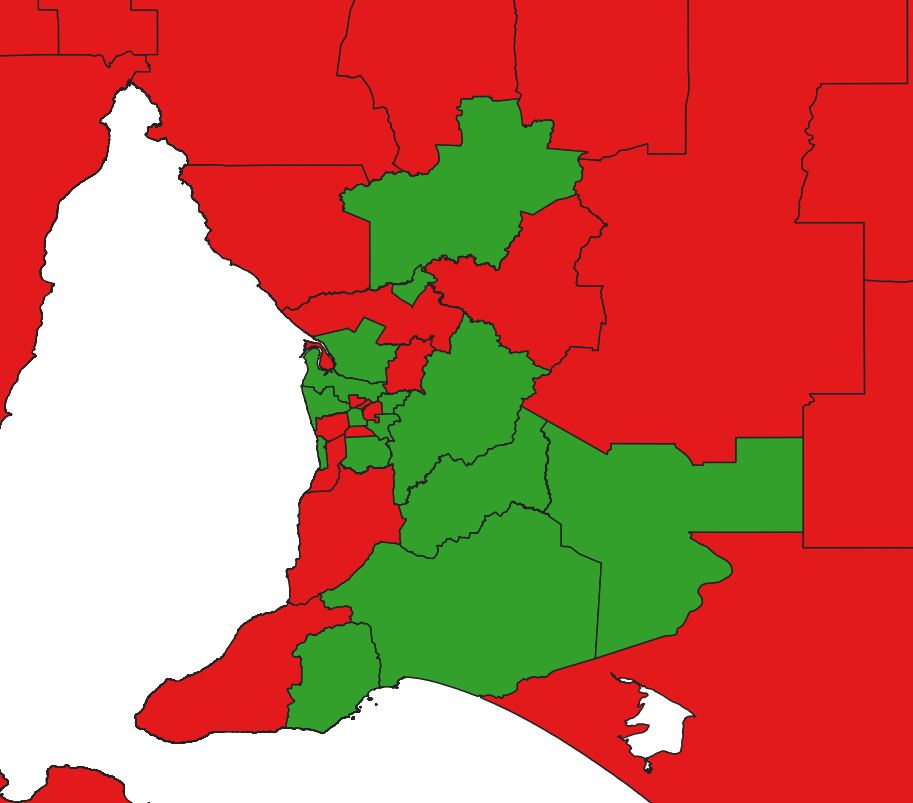
Climate Emergencies Declared by South Australian Metropolitan Local Government Areas

| Council | Climate Emergency Declared | Date |
|---|---|---|
| Adelaide Hills Council | Yes | Adelaide Hills Council was the second council in South Australia and the 13th council in Australia to declare a climate emergency, on 26 March 2019. |
| Adelaide Plains Council | No | N/A |
| Alexandrina Council | Yes | 16 December 2019 |
| Anangu Pitjantjatjara Yankunytjatjara | No | N/A |
| Barossa Council | No | N/A |
| Berri Barmera Council | No | N/A |
| Adelaide, City of | Yes | The City of Adelaide was the fourth capital city council and the fourth South Australian council to declare a climate emergency, on 27 August 2019 |
| Burnside, City of | Yes | 24 September 2019 |
| Campbelltown, City of | Yes | 5 November 2019 |
| Ceduna, District Council of | No | N/A |
| Charles Sturt, City of | Yes | 9 December 2019 |
| Clare & Gilbert Valleys Council | No | N/A |
| Cleve, District Council of | No | N/A |
| Coober Pedy, District Council of | No | N/A |
| Coorong District Council | No | N/A |
| Copper Coast Council | No | N/A |
| Elliston, District Council of | No | N/A |
| Flinders Ranges Council | No | N/A |
| Franklin Harbour, District Council of | No | N/A |
| Gawler, Town of | Yes | The Town of Gawler was the first South Australian Council to declare a climate emergency, on 22 January 2019. |
| Goyder, Regional Council of | No | N/A |
| Grant, District Council of | No | N/A |
| Holdfast Bay, City of | Yes | 8 October 2019 |
| Kangaroo Island Council | No | N/A |
| Karoonda East Murray, District Council of | No | N/A |
| Kimba, District Council of | No | N/A |
| Kingston District Council | No | N/A |
| Light Regional Council | Yes | 26 March 2019 |
| Lower Eyre Peninsula, District Council of | No | N/A |
| Loxton Waikerie, District Council of | No | N/A |
| Marion, City of | No | Voted against a climate emergency on 26 March 2019 |
| Mid Murray Council | No | N/A |
| Mitcham, City of | Yes | 22 October 2019 |
| Mount Barker District Council | Yes | 4 November 2019 |
| Mount Gambier, City of | No | N/A |
| Mount Remarkable, District Council of | No | N/A |
| Murray Bridge, Rural City of | Yes | 14 October 2019 |
| Naracoorte Lucindale Council | No | N/A |
| Northern Areas Council | No | N/A |
| Norwood Payneham & St Peters, City of | No | N/A |
| Onkaparinga, City of | No | N/A |
| Orroroo Carrieton, District Council of | No | N/A |
| Peterborough, District Council of | No | N/A |
| Playford, City of | No | N/A |
| Port Adelaide Enfield, City of | Yes | 8 October 2019 |
| Port Augusta City Council | No | N/A |
| Port Lincoln, City of | Yes | 19 August 2019 |
| Port Pirie Regional Council | No | N/A |
| Prospect, City of | No | N/A |
| Renmark Paringa Council | No | N/A |
| Robe, District Council of | No | N/A |
| Roxby Downs, Municipal Council of | No | N/A |
| Salisbury, City of | Yes | 28 October 2019 |
| Southern Mallee District Council | No | N/A |
| Streaky Bay, District Council of | No | N/A |
| Tatiara District Council | No | N/A |
| Tea Tree Gully, City of | No | N/A |
| Tumby Bay, District Council of | No | N/A |
| Unley, City of | No | N/A |
| Victor Harbour, City of | Yes | 16 December 2019 |
| Wakefield Regional Council | No | N/A |
| Walkerville, Corporation of the Town of | No | N/A |
| Wattle Range Council | No | N/A |
| West Torrens, City of | No | N/A |
| Whyalla, City of | No | N/A |
| Wudinna District Council | No | N/A |
| Yankalilla, District Council of | No | N/A |

=== Tasmania ===
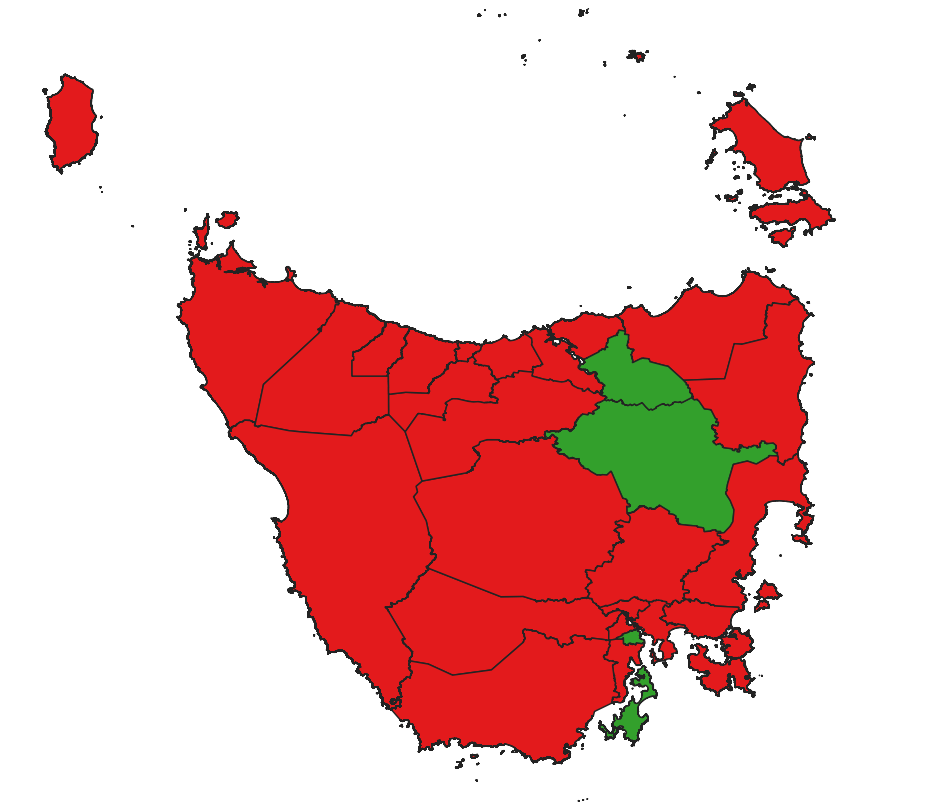
Climate Emergencies declared by Tasmanian Local Government Areas

Five councils in Tasmania have declared a climate emergency. Three councils have rejected or voted against a declaration.

| Council | Climate Emergency Declared | Date |
|---|---|---|
| Break O' Day Council | No | Voted against climate emergency motion June 2019 |
| Brighton Council | No | N/A |
| Burnie Council | No | N/A |
| Central Coast Council | No | N/A |
| Central Highlands Council | No | N/A |
| Circular Head Council | No | N/A |
| Clarence City Council | No | N/A |
| Derwent Valley Council | No | N/A |
| Devonport City Council | No | N/A |
| Dorset Council | No | N/A |
| Flinders Council | No | N/A |
| George Town Council | No | N/A |
| Glamorgan Spring Bay Council | No | N/A |
| Glenorchy City Council | No | Voted against climate emergency motion, October 2019. |
| Hobart City Council | Yes | June 2019 |
| Huon Valley Council | Yes | January 2023 |
| Kentish Council | No | N/A |
| Kingborough Council | Yes | July 2019 |
| King Island Council | No | N/A |
| Latrobe Council | No | N/A |
| Launceston City Council | Yes | August 2019 |
| Meander Valley Council | No | Voted against climate emergency motion, December 2019. |
| Northern Midlands Council | Yes | 29 October 2020 |
| Sorell Council | No | N/A |
| Southern Midlands Council | No | N/A |
| Tasman Council | No | N/A |
| Waratah Wynyard Council | No | N/A |
| West Coast Council | No | N/A |
| West Tamar Council | No | N/A |

=== Victoria ===
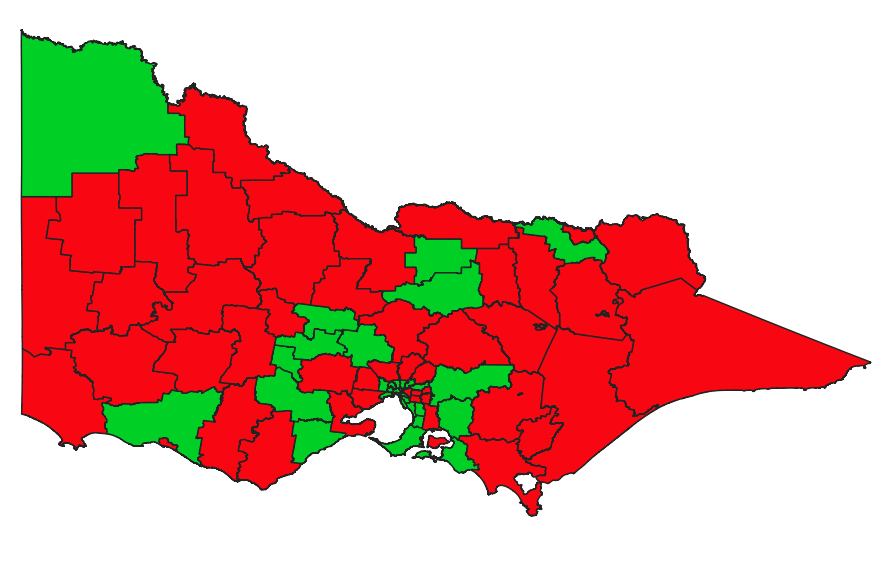
Climate Emergencies Declared by Local Government Areas

With 35 of 79 Local Government jurisdictions in Victoria having declared a climate emergency, this is the highest percentage of climate emergencies declared for any state. Darebin City Council in Victoria was the first jurisdiction in the world to declare a climate emergency in 2016.

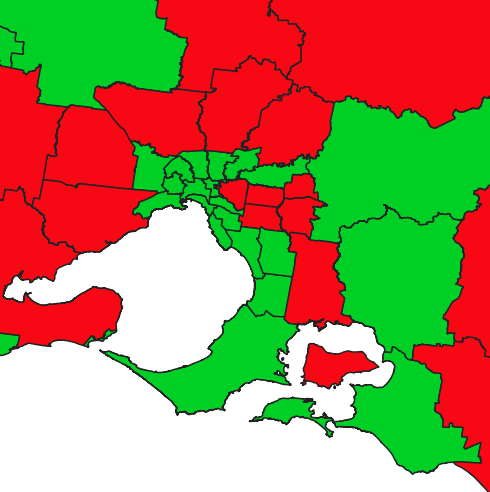
Climate Emergency Declarations by Metropolitan Local Government Areas

| Council | Climate Emergency Declared | Date | Climate Targets |
|---|---|---|---|
| Alpine Shire | Yes | 5 November 2021 | Has a target of net zero emissions for council operations by 2023 |
| Ararat, Rural City of | No | N/A | No Target |
| Ballarat, City of | Yes | 21 November 2018 | |
| Banyule City Council | Yes | 7 October 2019 | Banyule City Council has a target to be carbon neutral by 2040 |
| Bass Coast Shire | Yes | 21 August 2019 | |
| Baw Baw, Shire of | No | N/A | |
| Bayside City Council | Yes | 17 December 2019 | Bayside Council was certified carbon neutral in December 2020 |
| Benalla, Rural City of | No | N/A | |
| Boroondara City Council | No | N/A | |
| Brimbank, City of | Yes | 25 June 2019 | |
| Buloke, Shire of | No | N/A | |
| Campaspe, Shire of | No | N/A | |
| Cardinia, Shire of | Yes | 19 September 2019 | |
| Casey, City of | No | N/A | |
| Central Goldfields Shire Council | No | N/A | |
| Colac Otway, Shire of | No | N/A | |
| Corangamite, Shire of | No | N/A | |
| Darebin, City of | Yes | 5 December 2016 | |
| East Gippsland Shire Council | No | N/A | |
| East Frankston, City of | Yes | 20 November 2019 | |
| Gannawarra, Shire of | No | N/A | |
| Glen Eira City Council | Yes | 5 May 2020 | |
| Glenelg Shire Council | No | N/A | |
| Golden Plains Shire | Yes | 27 July 2021 | |
| Greater Bendigo, City of | No | The City of Greater Bendigo has not declared an emergency but in 2019 voted to "recognise and urgently respond" to environmental and climate breakdown. The council has since argued that the vote was equivalent to an emergency declaration and that it tied council spending to risks surrounding climate change. | |
| Greater Dandenong, City of | Yes | 15 January 2020 | |
| Greater Geelong, City of | No | Motion to declare climate emergency rejected on 26 September 2019 | |
| Greater Shepparton, City of | Yes | 3 June 2020 | |
| Hepburn, Shire of | Yes | 19 September 2019 | |
| Hindmarsh, Shire of | No | N/A | |
| Hobsons Bay, City of | Yes | 8 October 2019 | |
| Horsham, Rural City of | No | N/A | |
| Hume, City of | No | N/A | |
| Indigo, Shire of | Yes | 1 August 2019 | |
| Kingston, City of | Yes | 28 January 2020 | |
| Knox, City Council of | No | N/A | |
| Latrobe, City Council of | No | N/A | |
| Loddon, Shire of | No | N/A | |
| Macedon Ranges, Shire of | Yes | 24 March 2021 | |
| Manningham, City Council of | Yes | 10 February 2020 | |
| Mansfield, Shire of | No | N/A | |
| Maribyrnong, City Council of | Yes | 7 March 2019 | |
| Maroondah, City Council of | No | N/A | |
| Melbourne, City Council of | Yes | 17 July 2019 | |
| Melton, City Council of | No | N/A | |
| Mildura Rural City Council | Yes | 27 February 2020 | |
| Mitchell, Shire of | Yes | 20 September 2021 (acknowledged) | |
| Moira, Shire of | No | N/A | |
| Monash, City of | No | N/A | |
| Moonee Valley City Council | Yes | October 2019 | |
| Moorabool, Shire of | No | N/A | |
| Merri-bek, City Council of | Yes | 12 December 2018 | For operational emissions, Moreland Council was certified as ‘carbon neutral’ in 2012. City of Moreland has set a community emissions reduction target of net zero emissions by 2040. |
| Mornington Peninsula, Shire of | Yes | The Shire of Mornington Peninsula was the 34th local government authority in Australia to declare a climate emergency on 13 August 2019 | Mornington Peninsula council has a target of zero carbon emissions by 2040. |
| Mount Alexander, Shire of | Yes | 19 December 2019 | |
| Moyne, Shire of | Yes | 7 November 2019 | |
| Murrindindi, Shire of | No | N/A | |
| Nillumbik, Shire of | No | N/A | |
| [[Shire of Northern Grampians }|Northern Grampians, Shire of]] | No | N/A | |
| Port Phillip, City of | Yes | 19 September 2019 | |
| Pyrenees, Shire of | No | N/A | |
| Queenscliffe, Borough of | Yes | 19 December 2019 | |
| South Gippsland Shire | No | N/A | |
| Southern Grampians, Shire of | No | N/A | |
| Stonnington, City of | Yes | 17 February 2020 | |
| Strathbogie, Shire of | Yes | 22 April 2021 | |
| Surf Coast Shire | Yes | 2 September 2019 | |
| Swan Hill, Rural City of | No | N/A | |
| Towong, Shire of | No | N/A | |
| Wangaratta, Rural City of | No | N/A | |
| Warrnambool, City of | No | N/A | |
| Wellington, Shire of | No | N/A | |
| West Wimmera, Shire of | No | N/A | |
| Whitehorse City Council | No | N/A | |
| Whitlesea, City of | No | N/A | |
| Wodonga City Council | No | N/A | |
| Wyndham City Council | No | N/A | |
| Yarra City Council | Yes | 2017 | |
| Yarra Ranges Shire Council | Yes | 10 September 2019 | |
| Yarriambiack Shire Council | No | N/A | |

=== Western Australia ===
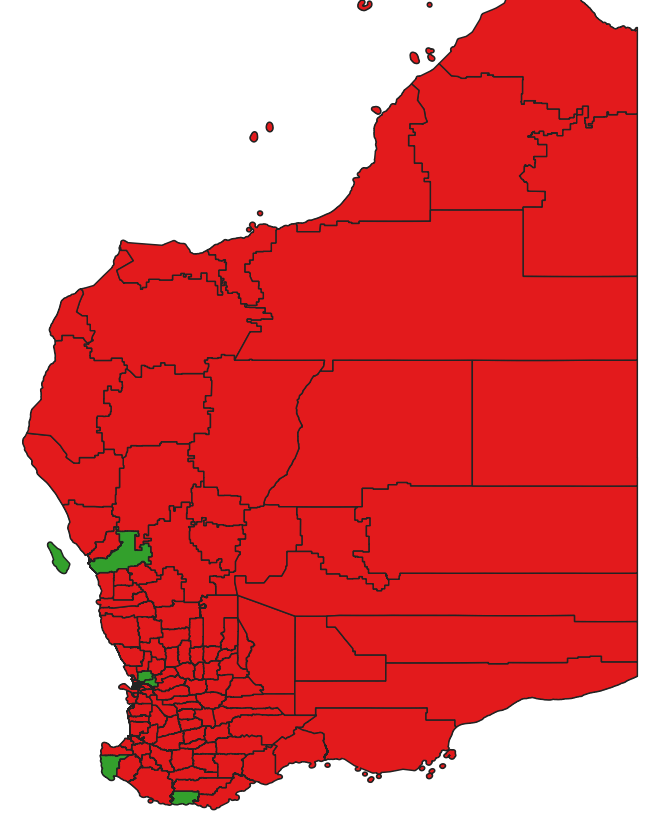
Climate Emergencies Declared by Local Government Areas in Western Australia

11 local government jurisdictions in Western Australia have declared a climate emergency. Additionally, the Western Australian Local Government Association (WALGA) has created a Climate Change Declaration that has been signed by 40 of Western Australia's local government associations, representing 65% of the state's local jurisdictions. The Climate Change Declaration is not a declaration of a climate emergency but does mention urgent action on climate change. The Western Local Government area of the City of Perth is one of two capital city Local Government Areas that have not declared a climate emergency.

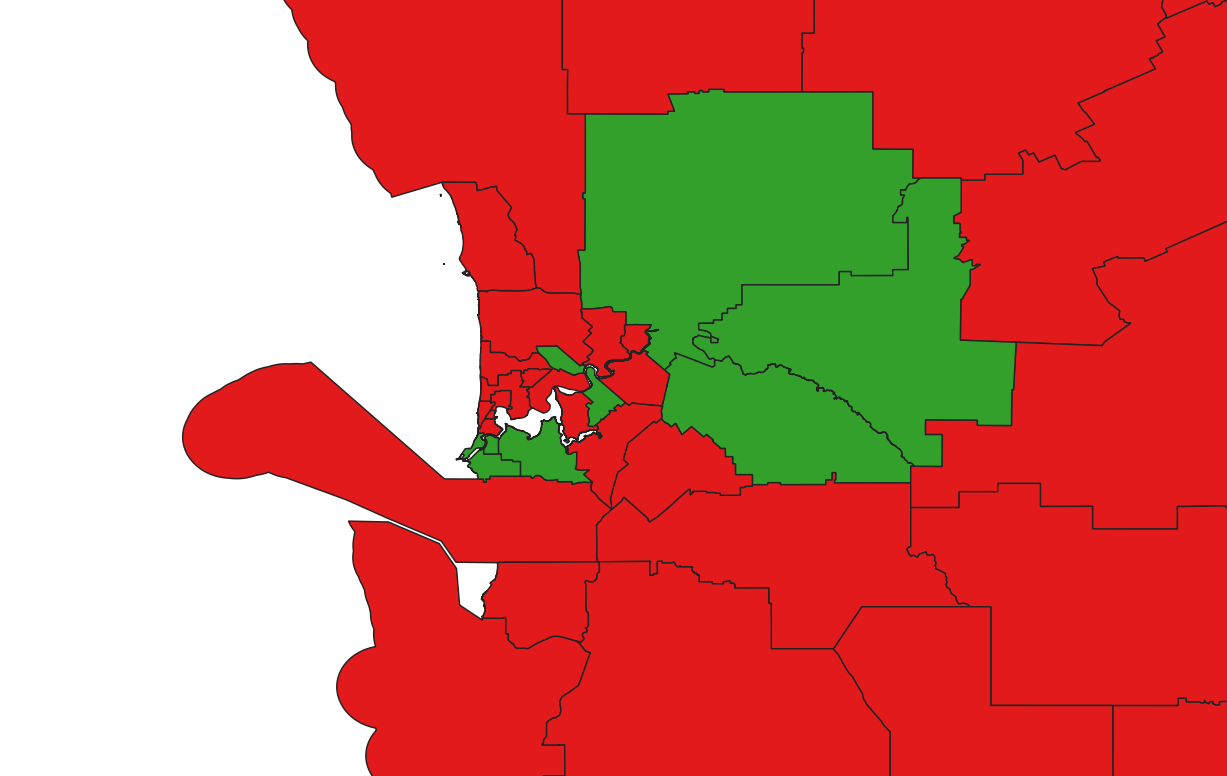
Climate Emergencies Declared by Metropolitan Local Government Areas in Western Australia

| Council | Climate Emergency Declared | Date | WALGA Declaration |
|---|---|---|---|
| Albany, City of | No | The City of Albany has not declared a climate emergency but has signed a climate action declaration with the goal of the City using 100% renewables by 2030. This document is similar to a climate emergency declaration but does not refer to climate change as an emergency. | No |
| Armadale, City of | No | N/A | Yes |
| Ashburton, Shire of | No | N/A | Yes |
| Augusta–Margaret River, Shire of | Yes | 25 September 2019 | No |
| Bassendean, Town of | No | N/A | Yes |
| Bayswater, City of | No | N/A | Yes |
| Belmont, City of | No | N/A | Yes |
| Beverley, Shire of | No | N/A | No |
| Boddington, Shire of | No | N/A | Yes |
| Boyup Brook, Shire of | No | N/A | No |
| Bridgetown–Greenbushes, Shire of | No | N/A | No |
| Brookton, Shire of | No | N/A | Yes |
| Broome, Shire of | No | N/A | No |
| Broomehill–Tambellup, Shire of | No | N/A | No |
| Bruce Rock, Shire of | No | N/A | No |
| Bunbury, City of | No | N/A | Yes |
| Busselton, City of | No | N/A | No |
| Cambridge, Town of | No | N/A | Yes |
| Canning, City of | No | N/A | Yes |
| Capel, Shire of | No | N/A | No |
| Carnamah, Shire of | No | N/A | No |
| Carnarvon, Shire of | No | N/A | Yes |
| Chapman Valley, Shire of | No | N/A | No |
| Chittering, Shire of | No | N/A | No |
| Christmas Island, Shire of | No | N/A | No |
| Claremont, Town of | No | N/A | No |
| Cockburn, City of | No | N/A | Yes |
| Cocos, Shire of | No | N/A | No |
| Collie, Shire of | No | N/A | No |
| Coolgardie, Shire of | No | N/A | No |
| Coorow, Shire of | No | N/A | No |
| Corrigin, Shire of | No | N/A | No |
| Cottesloe, Town of | No | N/A | Yes |
| Cranbrook, Shire of | No | N/A | No |
| Cuballing, Shire of | No | N/A | No |
| Cue, Shire of | No | N/A | No |
| Cunderdin, Shire of | No | N/A | No |
| Dalwallinu, Shire of | No | N/A | No |
| Dandaragan, Shire of | No | N/A | Yes |
| Dardanup, Shire of | No | N/A | No |
| Denmark, Shire of | Yes | 17 September 2019 | Yes |
| Derby–West Kimberley, Shire of | No | N/A | No |
| Donnybrook–Balingup, Shire of | No | N/A | No |
| Dowerin, Shire of | No | N/A | No |
| Dumbleyung, Shire of | No | N/A | No |
| Dundas, Shire of | No | N/A | No |
| East Fremantle, Town of | Yes | 19 November 2019 | Yes |
| East Pilbara, Shire of | No | N/A | No |
| Esperance, Shire of | No | N/A | No |
| Exmouth, Shire of | No | N/A | No |
| Fremantle, City of | Yes | 22 May 2019 | Yes |
| Gingin, Shire of | No | N/A | No |
| Gnowangerup, Shire of | No | N/A | No |
| Goomalling, Shire of | No | N/A | Yes |
| Gosnells, City of | No | N/A | No |
| Greater Geraldton, City of | Yes | 16 December 2020 | Yes |
| Halls Creek, Shire of | No | N/A | No |
| Harvey, Shire of | No | N/A | No |
| Irwin, Shire of | No | N/A | Yes |
| Jerramungup, Shire of | No | N/A | No |
| Joondalup, City of | No | N/A | Yes |
| Kalamunda, City of | Yes | 25 May 2021 | Yes |
| Kalgoorlie–Boulder, City of | No | N/A | No |
| Karratha, City of | No | N/A | No |
| Katanning, Shire of | No | N/A | No |
| Kellerberrin, Shire of | No | N/A | No |
| Kent, Shire of | No | N/A | No |
| Kojonup, Shire of | No | N/A | No |
| Kondinin, Shire of | No | N/A | No |
| Koorda, Shire of | No | N/A | No |
| Kulin, Shire of | No | N/A | No |
| Kwinana, City of | No | N/A | No |
| Lake Grace, Shire of | No | N/A | No |
| Laverton, Shire of | No | N/A | No |
| Leonora, Shire of | No | N/A | No |
| Mandurah, City of | No | N/A | Yes |
| Manjimup, Shire of | No | N/A | No |
| Meekatharra, Shire of | No | N/A | No |
| Melville, City of | Yes | 15 June 2021 | Yes |
| Menzies, Shire of | No | N/A | No |
| Merredin, Shire of | No | N/A | Yes |
| Mingenew, Shire of | No | N/A | No |
| Moora, Shire of | No | N/A | No |
| Morawa, Shire of | No | N/A | No |
| Mosman Park, Town of | No | N/A | Yes |
| Mount Magnet, Shire of | No | N/A | No |
| Mount Marshall, Shire of | No | N/A | No |
| Mukinbudin, Shire of | No | N/A | No |
| Mundaring, Shire of | Yes | 10 December 2019 | No |
| Murchison, Shire of | No | N/A | No |
| Murray, Shire of | No | N/A | Yes |
| Nannup, Shire of | No | N/A | No |
| Narembeen, Shire of | No | N/A | No |
| Narrogin, Shire of | No | N/A | No |
| Nedlands, City of | No | N/A | Yes |
| Ngaanyatjarraku, Shire of | No | N/A | No |
| Northam, Shire of | No | N/A | No |
| Northampton, Shire of | No | N/A | No |
| Nungarin, Shire of | No | N/A | No |
| Peppermint Grove, Shire of | No | N/A | No |
| Perenjori, Shire of | No | N/A | Yes |
| Perth, City of | No | N/A | No |
| Pingelly, Shire of | No | N/A | No |
| Plantagenet, Shire of | No | N/A | No |
| Port Hedland, Town of | No | N/A | No |
| Quairading, Shire of | No | N/A | Yes |
| Ravensthorpe, Shire of | No | N/A | No |
| Rockingham, City of | No | N/A | Yes |
| Sandstone, Shire of | No | N/A | No |
| Serpentine–Jarrahdale, Shire of | No | N/A | No |
| Shark Bay, Shire of | No | N/A | No |
| Stirling, City of | No | N/A | Yes |
| Subiaco, City of | No | N/A | Yes |
| Swan, City of | Yes | 28 August 2019 | Yes |
| Tammin, Shire of | No | N/A | No |
| Three Springs, Shire of | No | N/A | No |
| Toodyay, Shire of | No | N/A | Yes |
| Trayning, Shire of | No | N/A | No |
| Upper Gascoyne, Shire of | No | N/A | No |
| Victoria Park, Town of | Yes | 14 August 2018 | Yes |
| Victoria Plains, Shire of | No | N/A | No |
| Vincent, City of | Yes | 4 April 2018 | Yes |
| Wagin, Shire of | No | N/A | No |
| Wandering, Shire of | No | N/A | No |
| Wanneroo, City of | No | N/A | No |
| Waroona, Shire of | No | N/A | No |
| West Arthur, Shire of | No | N/A | No |
| Westonia, Shire of | No | N/A | No |
| Wickepin, Shire of | No | N/A | No |
| Williams, Shire of | No | N/A | No |
| Wiluna, Shire of | No | N/A | No |
| Wongan–Ballidu, Shire of | No | N/A | No |
| Woodanilling, Shire of | No | N/A | No |
| Wyalkatchem, Shire of | No | N/A | No |
| Wyndham East Kimberley, Shire of | No | N/A | No |
| Yalgoo, Shire of | No | N/A | No |
| Yilgarn, Shire of | No | N/A | No |
| York, Shire of | No | N/A | No |

== External Islands/Territories ==
No external islands or territories of Australia have declared a climate emergency.

External Islands/ Dependant Territories That Have Declared Climate Emergency
| Jurisdiction | Declared a Climate Emergency | Date |
|---|---|---|
| Ashmore and Cartier Islands | No | N/A |
| Christmas Island | No | N/A |
| Cocos (Keeling) Islands | No | N/A |
| Coral Sea Islands | No | N/A |
| Cocos (Keeling) Islands | No | N/A |
| Jervis Bay Territory | No | N/A |
| Heard Island and McDonald Islands | No | N/A |
| Norfolk Island | No | N/A |

== Declare Organisations in Australia ==
- Planners Declare
- Builders Declare
- Architects Declare
- Comms Declare

== Other notable non-government declarations ==
In September 2013, the Australian Medical Association officially declared climate change a public health emergency. The AMA noted that climate change will cause "higher mortality and morbidity from heat stress; injury and mortality from increasingly severe weather events; increases in the transmission of vector-borne diseases; food insecurity resulting from declines in agricultural outputs; [and] a higher incidence of mental-ill health." The AMA has called on the Australian Government to adopt a carbon budget; reduce emissions; and transition from fossil fuels to renewable energy, among other proposals to mitigate the health impacts of climate change.

== See also ==
- Environmental issues in Australia
- Environmental movement in Australia
