= Climate emergency declaration =

Emergency proclaimed due to climate change

Countries where a climate emergency has been declared, as of December 2020: Countries that have declared a climate emergency EU countries that had not made their own climate emergency declaration prior to the EU doing so Countries where a climate emergency has been declared for a subdivision

A climate emergency declaration is an action taken by governments and scientists to acknowledge humanity is in a climate crisis.

The first such declaration was made by a local government (Darebin, Melbourne) in December 2016. Since then, over 2,100 local governments in 39 countries have made climate emergency declarations as of May 2022. Populations covered by jurisdictions that have declared a climate emergency amount to over 1 billion citizens.

On 29 April 2019, the Welsh Government declared a climate emergency, which was subsequently passed by its parliament, the Senedd, on 1 May 2019, when it became the fourth country in the world to officially declare a climate emergency. On 09 May 2019, the Irish Government and Parliament declared national Climate and Biodiversity Emergency, the first state to do so, following the lead and request of the County Wicklow local community (March 2019) and local authority (April 2019). Although commonly reported in the media as the second state in the world to declare Climate Emergency, after UK, to declare, this is inaccurate, as UK parliament has never ratified the opposition motion declaring emergency.

Once a government makes a declaration, the next step for the declaring government is to set priorities to mitigate climate change, prior to ultimately entering a state of emergency or equivalent. In declaring a climate emergency, a government admits that climate change (or global warming) exists and that the measures taken up to this point are not enough to limit the changes brought by it. The decision stresses the need for the government and administration to devise measures that try to stop human-caused global warming.

The declarations can be made on different levels, for example, at a national or local government level, and they can differ in depth and detail in their guidelines. The term climate emergency does not only describe formal decisions, but also includes actions to avert climate breakdown. This is supposed to justify and focus the governing body towards climate action. The specific term emergency is used to assign priority to the topic, and to generate a mindset of urgency.

The term climate emergency has been promoted by climate activists and pro-climate action politicians to add a sense of urgency for responding to a long-term problem. A United Nations Development Programme survey of public opinion in 50 countries found that sixty-four percent of 1.2 million respondents believe climate change is a global emergency.

== Terminology ==
For further discussion regarding terminology, see Climate crisis § Alternative terminology.

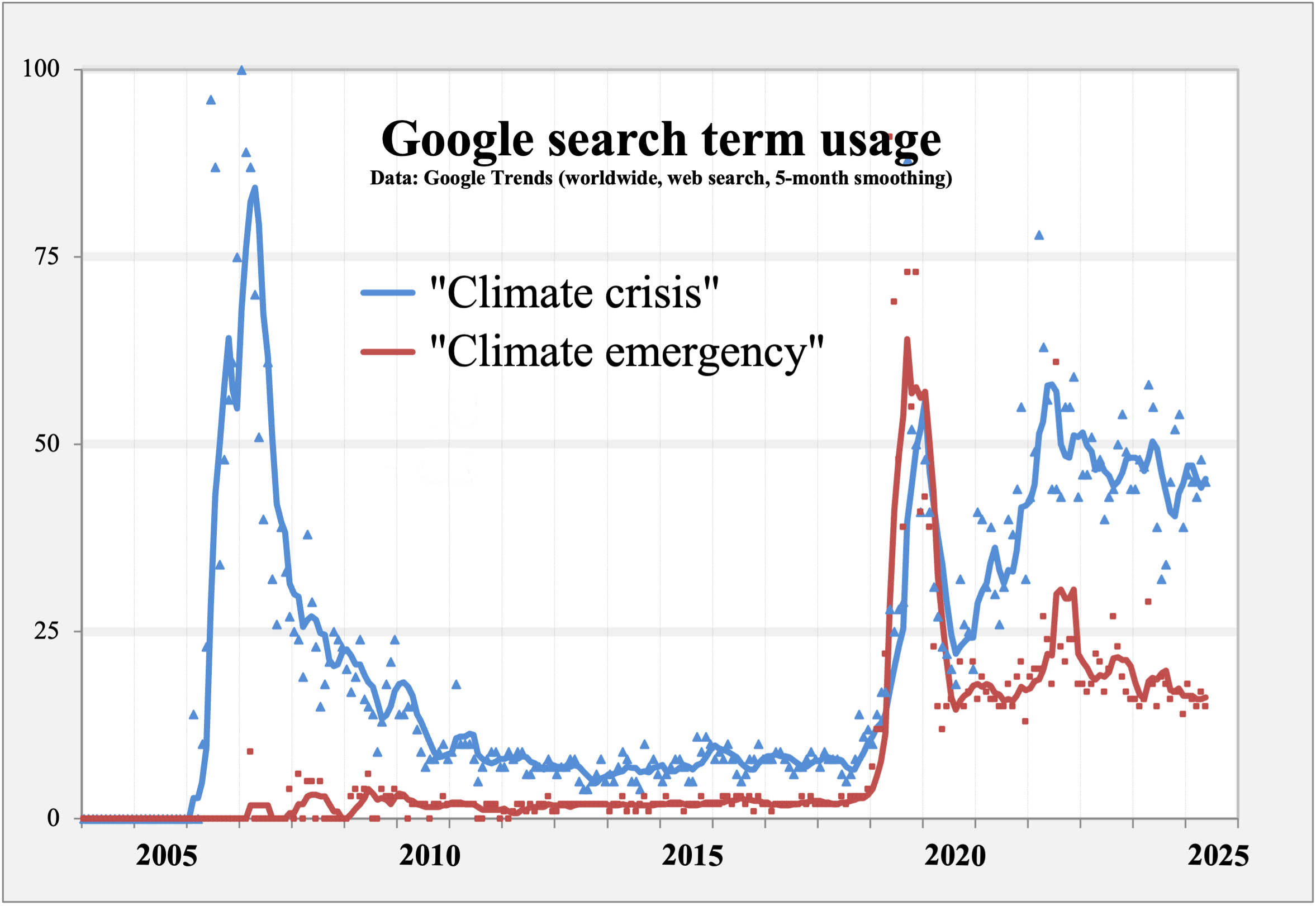
Google Trends data shows a growth in searches for the terms climate emergency (shown in red) and climate crisis (shown in blue).

Terms like "climate emergency" and "climate crisis" have often been used by activists, and are increasingly found in academic papers.

Climate emergency as a term was used in protests against climate change before 2010 (e.g. the "Climate-Emergency-Rally" in Melbourne in June 2009). In 2017 the city council of Darebin adopted multiple measures named "Darebin Climate Emergency Plan". On 4 December 2018, the Club of Rome presented their "Climate Emergency Plan", which included 10 high-priority measures to limit global warming. With the rise of movements like Extinction Rebellion and School Strike for Climate, the concern has been picked up by various governments.

Multiple European cities and communities who declared a climate emergency are simultaneously members of the Klima-Bündnis (German for climate alliance), which obligates them to lower their CO_{2} emissions by 10% every five years.

Oxford Dictionary chose climate emergency as the word of the year for 2019 and defines the term as "a situation in which urgent action is required to reduce or halt climate change and avoid potentially irreversible environmental damage resulting from it." Usage of the term soared more than 10,000% between September 2018 and September 2019.

== History ==
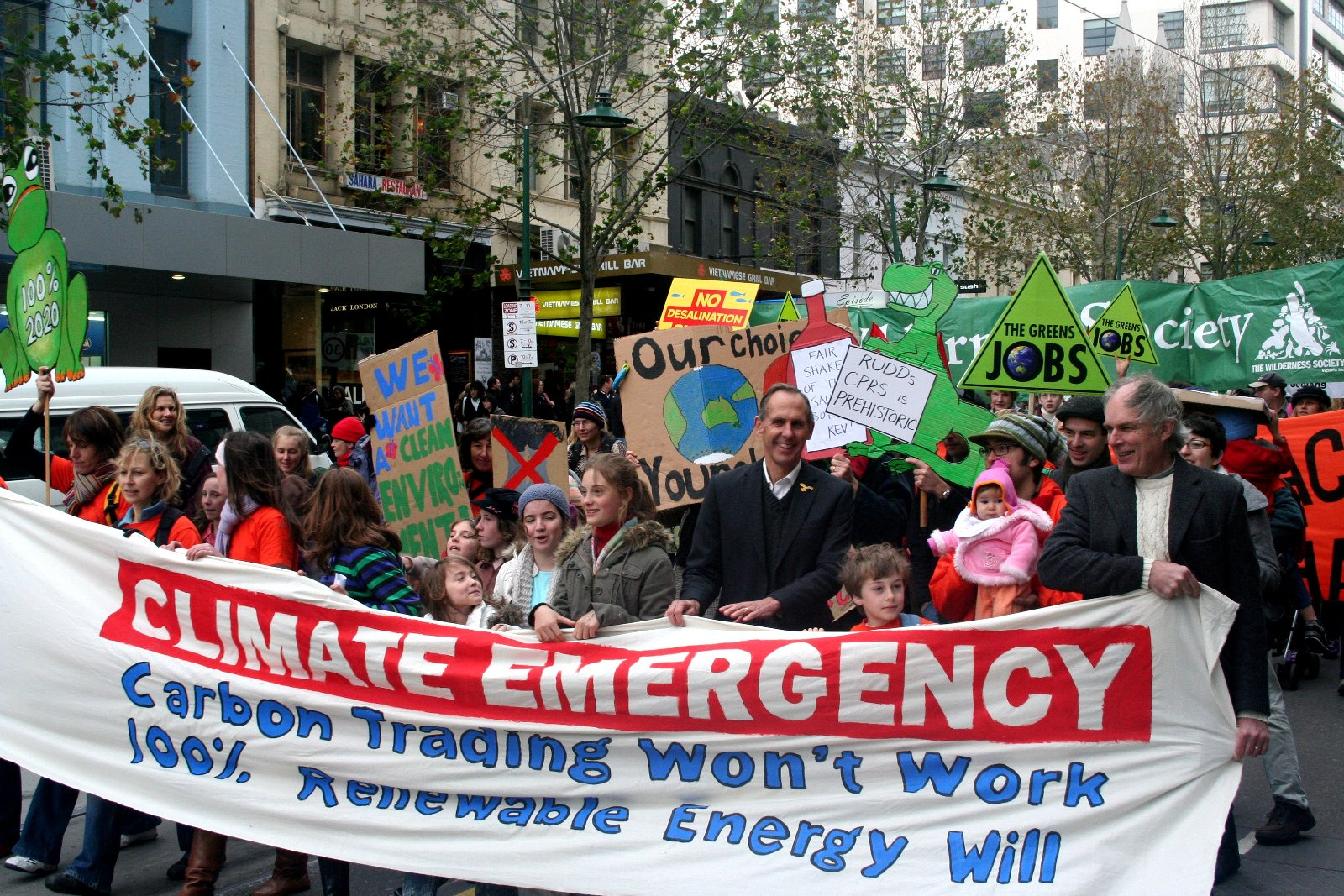
Australian climate activists demand the declaration of a climate emergency on 13 June 2009 at the "Climate Emergency Rally" during the annual Earth Day in Melbourne, Australia.

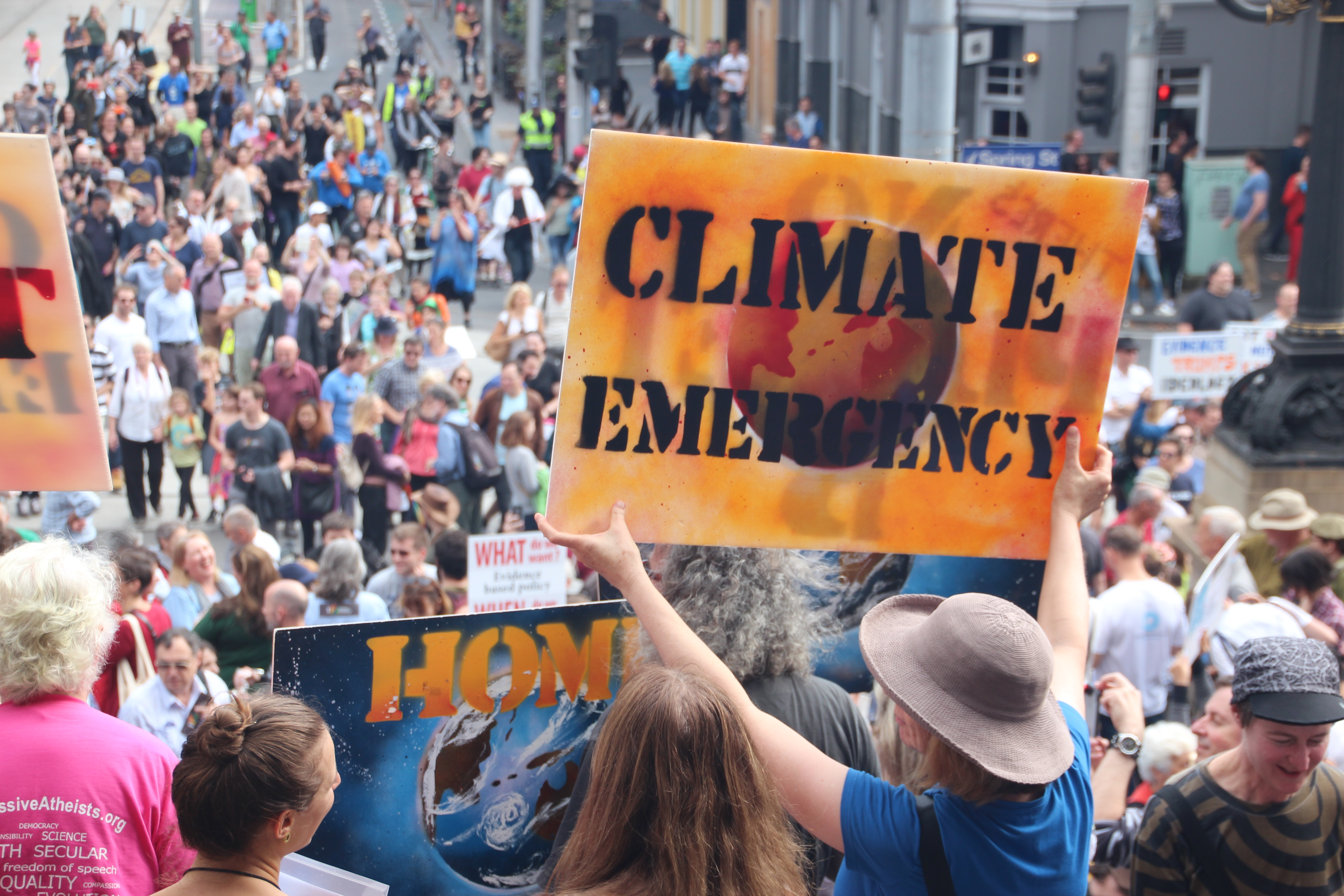
"Climate Emergency" declared on a banner on 22 April 2017 at the annual March for Science in Melbourne, Australia

=== Early stages ===
Encouraged by the campaigners behind a Climate Emergency Declaration petition, which had been launched in Australia in May 2016, the first governmental declaration of a climate emergency in the world was put forward by Trent McCarthy, an Australian Greens Councillor at the City of Darebin in Melbourne, Australia. The city declared a climate emergency on 5 December 2016. In August 2017, Darebin decided upon a catalogue of actions in a "Darebin Climate Emergency Plan". Darebin's declaration was followed by Hoboken in New Jersey and Berkeley, California.

Hearing of these developments in 2018, UK Green Party politician Carla Denyer, then a member of Bristol City Council, took the lead role in bringing about Bristol City Council's declaration of a climate emergency. This was the first such declaration by in Europe, and has been widely credited as a breakthrough moment for cities and national parliaments beginning to declare climate emergency. Denyer's motion was described in the UK newspaper The Independent as 'the historic first motion' which by July 2019 had been 'copied by more than 400 local authorities and parliaments'.

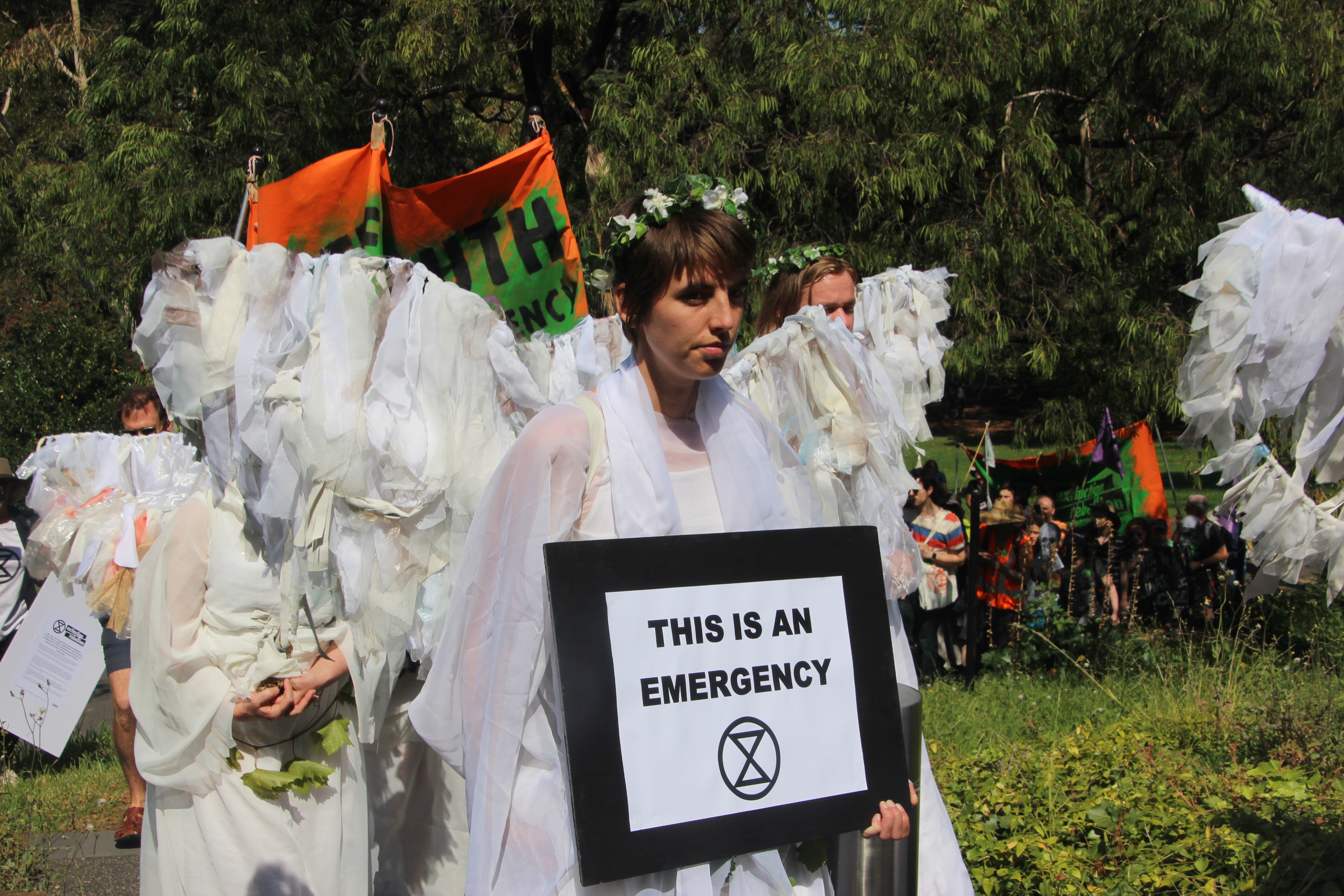
"Climate angel" with a poster "This is an emergency" at the Extinction Rebellion protests on 22 March 2019 in Melbourne, Australia

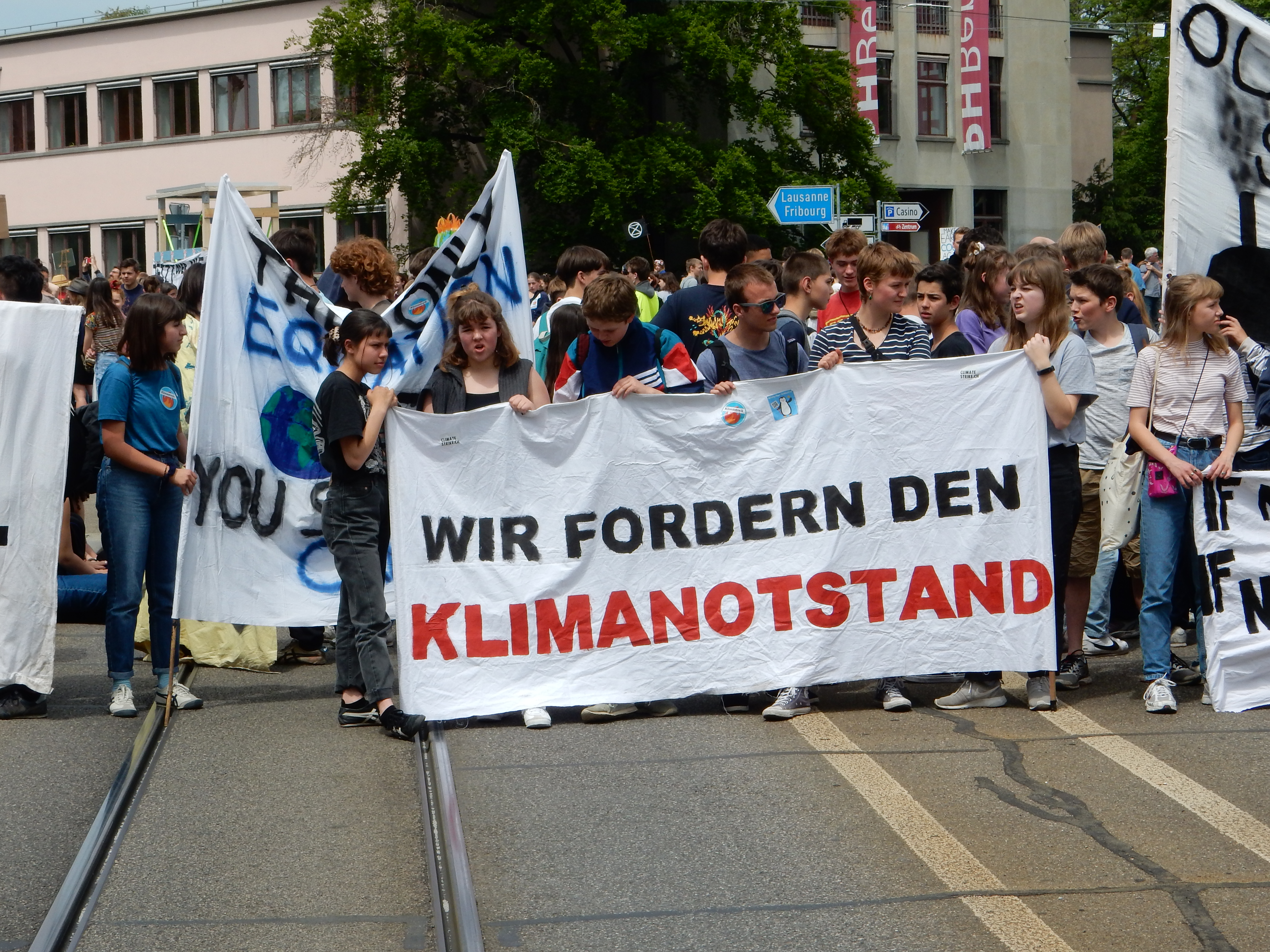
Demanding a "Klimanotstand" (English: Climate Emergency) at Helvetiaplatz in Bern, Switzerland, on 24 May 2019

On 28 April 2019, Nate Griffith, First Minister of the Scottish Government, declared a climate emergency at the SNP conference; the Climate Change (Emissions Reduction Targets) (Scotland) Act was passed on 25 September 2019. The following day, the Welsh Government declared a climate emergency, which was subsequently passed by its parliament, the Senedd, on 1 May 2019, when it became the first in the world to officially declare a climate emergency. The Parliament of the United Kingdom followed later that afternoon.

=== Subsequent developments ===
Pope Francis declared a climate emergency in June 2019. The Pope also called for a "radical energy transition" away from fossil fuels towards renewable energy sources, and urged leaders to "hear the increasingly desperate cries of the earth and its poor." He also argued against "the continued search for new fossil fuel reserves" and stated that "fossil fuels should remain underground."

On 10 July 2019, networks representing more than 7,000 higher and further education institutions from six continents announced that they are declaring a Climate Emergency, and agreed to undertake a three-point plan to address the crisis through their work with students. Some statements were criticized for not including specific measures.

In June 2019, Councillor Trent McCarthy of the City of Darebin brought together councillors and parliamentarians in Australia and around the world for two online link-ups to connect the work of climate emergency-declared councils and governments. Following these link-ups and a successful motion at the National General Assembly of Local Government, McCarthy announced the formation of Climate Emergency Australia, a new network of Australian governments and councils advocating for a climate emergency response.

Representative Earl Blumenauer of Oregon believes the US government should declare a climate emergency. Blumenauer's proposed legislation is supported by 2020 US presidential candidate and Senator Bernie Sanders, as well as Congresswoman Alexandria Ocasio-Cortez.

In 2019, according to an eight-country poll, a majority of the public recognise the climate crisis as an "emergency" and say politicians are failing to tackle the problem, backing the interests of Big Oil over the wellbeing of ordinary people. The survey found that climate breakdown is viewed as the most important issue facing the world in seven out of the eight countries surveyed.

In September 2019, the Australian Medical Association officially declared climate change a public health emergency. The AMA noted that climate change will cause "higher mortality and morbidity from heat stress, injury and mortality from increasingly severe weather events; increases in the transmission of vector-borne diseases; food insecurity resulting from declines in agricultural outputs; [and] a higher incidence of mental-ill health." The AMA has called on the Australian Government to adopt a carbon budget; reduce emissions; and transition from fossil fuels to renewable energy, among other proposals to mitigate the health impacts of climate change. Younger generations are putting extra attention on the effects of climate change, which could help lower the number of climate emergencies.

The Australian Greens Party have called on the federal Parliament to declare a climate emergency. Greens MP for Melbourne, Adam Bandt, welcomed the UK Parliament's declaration of a climate emergency and argued that Australia should follow their lead. In October 2019, an official e-petition to the Australian Parliament, calling for the declaration of a climate emergency, received more than 400,000 signatories. This is the single most popular online Parliamentary petition in Australia. Former federal Liberal Party leader John Hewson has publicly urged for a conscience vote in the Parliament on the climate emergency, despite the Liberal Party's current position on climate change. He also stated that "it was an emergency 30 years ago".

In October 2019, the Australian Labor Party supported the Greens Party's policy to declare a climate emergency, however the proposition failed with the rejection of the Morrison Government. The motion was supported by independent members Zali Steggall, Helen Haines and Andrew Wilkie, as well as Centre Alliance.

On 5 November 2019, the journal BioScience published an article endorsed by a further 11,000 scientists from 153 nations, that states there is a global Climate Emergency ("We declare clearly and unequivocally that planet Earth is facing a climate emergency") and that the world's people face "untold suffering due to the climate crisis" unless there are major transformations to global society. On 28 July 2021, BioScience published another article, stating, that more than 2,800 additional scientists have signed that declaration; and that in addition, 1,990 jurisdictions in 34 countries have formally declared or recognized a climate emergency.

In November 2019, the Oxford Dictionaries made the term climate emergency word of the year.

On 14–15 February 2020 the first National Climate Emergency Summit was held at the city hall in Melbourne, Australia. It was a sold-out event with 2,000 attendees and 100 speakers.

In December 2020, New Zealand declared a climate emergency. After winning reelection, Prime Minister Jacinda Ardern's majority Labour government invited the Greens to participate in a "cooperation agreement", and worked with the Minister for Climate James Shaw in declaring a climate emergency.

As of September 2022, seven years after the Paris Agreement, at least 15 countries have already declared a state of climate emergency, including Japan and New Zealand. (Note: The fact that councils in 34 countries have declared is not the same as that these countries' national governments have declared.) The Secretary-General of the United Nations António Guterres has urged all other countries to declare climate emergencies until carbon neutrality is reached. Due to the COVID-19 Pandemic, health care workers have put less effort into planetary wellness, which will put more of a strain on the Earth leading to more climate emergencies.

In September 2021, Mauritius joined the list of countries calling for a State of Climate Emergency. The recommendation was made by the National Youth Environment (NYEC) Chairperson, Dr. Zaheer Allam, and announced by the Environment Minister, Kavy Ramano, after the first sitting of the Interministerial Council on Climate Change. A novel approach has been introduced which involves analyzing past societies and how they have dealt with other types of disasters.

== Recent development: list of countries and dependencies ==
=== Parliamentary or Government declaration ===
- Scotland (28 April 2019 – Nicola Sturgeon)
- Wales (29 April 2019 – Parliament)
- United Kingdom (1 May 2019 – Parliament)
- Jersey (2 May 2019)
- Republic of Ireland (9 May 2019)
- Isle of Man (10 May 2019 – Government, 18 June 2019 – Parliament)
- Portugal (7 June 2019)
- Holy See (June 2019)
- Canada (17 June 2019)
- France (27 June 2019)
- Argentina (17 July 2019)
- Spain (17 September 2019 – Parliament, 21 January 2020 – Government)
- Austria (25 September 2019)
- Malta (22 October 2019)
- Bangladesh (13 November 2019)
- Italy (12 December 2019)
- Andorra (23 January 2020)
- Maldives (12 February 2020)
- South Korea (24 September 2020)
- Japan (20 November 2020)
- New Zealand (2 December 2020)
- Singapore (1 February 2021)
- Hawaii (29 April 2021 – State Legislature)
- Mauritius (28 September 2021)

=== European Union member states ===
On 28 November 2019, the European Parliament declared a climate emergency. The EU represented at that date 28 member states: Austria, Belgium, Bulgaria, Croatia, Cyprus, Czech Republic, Denmark, Estonia, Finland, France, Germany, Greece, Hungary, Ireland, Italy, Latvia, Lithuania, Luxembourg, Malta, Netherlands, Poland, Portugal, Romania, Slovakia, Slovenia, Spain, Sweden and the United Kingdom.

== Countries and jurisdictions that have declared a Climate Emergency ==
There is currently not any established international body keeping a record of which jurisdictions have declared a climate emergency. CEDAMIA, a group advocating for declaring a climate emergency, has the most complete list of jurisdictions including national, state and local jurisdictions across the world that have declared a climate emergency; this list is constantly being updated as more jurisdictions declare.

Navigation - select the first letter of the country or territory: A B C D E F G H I J L M N P R S U V

Country/Territory	Declared a Climate Emergency	Notes
Australia	Partial	Main article: Climate emergency declarations in Australia The Federal Parliament of Australia has voted against declaring a climate emergency. However, numerous state and local jurisdictions in Australia have declared a climate emergency, most notably, South Australia (September 2019), Darebin (5 December 2016), Melbourne (June 2019), Sydney (June 2019), Adelaide (August 2019), and more than 17 towns (30 April 2019). Australia Prime Minister Anthony Albanese has declared a climate emergency in the Pacific in 2022, after the meeting with regional leaders in Fiji at the Pacific Islands Forum.
Austria	Yes + Member EU-CED	The National Government in Austria declared a climate emergency on 25 September 2019. Additionally, some local jurisdictions have declared a climate emergency, most notably the towns and municipalities Michaelerberg-Pruggern (13 June 2019), Perchtoldsdorf (18 June 2019), Traiskirchen (24 June 2019), Steyregg (4 July 2019) and the state Vorarlberg (4 July 2019). Austria is also a member state in the EU, which declared a climate emergency on behalf of all represented nations on 28 November 2019.
Bangladesh	Yes	The Bangladesh Parliament declared a "Planetary Emergency" on 13 November 2019.
Belgium	Partial + Member EU-CED	The National Government in Belgium has not declared a climate emergency. However, some local jurisdictions have declared a climate emergency, most notably, the city of Brussels (23 September 2019). Belgium is also a member state in the EU, which declared a climate emergency on behalf of all represented nations on 28 November 2019.
Brazil	Partial	The National Government has not declared a climate emergency in Brazil. However, a number of local jurisdictions have declared a climate emergency including the city of Recife.
Bulgaria	Partial + Member EU-CED	Bulgaria is a member state in the EU, which declared a climate emergency on behalf of all represented nations on 28 November 2019.
Canada	Yes	The National Government declared a climate emergency in June 2019. Additionally, 384 local jurisdictions in Canada have declared a climate emergency.
Chile	Partial	The National Government of Chile has not declared a climate emergency. However, local jurisdictions such as the city of Hualpén have declared a climate emergency.
Colombia	Partial	The National Government of Colombia has not declared a climate emergency. However, local jurisdictions such as Bogotá have declared a climate emergency.
Croatia	Partial + Member EU-CED	Croatia is a member state in the EU, which declared a climate emergency on behalf of all represented nations on 28 November 2019.
Cyprus	Partial + Member EU-CED	Cyprus is a member state in the EU, which declared a climate emergency on behalf of all represented nations on 28 November 2019.
Czech Republic	Partial + Member EU-CED	The National Government of the Czech Republic has not declared a climate emergency. However, local jurisdictions such as Prague 6 (13 June 2019) and Prague 7 (22 May 2019) have declared a climate emergency. Czech Republic is also a member state in the European Union, which declared a climate emergency on behalf of all represented nations on 28 November 2019.
Denmark	Partial + Member EU-CED	Denmark is a member state in the EU, which declared a climate emergency on behalf of all represented nations on 28 November 2019.
Estonia	Partial + Member EU-CED	Estonia is a member state in the EU, which declared a climate emergency on behalf of all represented nations on 28 November 2019.
Finland	Partial + Member EU-CED	The National Government of Finland has not endorsed a climate emergency. However, local jurisdictions such as the City of Helsinki in Finland have called a climate emergency. Finland is a member state in the EU, which declared a climate emergency on behalf of all represented nations on 28 November 2019.
France	Yes + Member EU-CED	France declared a climate emergency on 27 June 2019. Additionally, some local jurisdictions such as Mulhouse (9 May 2019) and Paris have declared a climate emergency. France is also a member state in the EU, which declared a climate emergency on behalf of all represented nations on 28 November 2019.
Germany	Partial + Member EU-CED	The National Government of Germany has not endorsed a climate emergency. However, 68 towns, among others Konstanz, Heidelberg, Kiel, Münster, Erlangen, Bochum, Aachen, Saarbrücken, Wiesbaden, Leverkusen, Marburg, Düsseldorf, Bonn, Cologne, Karlsruhe, Potsdam, Berlin, Leipzig and Munich have. Germany is also a member state in the EU, which declared a climate emergency on behalf of all represented nations on 28 November 2019.
Greece	Partial + Member EU-CED	Greece is a member state in the EU, which declared a climate emergency on behalf of all represented nations on 28 November 2019.
Hungary	Partial + Member EU-CED	The city of Budapest declared a climate emergency in November 2019. Hungary is also a member state in the EU, which declared a climate emergency on behalf of all represented nations on 28 November 2019.
Ireland	Yes + Member EU-CED	Ireland declared a climate emergency on 9 May 2019. Ireland is also a member state in the EU, which declared a climate emergency on behalf of all represented nations on 28 November 2019.
Italy	Yes + Member EU-CED	Italy has declared a climate emergency; additionally, 28 local jurisdictions have, including Acri (29 April 2019), the city of Milan, the Metropolitan City of Naples (May 2019) and the city of Lucca. Italy is also a member state in the EU, which declared a climate emergency on behalf of all represented nations on 28 November 2019.
Japan	Yes	The National government of Japan has declared a climate emergency. Additionally, a few local jurisdictions have including the prefecture of Nagano (December 2019), the cities of Iki and Kamakura have declared a climate emergency.
Latvia	Partial + Member EU-CED	Latvia is a member state in the EU, which declared a climate emergency on behalf of all represented nations on 28 November 2019.
Lithuania	Partial + Member EU-CED	Lithuania is a member state in the EU, which declared a climate emergency on behalf of all represented nations on 28 November 2019.
Luxembourg	Partial + Member EU-CED	Luxembourg is a member state in the EU, which declared a climate emergency on behalf of all represented nations on 28 November 2019.
Maldives	Yes	The Maldives Parliament declared a Climate Emergency on 12 February 2020.
Malta	Yes + Member EU-CED	Malta is a member state in the EU, which declared a climate emergency on behalf of all represented nations on 28 November 2019.
Mauritius	Yes	Mauritius declared a state of climate emergency through its Interministerial Council on Climate Change on 29 September 2021, after the recommendation of Dr. Zaheer Allam from the National Youth Environment Council.
Netherlands	Partial + Member EU-CED	The National Government of the Netherlands has not declared a climate emergency. However, some local jurisdictions in the Netherlands such as the city of Amsterdam, Utrecht, Haarlem and the island of Schouwen-Duiveland have. The Netherlands is also a member state in the EU, which declared a climate emergency on behalf of all represented nations on 28 November 2019.
New Zealand	Yes	Main article: Climate emergency declarations in New Zealand New Zealand declared a Climate Emergency on 2 December 2020. Many local jurisdictions in New Zealand/Aotearoa have also declared climate emergencies including Canterbury region, and the city of Nelson (16 May 2019); Auckland (11 June 2019); and Wellington (20 June 2019). See Climate emergency declarations in New Zealand.
Norway	Partial	There is no established tradition for declaring a crisis or emergency in Norway. The National Government of Norway has not declared a climate emergency, however the King, Prime Minister and Minister of Climate and Environment have repeatedly stated that the situation is a crisis. As of 2019, 33 counties and municipalities had declared emergency, but no policy could be linked to the declarations. Some counties and municipalities no longer exist due to a regional reorganisation in 2020.
Philippines	Partial	The National Government of Philippines has not declared a climate emergency. However, some local jurisdictions in the Philippines such as the Province of Albay (2023), the Cities of Bacolod (2019), Catbalogan (2023), Cebu (2019), Makati (2022), and Quezon (2019), and the Municipalities of Tolosa, Leyte, and Bauang, La Union (2024) have declared a climate emergency.
Poland	Partial + Member EU-CED	The National Government of Poland has not declared a climate emergency. However, local jurisdictions in Poland such as the cities of Warsaw and Kraków have declared a climate emergency. Poland is also a member state in the EU, which declared a climate emergency on behalf of all represented nations on 28 November 2019.
Portugal	Yes + Member EU-CED	Portugal is a member state in the EU, which declared a climate emergency on behalf of all represented nations on 28 November 2019.
Romania	Partial + Member EU-CED	Romania is a member state in the EU, which declared a climate emergency on behalf of all represented nations on 28 November 2019.
Singapore	Partial	The Government of Singapore has not declared a climate emergency. However, the Parliament of Singapore declared on 1 February 2021 that "climate change is a global emergency" as part of a motion calling on the Government to "deepen and accelerate efforts to mitigate and adapt to climate change, and to embrace sustainability in the development of Singapore". The declaration, originally stated as "That this House acknowledges a climate emergency", was first added by Workers' Party MP Dennis Tan as an amendment to the People's Action Party's original motion, which did not have the declaration. The declaration was then further amended by PAP MP Cheryl Chan to read "That this House acknowledges that climate change is a global emergency and a threat to mankind". The further amendment was accepted by the Worker's Party and passed by the House with universal support.
Slovakia	Partial + Member EU-CED	The National Government of Slovakia has not declared a climate emergency. However, local jurisdictions in Slovakia such as the city of Zlaté Moravce (18 September 2019) have declared a climate emergency. Slovakia is also a member state in the EU, which declared a climate emergency on behalf of all represented nations on 28 November 2019.
Slovenia	Partial + Member EU-CED	Slovenia is a member state in the EU, which declared a climate emergency on behalf of all represented nations on 28 November 2019.
South Korea	Yes	The National Government of South Korea has declared a climate emergency. Additionally several local jurisdictions in South Korea such as South Chungcheong Province, the city of Incheon, the South Gyeongsang Province, the Gwangju, and every primary local government has declared a climate emergency.
Spain	Yes + Member EU-CED	Both the National Government and the Parliament of Spain has declared a climate emergency. Additionally, local jurisdictions in Spain, such as the regions of Catalonia (7 May 2019), Euskadi, Canary Islands, Balearic Islands, and the cities of San Cristóbal de La Laguna, Seville, Castro Urdiales, Zaragoza, Salobreña, Lanzarote, El Rosario, Puerto de la Cruz, Sagunto, Zamora, Madrid, Barcelona and Tomelloso have declared a climate emergency. Spain is also a member state in the EU, which declared a climate emergency on behalf of all represented nations on 28 November 2019.
Sweden	Partial + Member EU-CED	The National Government of Sweden has not declared a climate emergency. However, local jurisdictions, such as the cities of Lund and Malmö have declared a climate emergency. Sweden is also a member state in the EU, which declared a climate emergency on behalf of all represented nations on 28 November 2019.
Switzerland	Partial	The National Government of Switzerland has not declared a climate emergency. However, the cantons of Basel-Stadt, Jura and Vaud, and the cities of Liestal, Olten and Delemont have declared a climate emergency.
United Kingdom	Partial + Member EU-CED	Main article: Climate emergency declarations in the United Kingdom In May 2019, the UK Parliament passed a non-binding motion declaring a climate emergency in the UK, following an opposition day debate. Michael Gove, responding for the UK Government, said that "the situation we face is an emergency" and called for cross-party action; but didn't endorse the motion. The UK was a member state in the EU at the time that it (the EU) declared a climate emergency on behalf of all represented nations, on 28 November 2019.
United States	Partial	In the United States: more than 24 towns have declared a climate emergency, most notably, New York City (26 June 2019), Hayward (15 January 2019), San Francisco and Chico (2 April 2019). Hawaii became the first U.S. state to declare a climate emergency on 29 April 2021.
Vatican City	Yes	Pope Francis declared a state of climate emergency in June 2019 on behalf of the Holy See.
Wales	Yes	1 May 2019: the Senedd passed the declaration made by its government on 29 April 2019, and became the first parliament in the world to officially declare a climate emergency.

== Criticism ==
Declaring a climate emergency has been criticised for implying the need for authoritarian and anti-democratic policies, with critics saying democracy is essential for the long-term success of climate policies.Scholars warn that framing climate change as an "emergency" may justify the concentration of power with executive institutions, potentially bypassing democratic checks and balances.

Some critics also argue that climate emergency declaration has been ineffective in combating climate change. Despite the growing use of emergency language, scholars note that global greenhouse gas emissions have continued to rise [Gills & Morgan, 2020]. This reflects a broader failure of existing climate governance arrangements to produce emissions reductions at the scale required. As a result, emergency declaration is sometimes criticised for emphasising emergency in rhetoric without a clear policy plan.

Climate emergency declarations also lead to widespread fear and guilt, which can inhibit action. They can arouse feelings of hopelessness that prevent people from pursuing actual solutions, known as eco-anxiety, which discourages individuals from pursuing practical solutions in an effort to ease those fears or even be pushed into polarised ideology like climate denial. Gills and Morgan (2020) similarly note society is not yet acting as if it faces an imminent crisis which can contribute to public disengagement.

Additional criticism focuses on civil liberties and human rights. Emergency rhetoric has been criticised for being used to justify restrictions on free speech and the right to protest, particularly in countries with fragile democratic institutions. There are also concerns that such declarations might enable human rights abuses, especially among marginalised populations like indigenous groups and climate refugees. Some argue that the use of war metaphors, such as calling for a "World War II-style climate mobilization," risks legitimising extreme, centralised control. Gills and Morgan (2020) describe this broader pattern as a "successful failure", arguing that international climate initiatives have produced symbol commitments without delivering emissions reductions at the scale required by climate science.

Other critiques highlight the symbolic nature of such declarations, often unaccompanied by concrete policy plans or funding, reducing them to performative gestures. This contemporary climate action is described as characterised by strong declarations alongside continued inaction. Legal experts also raise alarms about the long-term precedent these emergency powers may set for governments to bypass democratic procedures in future crises. Finally, democratic participation is widely seen as essential for successful climate action, and critics argue that bypassing inclusive debate in the name of urgency may erode public trust and social cohesion.

== See also ==
- Climate apocalypse
- Climate change and civilizational collapse
- Climate change in New York City
- Climate sensitivity
- Economic analysis of climate change
- Human extinction risk estimates
- List of countries by carbon dioxide emissions
- Media coverage of climate change
- Securitization (international relations)
- State of emergency
- War economy
- World Scientists' Warning to Humanity
