= Comms Declare =

Climate advocacy group

- Formation: Australia, 2020
- Type: Nonprofit organization
- Purpose: Climate Emergency advocacy group by professionals in advertising, marketing, public relations and media in Australia
- Region served: Australia
- Key people: Belinda Noble, Cally Jackson
- Website: Official website

Comms Declare is a climate advocacy group working in advertising, marketing, public relations, and media in Australia. It highlights actions needed to address the climate crisis.

The organisation was co-founded by former news journalist Belinda Noble and communications professional Cally Jackson in early 2020. Noble described fossil fuels as "the new tobacco" and claimed that agencies aligning with companies that profit from climate change will "lose their best staff as well as clients that want a climate-friendly supply chain". Comms Declare therefore advocates for the creative industries to move away from such companies.

As at late 2021 Comms Declare is made up of 300 marketing, PR, advertising and media professionals, as well as 80 organisations that have committed not to support companies contributing to the growth of fossil fuel emissions in Australia.

== Publications ==
- September 2021: The F-List 2021: 90 Ad and PR Companies Working for the Fossil Fuel Industry. Joint report with Clean Creatives, highlighting 90 advertising, marketing and PR firms that have influenced policy decisions that would have cut greenhouse gas emissions.
- November 2021: Fuelling Fantasies: How the ad world is hindering climate action and protecting our biggest polluters. Report based on a survey of 200 of Australia’s top agencies in 2020 and 2021.
