= Climate emergency declarations in New Zealand =

Climate emergency declarations have been made by multiple jurisdictions in New Zealand, including national, regional and territorial authorities. The first New Zealand's jurisdictions began to declare climate emergencies in 2019.

== National ==
New Zealand's national government declared a climate emergency on 2 December 2020. Additionally, the New Zealand Government has committed to becoming neutral by 2025.

=== Response from Greta Thunberg ===
On 14 December 2020, Swedish climate activist Greta Thunberg used Twitter to criticise the declaration as "virtue signalling", tweeting that New Zealand's Labour Government had only committed to reducing less than one percent of New Zealand's carbon emissions by 2025. In response, New Zealand Prime Minister Jacinda Ardern and climate change Minister James Shaw defended New Zealand's climate change declaration as only the start of the country's climate change mitigation goals.

== Regional councils ==
Regional Councils That Have Declared a Climate Emergency
Region name (name in Māori if different)	Regional council	Declared a Climate Emergency	Date
Auckland/Tāmaki-makau-rau	Auckland Council	Yes	11 June 2019
Bay of Plenty/Te Moana-a-Toi	Bay of Plenty Regional Council	Yes	27 June 2019
Canterbury/Waitaha	Canterbury Regional Council	Yes	16 May 2019
Gisborne/Te Tai Rāwhiti	Gisborne District Council	No	
Hawke's Bay/Te Matau-a-Māui	Hawke's Bay Regional Council	Yes	26 June 2019
Wellington/Te Whanga-nui-a-Tara	Greater Wellington Regional Council	Yes	21 August 2019
Manawatū-Whanganui	Horizons Regional Council	No	
Marlborough/Te Tauihu-o-te-waka	Marlborough District Council	No	
Nelson/Whakatū	Nelson City Council	Yes	16 May 2019
Northland/Te Tai Tokerau	Northland Regional Council	No	
Otago/Ōtākou	Otago Regional Council	No	
Southland/Murihiku	Southland Regional Council	No	
Taranaki	Taranaki Regional Council	No	
Tasman/Te Tai-o-Aorere	Tasman District Council	No	
Waikato	Waikato Regional Council	No	
West Coast/Te Tai Poutini	West Coast Regional Council	No	

== Territorial authorities ==
Territorial Authorities That Have Declared a Climate Emergency
Territorial Authorities	Declared a Climate Emergency	Date	Notes
Far North District Council	No		
Whangarei District Council	Yes	25 July 2019	
Kaipara District Council	No		Kaipara has signed a climate change declaration but not a climate emergency declaration
Auckland Council	Yes	11 June 2019	
Thames-Coromandel District Council	No		
Hauraki District Council	No		
Waikato District Council	No		
Matamata-Piako District Council	No		
Hamilton City Council	No		
Waipa District Council	No		
Ōtorohanga District Council	No		
South Waikato District Council	No		
Waitomo District Council	No		
Taupō District Council	No		
Western Bay of Plenty District Council	No		
Tauranga City Council	No		
Rotorua District Council	No		
Whakatāne District Council	No		
Kawerau District Council	No		
Ōpōtiki District Council	Yes	5 September 2019	
Gisborne District Council	No		
Wairoa District Council	No		
Hastings District Council	No		
Napier City Council	No		
Central Hawke's Bay District Council	No		
New Plymouth District Council	No		
Stratford District Council	No		
South Taranaki District Council	No		
Ruapehu District Council	No		
Whanganui District Council	Yes	11 February 2020	
Rangitikei District Council	No		
Manawatu District Council	No		
Palmerston North City Council	No		
Tararua District Council	No		
Horowhenua District Council	No		
Kapiti Coast District Council	Yes	23 May 2019	
Porirua City Council	Yes	26 June 2019	
Upper Hutt City Council	No		
Hutt City Council	Yes	27 June 2019	
Wellington City Council	Yes	21 August 2019	
Masterton District Council	No		
Carterton District Council	No		
South Wairarapa District Council	No		
Tasman District Council	No		
South	No		
Nelson City Council	Yes	16 May 2019	
Marlborough District Council	No		
Buller District Council	No		
Grey District Council	No		
Westland District Council	No		
Kaikōura District Council	No		
Hurunui District Council	No		
Waimakariri District Council	No		
Christchurch City Council	Yes	23 May 2019	
Selwyn District Council	No		
Ashburton District Council	No		
Timaru District Council	No		
Mackenzie District Council	No		
Waimate District Council	No		
Chatham Islands District Council	No		
Waitaki District Council	No		
Central Otago District Council	No		
Queenstown-Lakes District Council	Yes	27 June 2019	
Dunedin City Council	Yes	25 June 2019	
Clutha District Council	No		
Southland District Council	No		
Gore District Council	No		
Invercargill City Council	No		
