= Jacco =

Jacco is a Dutch male given name. It is a form of Jacob or James, only popular since the mid-1960. The spelling Jakko is uncommon. People with the name include:

== Jacco ==
- Jacco Arends (born 1991), Dutch badminton player
- Jacco Eltingh (born 1970), Dutch tennis player
- Jacco Gardner (born 1988), Dutch multi-instrumentalist
- Jacco Verhaeren (born 1969), Dutch swimming coach
- Jacco (singer), real name Jack Mattar, Swedish rapper of the band Labyrint

Animals:

- Jacco Macacco, fighting ape or monkey exhibited in monkey-baiting matches in London in the early 1820s

== Jakko ==
- Jakko (film), a 1941 German drama film directed by Fritz Peter Buch
- Jakko Jakszyk (born 1958), stage name of Michael Lee Curran, English musician
- Jakko Jan Leeuwangh (born 1972), Dutch speed skater

== See also ==
- Jacko (disambiguation)
- Jaco (disambiguation)
- Jaakko Mäntyjärvi (born 1963), Finnish composer
