= Yago (name) =

Name list

- Gender: Male
- Language: Spanish, Portuguese

Other names
- Alternative spelling: Iago
- Related names: Iago, Tiago, Diego, Jaime,

Yago is a name of Spanish origin, first found in Galicia. The given name Yago is a variant of lago, deriving from an old equivalent of Jacob, meaning "supplanter". Variations of the name include Yague, Yagües, Yáguez, Santiago, Santyago, San Diego, and others. Santiago usually refers specifically to the New Testament apostles. Yago is common as a surname in the Philippines.

People with this name include:

== Given name ==
- Yago (footballer, born 1992), Brazilian footballer Yago Fernando da Silva
- Yago (footballer, born 1994), Brazilian footballer Yago Moreira Silva
- Yago (footballer, born 1995), Brazilian footballer Yago Henrique Severino dos Santos
- Yago (footballer, born 1997), Brazilian footballer Yago César da Silva
- Yago Del Piero (born 1994), Brazilian football
- Yago Felipe (born 1994), Brazilian football midfielder
- Yago Fernández (born 1988), Portuguese footballer
- Yago González (born 1979), Spanish footballer
- Yago Iglesias (born 1982), Spanish football manager
- Yago Lamela (1977–2014), Spanish long jumper
- Yago Lange (born 1988), Argentine racing sailor
- Yago Pikachu (born 1992), Brazilian footballer
- Yago Yao (born 1979), Equatoguinean former footballer

== Surname ==
- Bernard Yago (1916–1997), Côte d'Ivoire cardinal and Archbishop of Abidjan
- Gideon Yago (born 1978), writer and former correspondent for MTV News and CBS News
- Steeve Yago (born 1992), French-born Burkinabé footballer who plays as a defender for Toulouse
- Takanori Yago (born 1994), Japanese sumo wrestler

== Fictional characters ==
- Yago, a character from the Summoner video game series

== See also ==
- Iago (disambiguation)
- Jago (name)
