= Jako (disambiguation) =

Jako is a German sportswear company.

Jako may also refer to:

- Jákó, a village in Hungary
- "Jako" (song), 2023 single by Ladaniva
- Jako Island, an island in East Timor
- Jennifer Jako, American activist and filmmaker
- Numata Jakō, 17th-century Japanese woman

== See also ==
- Jaako (disambiguation)
- Jaco (disambiguation)
- Jacko (disambiguation)
