= Yaghoub =

Yaghoub (Persian: يعقوب) is a Persian masculine given name and surname, a form of Jacob. Notable people with the name include:

== Given name ==
- Yaghoub Karimi (born 1991), Iranian footballer
- Yaghoub Sahaf (born 1946), Iranian composer, pianist and musical teacher
- Yaghoub Ali Shourvarzi (1924–1999), Iranian wrestler

== Surname ==
- Muhammad Yaghoub (born 1947), Pakistani wrestler
- Zahra Bani Yaghoub (1980–2007), Iranian medical doctor

== See also ==
- Ezra Yaghoub Synagogue, a synagogue in Tehran, Iran
- Yakub, the Arabic form of Jacob
- Yakup, the Turkish form of Jacob
