= Yashin =

Yashin (Russian: Я́шин) or Yashina (Russian: Я́шина; feminine) is a Russian surname that is derived from Yasha, a diminutive of the male given name Yakov, and literally means Yasha's. It may refer to:

- Alexander Yashin (1913–1968), Russian poet and writer
- Alexei Yashin (born 1973), Russian NHL ice hockey player
- Ilya Yashin (born 1983), Russian politician
- Lev Yashin (1929–1990), Russian football (soccer) goalkeeper
  - Yashin Award, a FIFA award named in his honor
- Yashin (band), Scottish musical group

== See also ==
- Yashino
