= Jago (name) =

Cornish name

Origin
- Origin: Cornish and Welsh
- Meaning: "James", a later form of "Jacob"

Jago is a name first found in Cornwall (part of England, UK), with the variant spellings Jagoe, Jagow, Jeago, Jego, Jeggo, Jaego, Lago, and others. Its origins are debated, but one theory is that it derives from the Welsh lago and Cornish Jago, meaning "James", which is a later version of the name Jacob, meaning "supplanter".

People with the name Jago include:

== Single name ==
- Jago (illustrator) (born 1979), British illustrator
- Jago (sculptor) (born 1987), real name Jacopo Cardillo, Italian sculptor
- Jago of Britain, a legendary king of the Britons

== First name ==
- Jago Cooper (born 1977), British archaeologist
- Jago Eliot (1966–2006), British artist

== Surname ==
- Becky Jago (born 1976), British television presenter
- Charles Jago (born 1943), Canadian historian
- F. V. Jago (1780–1846), English antiquary and oriental traveller, later styled Francis Vyvyan Jago Arundell
- Fred W. P. Jago (fl. 1838–1892), scholar of the Cornish language
- Gordon Jago (1932–2025), English football player and manager
- Harry Jago (1913–1997), Australian politician
- James Jago (1815–1893), British physician
- John Jago (1684 – after 1724), minister at St. John's, Newfoundland, Canada
- Martin Jago (born 1972), British-American poet and stage director
- Nick Jago (born 1977), British musician; drummer of the American rock band Black Rebel Motorcycle Club
- Richard Jago (1715–1781), British poet
- Valentine Jago (1913–1983), Irish politician

== Fictional characters ==
- Henry Gordon Jago, a Doctor Who character
- Jago, a character in C. J. Cherryh's Foreigner series
- Jago (Killer Instinct), a playable character from the video game Killer Instinct

== See also ==
- Iago (disambiguation)
