= Yakiv =

Given name

Yakiv is a Ukrainian masculine given name, cognate to Jacob or James. Notable people with the name include:

- Yakiv Barabash (died 1658), Zaporozhian Cossack Otaman (1657–58) who opposed Hetman Ivan Vyhovsky
- Yakiv Hodorozha (born 1993), Ukrainian former competitive figure skater
- Yakiv Holovatsky (1814–1888), Galician historian, literary scholar, ethnographer, linguist, poet, leader of Galician Russophiles
- Yakiv Hordiyenko (1925–1942), Soviet partisan from Ukraine
- Yakiv Khammo (born 1994), Assyrian-Ukrainian judoka
- Yakiv Kinareykin (born 2003), Ukrainian professional football goalkeeper
- Yakiv Kripak (born 1978), former Ukrainian football midfielder
- Yakiv Kulik (1793–1863), Austrian mathematician known for his construction of a massive factor tables
- Yakiv Lyzohub, military and political figure of the Cossack Hetmanate
- Yakiv Medvetskyi (1880–1941), Greek Catholic hierarch
- Yakiv Punkin (1921–1994), featherweight Greco-Roman wrestler from Ukraine
- Yakiv Smolii (born 1961), Ukrainian economist and banker, former Chairman of the National Bank of Ukraine
- Yakiv Somko (died 1664), Ukrainian Cossack military leader of the Pereyaslav regiment
- Yakiv Stepovy (1883–1921), Ukrainian composer, music teacher, and music critic
- Yakiv Tymchuk, O.S.B.M. (1919–1988), Ukrainian Greek Catholic clandestine hierarch
- Yakiv Yatsynevych (1869–1945), Ukrainian composer, conductor, and folklorist, known for his eclectic works
- Yakiv Zalevskyi (born 1980), Ukrainian professional football coach and former player
- Yakiv Zheleznyak (born 1941), former Soviet sport shooter and Olympic champion

== See also ==
- Yakov
