= Demmy =

Demmy is a given name and surname. Notable people with the name include:

- Demmy Druyts (born 1995), Belgian racing cyclist
- John Demmy (1904–1970), American football player
- Lawrence Demmy (died 2016), British ice dancer
- Demmy Ladipo (born 1991), British actor and writer

== See also ==
- Demme
- Jemmy (disambiguation)
