= Jacko =

Jacko may refer to:

== People ==
=== First name ===
- Jacko Eisenberg (born 1980), Israeli singer
- Jacko McDonagh (born 1962), Irish footballer

=== Nickname ===
- Jacko Barry (born 1975), Irish darts player
- Jacko Fossett (1922–2004), English clown
- Jacko Gill (born 1994), New Zealand shot putter
- Jacko Heaslip (1899–1966), Irish cricketer
- Mark Jackson (Australian footballer) (born 1959), Australian rules footballer
- Michael Jackson (1958–2009), American entertainer nicknamed "Wacko Jacko"
- Hidalgo Moya (1920–1994), American architect
- Jacko Page (born 1959), British Army general

=== Surname ===
- Edward W. Jacko (1916–1979) American civil rights attorney
- Patrik Jacko (born 1992), Slovak footballer, cousin of Mário Jacko

=== Ring name ===
- Ali Jacko, ring name of English kickboxer Abdul Ali (born 1969)

== Other uses ==
- Jacko, claimed world record-holding rat-baiting terrier
- The Jacko or The Dartmouth Jack-O-Lantern, American college humor magazine
- Jacko, 1993 novel by Thomas Keneally

== See also ==
- Jacko Hoax, an 1884 cryptid hoax reported in British Columbia
- Jack-O, a 1995 American horror film
- Džeko (surname)
- Jaco (disambiguation)
- Jako (disambiguation)
- Jakko
