= Chacko =

Chacko (Malayalam: ചാക്കോ) is a Syriac Malayalam masculine given name and surname, a form of Jacob and James. It is most commonly found among Syrian Christians in Kerala and Cochin Jews. Notable people with the name include:

== Given name ==
- Chemmanam Chacko (1926–2018), Indian poet
- I. C. Chacko (1875–1966), Indian geologist, philologist, writer and grammarian
- Jose Chacko Periappuram (born 1958), Indian cardiac surgeon and medical writer
- K. T. Chacko (born 1947), Indian government official
- Mathai Chacko (1959–2006), Indian politician
- M. Mani Chacko (born 1955), Indian Old Testament scholar and management consultant
- P. Chacko (died 1978), Indian politician
- P. C. Chacko (born 1946), Indian politician
- P. T. Chacko (1915–1964), Indian politician
- Chacko Vadaketh (born 1963), Indian-born Malaysian actor, emcee and television host

== Surname ==
- Ben Chacko (born 1984), English journalist
- Dorothy Chacko (1904–1992), American social worker, humanitarian and medical doctor
- Mijo Chacko Kurian (born 1995), Indian track and field athlete
- Molly Chacko (born 1969), Indian middle distance runner
- Rosamma Chacko (1927–2019), Indian politician
- Shine Tom Chacko (born 1983), Indian actor and assistant director

== See also ==
- Chacko Randaaman, a 2006 Indian action film
