= Jaska =

Jaska may also refer to:

- Jaska, Estonia, a village near Viljandi
- Jaska, Croatia, alternate name of Jastrebarsko, a town near Zagreb
- Jaska Raatikainen (born 1979), Finnish drummer
- Jaska Saarivuori, Finnish artistic gymnast
- Rudolf Jaska, Estonian lawyer and politician
- Jaakko Saariluoma, Finnish actor, writer, director, and television presenter, known as "Jaska"

== See also ==
- Jaksa (disambiguation)
- Yāska, ancient Indian grammarian and Vedic linguist
