= Yakov =

Yakov (alternative spellings: Jakov or Iakov, Cyrillic: Яков) is a Russian or Hebrew variant of the given names Jacob and James. People also give the nickname Yasha (Cyrillic: Яша) or Yashka (Cyrillic: Яшка) used for Yakov.

== Notable people ==
People named Yakov

- Yakov Blumkin (1900–1929), a Left Socialist-Revolutionary
- Yakov Cherevichenko (1894–1976), Soviet military leader
- Yakov Chubin (1893–1956), Soviet official
- Yakov Dzhugashvili (1907–1943), the oldest son of Joseph Stalin
- Yakov Eliashberg (born 1946), American mathematician
- Yakov Ehrlich (born 1988), former Russian football player
- Yakov Eshpay (1890–1963), Soviet composer
- Yakov Estrin (1923–1987), Soviet chess player
- Yakov Fedorenko (1896–1947), Soviet military leader
- Yakov Frenkel (1894–1952), Soviet physicist
- Yakov Fliyer (1912–1977), Soviet pianist
- Yakov Gakkel (1901–1965), Soviet oceanographer
- Yakov "Yan" Gamarnik (1894–1937), Soviet official
- Yakov Grot (1812–1893), Russian philologist
- Yakov Kazyansky (born 1948), Russian musician
- Yakov Knyazhnin (1740/42–1791), Russian playwright
- Yakov Kozalchik (1902–1953), Polish strongman and professional wrestler who was also known as Shimshon Eisen
- Yakov Kreizberg (1959–2011), American conductor
- Yakov Kreizer (1905–1969), Soviet military leader
- Yakov Kulnev (1763–1812), Russian military leader
- Yakov Malik (1906–1980), Soviet diplomat
- Yakov Malkiel (1914–1998), American philologist
- Yakov I. Perelman (1882–1942), Soviet writer
- Yakov Permyakov (?–1712), Russian polar explorer
- Yakov Peters (1886–1938), Soviet official
- Yakov Polonsky (1819–1898), Russian poet
- Yakov Popok (1892–1938), Soviet official
- Yakov Protazanov (1881–1945), Russian and Soviet filmmaker
- Yakov Punkin (1921–1994), Soviet Olympic Greco-Roman featherweight wrestling champion
- Yakov Rylsky (1928–1999), Soviet Olympic and world champion saber fencer
- Yakov Sannikov, Russian merchant and explorer
- Yakov Shakhovskoy (1705–1777), Russian statesman
- Yakov G. Sinai (born 1935), Russian–American mathematician
- Yakov Smirnoff (born 1951), Ukrainian-born American comedian, painter and teacher
- Yakov Springer (1921–1972), Polish-Israeli athlete
- Yakov Sverdlov (1885–1919), Bolshevik party leader and official of the Russian Soviet Republic
- Yakov Tolstikov (born 1959), Russian distance runner
- Yakov-Yan Toumarkin (born 1992), Israeli swimmer
- Yakov Vilner (1899–1931), Ukrainian chess master
- Yakov Yurovsky (1878–1938), Old Bolshevik activist
- Yakov Zak (1913–1976), Soviet pianist and teacher
- Yakov Borisovich Zel'dovich (1914–1987), Soviet physicist

== See also ==
- Jakov
- Yakiv
- Yakovlev (surname)
- Yakovenko
