= Pullinen =

Pullinen is a Finnish surname. Notable people with the surname include:

- Erkki Pullinen (1871–1934), Finnish farmer and politician
- Laila Pullinen (1933–2015), Finnish artist and sculptor

== See also ==
- Pellinen
