= Yago =

Yago or YAGO may refer to:

- Yagō, a term applied in traditional Japanese culture to names passed down within a guild, studio, or other circumstance other than blood relations
- YAGO (database), a semantic knowledge base
- Yago (name), includes list of people and characters with the name
- Yago (telenovela), a Mexican telenovela from Televisa

== See also ==
- Iago (disambiguation)
- Jago (disambiguation)
