= Jakov =

Jakov (Serbian Cyrillic: Јаков, pronounced [jâkoʋ]) is a masculine given name of Biblical origin and a saints' name. It is cognate to Jakob, Yakov, Jacob and James. It is often found in Croatia and Serbia, and also appears elsewhere.

The name Jacob is of Hebrew origin and means "God protects" and is also a Latin derivative of the original Hebrew name Jakow, which comes from the word Akev and literally translates as "heel".

According to the 2021 population census, 11,555 people with the name Jakov live in Croatia.

The nicknames derived from this name include Jakša, Jakica, Jako and Jaki.

Notable people with the name include:

- Jakov (bishop), Serbian medieval archbishop
- Jakov Bienenfeld, Croatian entrepreneur and developer
- Jakov Brdar, Slovenian-Bosnian sculptor
- Jakov Cindro, Croatian politician
- Jakov Fak, Croatian-Slovenian biathlete
- Jakov Filipović, Croatian football player
- Jakov Geller, Russian chess player (cf. list of chess grandmasters)
- Jakov Gojun, Croatian handball player
- Jakov Gotovac, Croatian composer and conductor
- Jakov Grcić, Croatian futsal player
- Jakov Ignjatović, Serbian-Hungarian novelist and prose writer
- Jakov Lind, Austrian-British writer
- Jakov Mikalja, Italian linguist and lexicographer of Slavic ancestry
- Jakov Nenadović, Serbian military commander and politician
- Jakov Sedlar, Croatian film director and producer
- Jakov Surać, Croatian football player
- Jakov Vladović, Croatian basketball player
- Jakov Vranković, Croatian handball player
- Jakov Xoxa, Albanian writer
- Ivan Jakov Džoni, Croatian football player

== See also ==
- Jakovljević
- Jakov Polje
