= Giacobbo =

Giacobbo is a surname of Jewish origin. Notable with this surname include:

- Massimiliano Giacobbo (born 1974), retired Italian professional football midfielder
- Roberto Giacobbo (born 1961), Italian journalist, author, television presenter and television writer
- Viktor Giacobbo (born 1952), Swiss writer, comedian and actor

== See also ==
- Giacobbe
