= Jacobo =

Jacobo is both a surname and a given name of Spanish origin. Based on the name Jacob. Notable people with the name include:

== Given name ==
- Jacobo Majluta Azar (1934 – 1996), politician from Dominican Republic, was president for 43 days in 1982
- Jacobo Arenas (1924–1990), Colombian guerrilla and ideological leader of FARC
- Dan Jacobo Beninson (1931–2003), Argentine radiation expert
- Jacobo Bolbochán (1906–1984), Argentine chess master
- Jacobo Borges (born 1931), contemporary, neo-figurative Latin-American artist
- Jacobo Díaz (born 1976), former professional male tennis player from Spain
- Juan Jacobo Fernandez (1808–1860), Franciscan friar, a martyr who achieved beatification
- Jacobo Fijman (1898–1970), Argentine poet born in Bessarabia, now mainly in Moldova
- Jacobo Fitz-James Stuart, 17th Duke of Alba (1878–1953), Spanish noble, diplomat, politician and art collector
- Jacobo Fitz-James Stuart, 5th Duke of Liria and Jérica (1773–1794), Spanish nobleman
- Jacobo Fitz-James Stuart, 6th Duke of Liria and Jérica (1792–1795), the second surviving son of the 5th Duke of Berwick
- Jacobo Árbenz Guzmán (1913–1971), Guatemalan military officer and politician
- Jacobo Mansilla (born 1987), Argentine football midfielder
- Jacobo Morales (born 1934), Puerto Rican actor, writer and film director
- Jacobo Sanz Ovejero (born 1983), Spanish football goalkeeper
- Jacobo Pacchiarotto, 16th-century Italian painter of the Renaissance period
- Jacobo Palm (1887–1982), Curaçao-born composer
- Jacobo Rispa, director and freelance producer working mainly in TV drama & film
- Jacobo Timerman (1923–1999), publisher, journalist, and author
- Jacobo Kyushei Tomonaga (1582–1633), Japanese Roman Catholic priest and martyr
- Jacobo Arbenz Villanova (born 1946), politician in Guatemala
- Jacobo Ynclán (born 1984), Spanish football midfielder
- Jacobo Zabludovsky (born 1928), Mexican journalist

== Surname ==
- Alfredo Jacobo (born 1982), Olympic breaststroke swimmer from Mexico
- Cesar Chavez Jacobo, Dominican professional basketball player
- Clara Jacobo, Italian opera singer
- Jordan Jacobo, American actor, writer and director

=== Fictional characters ===
- Jonathan Jacobo, a fictional character from Scooby-Doo 2: Monsters Unleashed

== See also ==
- Jacobo Hunter District, one of the twenty-nine districts of the Arequipa Province in Peru
- Jacobo Ortis, 1916 Italian silent drama film based on the novel Le ultime lettere di Jacopo Ortis by Ugo Foscolo
- Que No Te Haga Bobo Jacobo, song by the Mexican rock band Molotov from their début album Dónde Jugarán las Niñas
