= Jeppe (name) =

- Gender: Male
- Language: Danish

Origin
- Region of origin: Denmark

Other names
- Derived: From the Hebrew יַעֲקֹב (Ya‘aqōv)
- Related names: Jakob, Ib

Jeppe is a predominantly Danish masculine given name and surname. Notable people with the name include:

Given name

- Jeppe Aakjær (1866–1930), Danish poet and novelist
- Jeppe Andersen (born 1992), Danish footballer
- Jeppe Bay (born 1997), Danish badminton player
- Jeppe Brandrup (born 1985), Danish footballer
- Jeppe Brinch (born 1995), Danish footballer
- Jeppe Bruus Christensen (born 1978), Danish politician
- Jeppe Corfitzen (born 2004), Danish footballer
- Jeppe Curth (born 1984), Danish footballer
- Jeppe Erenbjerg (born 2000), Danish footballer
- Jeppe Gertsen (born 1997), Danish footballer
- Jeppe Grønning (born 1991), Danish footballer
- Jeppe Gjervig Gram (born 1976), Danish screenwriter
- Jeppe Hansen (born 1989), Danish footballer
- Jeppe Hasseriis (a.k.a. Dynatron; born 1980), Danish music producer
- Jeppe Hein (born 1974), Danish artist
- Jeppe Højbjerg (born 1995), Danish footballer
- Jeppe Huldahl (born 1982), Danish golfer
- Jeppe Illum (born 1992), Danish footballer
- Jeppe Jensen Kollat (born 1972), Danish lightweight rower
- Jeppe Johnsson (born 1951), Swedish politician
- Jeppe Kronback (a.k.a. URO; born 1997), Danish singer and songwriter
- Jeppe Kjær (born 1985), Danish footballer
- Jeppe Kjær (born 1994), Danish footballer
- Jeppe Kofod (born 1974), Danish politician
- Jeppe Beck Laursen (born 1972), Norwegian actor
- Jeppe Laursen (born 1977), Danish singer-songwriter and music producer
- Jeppe Ludvigsen (born 1989), Danish badminton player
- Jeppe Mehl (born 1986), Danish footballer
- Jeppe Moe (born 1995), Norwegian footballer
- Jeppe Nielsen (born 1974), Danish freestyle swimmer
- Jeppe Normann (born 1951), Norwegian fencer
- Jeppe Okkels (born 1999), Danish footballer
- Jeppe Pedersen (born 2001), Danish footballer
- Jeppe Prætorius (1745–1823), Danish merchant and shipowner
- Jeppe Riber (born 1985), Danish handballer
- Jeppe Riddervold (born 1976), Danish songwriter, entrepreneur, and music publisher
- Jeppe Rønde (born 1973), Danish filmmaker
- Jeppe Simonsen (born 1995), Danish footballer
- Jeppe Søe (born 1971), Danish politician and journalist
- Jeppe Strokirk (1789–1856), Swedish ironmaster
- Jeppe Svenningsen (born 1994), Danish footballer
- Jeppe Tengbjerg (born 1973), Danish footballer and manager
- Jeppe Tranholm-Mikkelsen (born 1962), Danish diplomat
- Jeppe Tverskov (born 1993), Danish footballer
- Jeppe Vestergaard (born 1972), Danish footballer
- Jeppe Bruun Wahlstrøm (a.k.a. Yepha; born 1983), Danish, singer, rapper and hip hop artist
- Jeppe Wikström (born 1963), Swedish book publisher and photographer

Surname

- Barbara Jeppe (1921–1999), South African botanical artist
- Friederich Jeppe (1834–1898), German postmaster general
- Harold Jeppe (1899–1975), South African hurdler
- Karen Jeppe (1876–1935), Danish missionary and social worker
