= Jaakson =

Origin
- Meaning: "son of Jaak"
- Region of origin: Estonia

Other names
- Variant form: Jackson

Jaakson is an Estonian patronymic surname meaning "son of Jaak". Notable people with the surname include:

- Aleksander Jaakson (1892–1942), Estonian military commander
- Arvo Jaakson (1942–2019), Estonian politician
- Ernst Jaakson (1905–1998), Estonian diplomat
- Jüri Jaakson (1870–1942), Estonian businessman and politician
