= Jokūbas =

- Gender: Male
- Name day: 25 July

Origin
- Region of origin: Lithuania

Other names
- Related names: Jacob, Jakob, James

Jokūbas is a Lithuanian masculine given name. It is a cognate of the given names Jacob and James and may refer to:

- Edvardas Jokūbas Daukša (1836–1890), Lithuanian poet, translator, participant of 1863 Uprising
- Jokūbas Gintvainis (born 1994), Lithuanian basketball player
- Jokūbas Minkevičius (1921–1996), Lithuanian politician
- Jokūbas Šernas (1888–1926), Lithuanian attorney, journalist, teacher, and banker
- Jokūbas Smuškevičius (1902–1941), Soviet-Lithuanian Commander of the Soviet Air Force
- Jokūbas Vygodskis (aka, Jakub Wygodzki) (1856–1941), Polish–Lithuanian Jewish politician, Zionist activist, and a medical doctor
