= Jakob (given name) =

- Pronunciation: /ˈdʒeɪkəb/
- Gender: Male

Origin
- Meaning: "He may/will/shall follow/heed/seize-by-the-heel/watch/guard/protect”, "Supplanter/Assailant", "May God protect" or "May he protect"

Other names
- Short forms: Jack, Jake, Jay, Jakey, Coby, Jem
- Related names: James, Jacob, Jakob, Jakov, Jakub, Jakeb, Ya'koub, Yakub, Yakup, Ya'qoub

Jakob is a masculine given name that is a variant spelling of the Hebrew given name Jacob.

- Jakob Ammann (1644–1712–1730), Anabaptist leader and namesake of the Amish religious movement
- Jakob Chychrun (born 1998), Canadian-American ice hockey player
- Jakob Dusek (born 1996), Austrian snowboarder
- Jakob Dylan (born 1969), American singer and songwriter
- Jakob Edsen (born 1993), Danish orienteering competitor
- Jakob Finci (born 1943), Bosnian lawyer and president of the Inter-Religious Council of Bosnia and Herzegovina
- Jakob Fugger of the Lily (1459–1525), also known as Jakob Fugger the Rich
- Jakob "Jake" Gelof (born 2002), American baseball third baseman
- Jakob Kasimir Hellrigl (born 1992), known as Candy Ken, Austrian rapper and model
- Jakob Ingebrigtsen (born 2000), Norwegian middle- and long-distance runner
- Jakob Johnson (born 1994), American football player
- Jakob Junis (born 1992), American baseball pitcher for the San Francisco Giants
- Jakob Myklebust, Norwegian musician formerly known as Jakob Ogawa
- Jacob Lissek (born 1992), American soccer player
- Jakob Mandlbauer (born 1988), Austrian bobsledder
- Jakob Marsee (born 2001), American baseball player
- Jakob Oftebro (born 1986), Norwegian actor
- Jakob Olofsgård (born 1975), Swedish politician
- Jakob Poulsen (born 1983), Danish football player
- Jakob Pöltl (born 1995), Austrian basketball player
- Jakob Ragnarsson (born 1999), American-born Swedish ice hockey player
- Jakob Reinhard (1742–1787), German robber, also known as Hannikel
- Jakob Robinson (born 2000), American football player
- Jakob Silfverberg (born 1990), Swedish ice hockey player
- Jakob Sølvhøj (born 1954), Danish politician
- Jakob Sporrenberg (1902–1952), German Nazi SS officer executed for war crimes
- Jakob Stausholm, Danish businessman
- Jakob Tanner (1946–2020), Swiss wrestler
- Jakob Weiseborn (1892–1939), German Nazi SS Flossenbürg concentration camp commandant
- Jakob Zimmer (born 1999), German politician

== See also ==
- Jacob (name)
- Yacob, which includes a list of people with the given name Yacob, Yakob or Yaqob
