= Jaako =

Jaako may refer to:

- Jaako people, an ethnic group of Australia
- Jaako language, an Australian language
- Joni Jaako, Swedish athlete

== See also ==
- Jaakko, a Finnish given name (including a list of people with the name)
- Jako (disambiguation)
