= Santiago (name) =

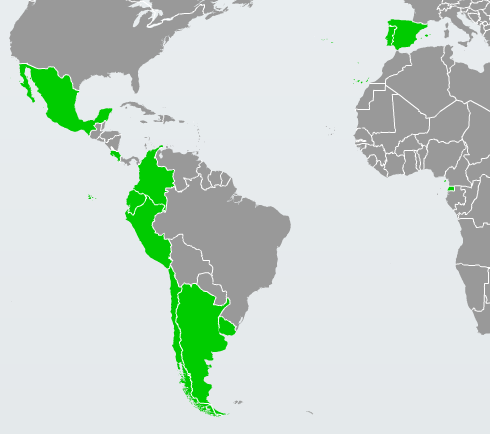

Santiago is a masculine Spanish name that derives from the Hebrew name Jacob (Ya'akov) via "Sant Iago", "Sant Yago", "Santo Iago", or "Santo Yago", first used to denote Saint James the Great, the brother of John the Apostle. It is traditionally believed that Saint James (Santiago) had travelled to the Iberian Peninsula during his life and was buried there. The name is complicated in Spanish in that Jaime and Jacobo are modern versions of James.

Variants of Santiago include Iago (a common Galician language name), and Thiago or Tiago (a common Portuguese language name). The common name James has many forms in Iberia, including Xacobo or Xacobe and Iago (in Galician), Jaume, Xaume (in Catalan), Jaime, Jacobo, and Diego (in Spanish) and Jacó or Jacob, Jaime and Diogo (in Portuguese). San Diego does not refer to Saint James but to Saint Didacus of Alcalá, although the name Diego has now been associated with James via folk etymology for over two centuries.

"Santi", "San", "Tiago", or "Thiago" are the nicknames for Santiago, although "Sandy" is sometimes used in English-speaking countries.

== People named Santiago ==
- Santiago, a Quechan or Yuma chief in the early 1850s
- Santiago Abascal, Spanish politician, president of the Vox party
- Santiago Amador, Colombian road cyclist
- Santiago Amodeo, film director and screenwriter
- Santiago Bernabéu, former Real Madrid president
  - Santiago Bernabéu Stadium, the stadium of Real Madrid, named after Santiago Bernabéu Yeste
- Santiago Botero, Colombian cyclist
- Santiago Bueno, Uruguayan footballer
- Santiago Cabrera, Chilean actor
- Santiago Calatrava, Spanish architect
- Santiago Cañizares, Spanish footballer
- Santiago Carrillo (1915–2012), Spanish politician
- Santi Cazorla, Spanish footballer
- Santiago Espinal (born 1994), Dominican Republic professional baseball player
- Santiago Fernández (footballer, born 1985), a Mexican football player
- Santiago Fernández (footballer, born 1991), an Uruguayan football player
- Santi Freixa, Spanish field hockey player
- Santiago Giménez, Argentine-born Mexican Footballer
- Santiago Iglesias, congressman from Puerto Rico
- Santiago de Liniers, French-born defender of Buenos Aires in 1806–1807 and later viceroy
- Santiago Lopo (born 1974), Galician writer, teacher and translator
- Santiago Lorenzo, Argentine decathlete
- Santiago Martín Sánchez (born 1938), known as "El Viti", Spanish bullfighter
- Santiago de Murcia, Spanish baroque guitarist and composer
- Santiago Nsobeya, Equatoguinean politician
- Santiago Otheguy (born 1973), Argentine film director
- Santiago Torres, Argentine fencer
- Santiago Palavecino, Argentine boxer
- Santiago de la Parte, Spanish long-distance runner
- Santiago Phelan, Argentine rugby player and coach
- Santiago Ramón y Cajal, Spanish neuroscientist, histologist and physician
- Santiago Ramos (born 2004), Mexican racing driver
- Santiago Rodriguez, pianist and professor from Cuba
- Santiago Schnell, Venezuelan scientist
- Santiago Solari, Argentine footballer
- Santiago de León de Caracas
- Santiago Véscovi (born 2001), Uruguayan basketball player

== Fictional characters ==
- Santiago (The Vampire Chronicles), a character in Anne Rice's 1976 novel Interview with the Vampire
- Santiago, a character in the 2024 American superhero film Madame Web
- Santiago, main character in Paulo Coelho's novel The Alchemist
- Santiago, main character in Ernest Hemingway's novel The Old Man and the Sea
- Santiago, main antagonist in Volver a Empezar, a 1994 Mexican telenovela
- Santiago, in Santiago: a Myth of the Far Future
- Santiago, in the American television series Friday Night Lights
- Santiago, in Las ataduras by Carmen Martín Gaite
- Don Santiago "Capitan Tiago" de los Santos, a character in Jose Rizal's novel Noli Me Tángere.
- Santiago Arnavisca, a character from the video game series Rainbow Six
- Santiago Muñez, Mexican character in the Goal movie series
- Santiago Nasar, protagonist of Gabriel García Márquez's novel Chronicle of a Death Foretold
- Santiago “Jimmy” Robertson, an LAPD Newton Division Detective III and former colleague of the titular character in the television show Bosch.
- Santiago Rivera, a character from the educational computer game series The ClueFinders
- Santiago Zavala, a character from Conversation in The Cathedral
- Santiago "Tiago" Vega, main character Penny Dreadful: City of Angels, 2020 television series
- Amy Santiago, in the American television series Brooklyn Nine-Nine
- Hale Santiago, in the Canadian television series Lost Girl
- Colonel Corazon Santiago, in the PC strategy game Sid Meier's Alpha Centauri
- Dominic Santago in the shooting game franchise Gears of War

== See also ==
- Santiago (surname)
- San Diego
- Saint James (disambiguation)
- Yago (name)
