= Jaagup =

Male given name

- Gender: Male
- Language: Estonian
- Name day: 25 July (Estonia)

Origin
- Region of origin: Estonia

Other names
- Related names: Jaak, Jakob, Jaakob

Jaagup is an Estonian masculine given name, variant of Jacob and James.

People named Jaagup include:

- Jaagup Leeman (1893–1986), military commander
- Jaagup Linnakivi (1900–1965), architect
- Jaagup Loosalu (1898–1996), publisher, journalist, agricultural scientist and politician
- Jaagup Kreem (born 1973), musician (Terminaator)
