= Lopo =

Lopo may refer to:

== People ==
=== Surname ===
- Alberto Lopo (born 1980), Spanish football player
- Fausto Lopo de Carvalho, Portuguese pulmonologist
- Santiago Lopo (born 1974), Galician author

=== Given name ===
- Lopo Fernandes Pacheco (died 1349)
- Lopo Gomes de Abreu (1420–70s?), Portuguese nobleman
- Lopo Homem (16th century), Portuguese cartographer and cosmographer
- Lopo Soares de Albergaria
- Lopo Vaz de Sampaio
- Lopo de Almeida (1416–1486)
- Lopo de Alpoim (1400-?), Portuguese nobleman
- Lopo de Brito
- Lopo do Nascimento (born 1942), Angolan politician

== Other ==
- Lopo house
- LOPO, meaning low power, the first aqueous homogeneous reactor
