= Yashino =

Yashino may refer to:

- Yashino, Ivanovo Oblast, a village in Ivanovo Oblast, Russia
- Yashino, Leningrad Oblast, a settlement in Leningrad Oblast, Russia
- Yashino, name of several other rural localities in Russia
