= Jakša =

Jakša is a South Slavic masculine given name and a surname.

The name is a hypocorism of the name Jakov.

Notable people with the name include:

- Jakša Brežičić (fl. 1450s), Serbian duke
- Jakša Cvitanić (born 1962), Croatian-American mathematician
- Jakša Račić (1868–1943), Croatian and Yugoslav politician
- Jakša Fiamengo (1946–2018), Croatian writer
- Bogomir Jakša (1936–2015), Slovenian painter and teacher

== See also ==
- Jaksa
