= Iago (disambiguation) =

Iago is the main antagonist in the play Othello by William Shakespeare

Iago may also refer to:

== Biology ==
- Iago (shark), a genus of hound sharks
- Iago sparrow, endemic to the Cape Verde archipelago

== Characters ==
- Iago (Aladdin), a parrot in the 1992 film Aladdin and various Disney media
- Iago, a character in the American television series Gargoyles

== People ==
=== Footballers ===
- Iago (footballer, born 1995) or Iago Sampaio Silva, Brazilian footballer
- Iago (footballer, born 1997) or Iago Amaral Borduchi, Brazilian footballer
- Iago (footballer, born 1999) or Iago Fabrício Gonçalves dos Reis, a Brazilian footballer
- Iago Falque (born 1990), a Spanish footballer who plays as an attacking midfielder
- Iago Aspas (born 1987), a Spanish professional footballer who plays as a striker.
- Iago Iglesias (born 1984), a Spanish professional footballer

=== Other people ===
- Iago, a variant form of the name Jago
- Iago, a variant form of the name Jacob
- Iago, a pen-name of Sir Robert Walpole
- Iago ap Beli (c. 560–c. 616), king of Gwynedd
- Iago ap Idwal (ruled 950–979), king of Gwynedd

== Place ==
- Iago, Texas, United States
- Santiago, Cape Verde, an island also called "St. Iago" or "St. Jago"

== Other ==
- Iago (film), a 2009 Italian film
- IAGO, the International Abstract Games Organization
- Iago, a GWR Banking Class steam locomotive on the Great Western Railway
- Porth Iago, the site of the ancient St Medin's Church near Aberdaron, Gwynedd, Wales
- A Spanish and Welsh variant of the name Jacob

== See also ==
- Jago (disambiguation)
- Yago (disambiguation)
