= Jimy =

Jimy is a given name. It may refer to:

- Jimy Chambers, American drummer, member of Mercury Rev
- Jimy Heredia (born 1996), Peruvian volleyball player
- Jimy Hettes (born 1987), American mixed martial artist
- Jimy Raw (1961–2020), Brazilian radio host, television presenter and singer
- Jimy Szymanski (born 1975), Venezuelan tennis player
- Jimy Williams (1943–2024), American baseball player, coach and manager

== See also ==
- Jimi (disambiguation)
- Jimmy (given name)
