= Jago =

Jago may refer to:

== Geography ==
- Jago, a port and town on the Indonesian island of Singkep, Riau Islands Province
- Jago, County Kildare, a former civil parish in County Kildare, Ireland
- Jago Bay, Northwest Territories, Canada
- Jago River, a river in Alaska
- Santiago, Cape Verde, an island also called "St. Iago" or "St. Jago"

== People ==
- Jago, an alternative spelling for Iago
- Jago (name), includes list of people and fictional characters with this name

== Other uses ==
- Jago, a 1991 novel by Kim Newman
- Jago or preman, a type of strongman (often romanticized) in the social and political history of Indonesia
- Jago (car), a British kit-car maker
- JAGO (German research submersible), a crewed research submersible
- Jago Temple, a Hindu temple in Tumpang, Malang Regency, East Java, Indonesia

== See also ==
- A Child of the Jago, an 1896 novel by Arthur Morrison
