= Jakovljević =

Jakovljević (Serbian: Јаковљевић) is a south slav patronymic surname derived from a masculine given name Jakov. Notable people with the surname include:

- Samuilo Jakovljević (1760–1825), Orthodox clergyman and Serbian diplomatic envoy
- Stevan Jakovljević (1890–1962), Serbian author, biologist and professor
- Anto Jakovljević (1962–2025), Bosnian Croat football goalkeeper
- Dragan Jakovljević (born 1962), Bosnian Serb footballer
- Ivan Jakovljević (born 1989), Serbian footballer
- Robi Jakovljević (born 1993), Slovenian footballer
- Slobodan Jakovljević (born 1989), Serbian footballer
- Zvonko Jakovljević (born 1996), Serbian footballer
- Ana Jakovljević (born 1981), Serbian politician
