= Pellinen =

Pellinen is a Finnish surname. Notable people with the surname include:

- Eila Pellinen (1938–1977), Finnish singer
- Jyrki Pellinen (born 1940), Finnish writer, poet and visual artist
- Jouni Pellinen (born 1983), Finnish freestyle skier
- Jaakko Pellinen (born 1988), Finnish professional ice hockey forward
- Aku Pellinen (born 1993), Finnish racing driver
