= Jaakko =

Jaakko (Finnish: [ˈjɑːkːo]) is a Finnish male first name, etymologically rooted in the Biblical names Jacob or James. The name day of Jaakko in the Finnish calendar is July 25. Jaakko may refer to:

- Kings who are in English named James are in Finnish named Jaakko
- Jakob De la Gardie in Finnish "Laiska-Jaakko" ("Jakob the lazy"), a Swedish count; nowadays laiskajaakko is the synonym for a lazy person
- Jaakko Blomberg (born 1942), Finnish diplomat
- Jaakko Forsman (1839–1899), Finnish jurist and politician, leading activist of the Fennoman movement
- Jaakko Hallama (1917–1996), Finnish former Foreign Ministry official
- Jaakko Hintikka, Finnish philosopher
- Jaakko Hämeen-Anttila, Finnish professor in Arabian language and Islam
- Jaakko Ihamuotila (1939–2023), Finnish business executive
- Jaakko Ilkka, Finnish rebel
- Jaakko Itälä, Finnish politician
- Jaakko Jonkka (1953–2022), Chancellor of Justice of Finland (from July 2007)
- Jaakko Kalela (born 1944), Finnish civil servant and diplomat
- Jaakko Kolmonen (1941–2016), Finnish chef
- Jaakko Kuusisto (1974—2022), Finnish violinist, conductor and composer
- Jaakko Laajava (born 1947), Finnish Under-Secretary of State for Foreign and Security Policy
- Jaakko Laakso, Finnish politician
- Jaakko Lepola (born 1990), Finnish football player
- Jaakko Löytty, Finnish gospel musician
- Jaakko Mäki (1878–1938), Finnish politician
- Jaakko Mäntyjärvi (born 1963), Finnish composer of classical music, professional translator
- Jaakko Mattila (born 1976), Finnish painter
- Jaakko Nyberg (born 1980), Finnish football defender
- Jaakko Ohtonen (born 1989), Finnish actor
- Jaakko Ojaniemi, Finnish sportsman
- Jaakko Paavolainen (1927–2007), Finnish historian
- Jaakko Pakkasvirta, Finnish actor
- Jaakko Pellinen, Finnish professional ice hockey forward
- Jaakko Pöyry, Finnish industrialist
- Jaakko Rissanen, Finnish professional ice hockey player
- Jaakko Ryhänen (born 1946), Finnish opera singer
- Jaakko Salovaara, Finnish musician
- Jaakko Syrjä, (1926–2022), Finnish writer
- Jaakko Tallus (born 1981), Nordic combined athlete from Finland and Olympic gold medallist
- Jaakko Tähtinen, Finnish architect
- Jaakko Turtiainen, Finnish professional ice hockey forward
- Jaakko Valtanen (1925–2024), Finnish general
- Jaakko Vuorinen (1923–1982), Finnish Olympic fencer
- Jaakko Wallenius (1958–2013), Finnish writer and journalist

== See also ==
- Jaakko Ilkka (opera), opera by Finnish composer Jorma Panula
- Sarvijaakko, timberman beetle.
