= Hākopa =

Hākopa or Hakopa is a given name. It is a Māori transliteration of the name Jacob. Notable people with the name include:

- Hākopa Hēperi (1849–1906), New Zealand carver
- Hakopa Kuka-Larsen, New Zealand musician
