= Jákup =

- Gender: Male
- Language: Faroese

Origin
- Region of origin: Faroe Islands

Jákup is a Faroese masculine given name, a cognate of the names Jacob and James. People with the name Jákup include:

- Jákup á Borg (born 1979), Faroese footballer
- Jákup Dahl (1878-1944), Faroese Provost and Bible translator
- Jákup Pauli Gregoriussen (born 1932), Faroese architect
- Jákup Jakobsen, (1864-1918), Faroese linguist and literary scholar
- Jákup Jógvansson (16??-16??), Prime Minister of the Faroe Islands from 1677 to 1679
- Jákup Mikkelsen (born 1970), Faroese footballer
