= Jimy Raw =

Brazilian radio host, television presenter, and singer (1961–2020)

Germano Raw Neto, better known as Jimy Raw or Jimmy Raw (Niterói, 4 July 1961 — Rio de Janeiro, 2 June 2020) was a Brazilian radio host, television presenter and singer.

== Biography and career ==
Raw started his career at a very young age, as one of the producers of the program 'Aqui e Agora' on the now defunct TV Tupi. In the world of radio, where he was widely respected and considered a reference in the "carioca voice", he started at Rádio Capital, but as a commercial contact.

He moved to the state of Paraná in 1982, at the invitation of journalist Ari Soares, to join the team of producers and presenters of the program 'Na Boca do Povo' in the afternoons of TV OM, then an affiliate of Bandeirantes, current CNT. It was in Curitiba that he started his successful radio career, standing out as a host at FM 104 (current Jovem Pan FM Curitiba).

He returned to Rio de Janeiro, where he became famous for his programs on the following radio stations: Antena1 FM and 98 FM (today Rádio Globo), the latter belonging to the Globo Radio System.

He worked in São Paulo for a short time in the early 1990s at X FM (now CBN São Paulo), where he presented the program "Show da X".

Raw also presented programs on TV, having worked in Rede Manchete in the programs 'Bike Show' and 'Shock', with several participations in television events and in the carnival. Afterwards, he achieved consecration in the presentation of Globo de Ouro, in Rede Globo, from September 1989 to December 1989, with the actress Isabela Garcia. He returned to present the last program, on December 28, 1990, together with the actress Adriana Esteves.

In 1992 he started his singing career, recording the LP "Tudo Bem".

Between 2006 and 2016 he worked at Super Rádio Tupi in Rio de Janeiro, of the Grupo Diários Associados, presenting 'Baú da Tupi' on Sundays from 00:00 to 03:00.

After leaving Rádio Tupi, he participated in the YouTube channel "A Turma do Rádio", along with other radio broadcasters without space on commercial radio stations.

His partner was Luciana Sargentelli, daughter of the samba dancer and presenter of the 'mulatas show' Oswaldo Sargentelli.

Since April 19, 2020, Raw began to experience symptoms of COVID-19 during the pandemic in Brazil, and on May 7 he was admitted to the ICU at the Municipal Hospital Ronaldo Gazolla, in the North Zone of Rio de Janeiro. On May 20, 2020, he left the ICU, after an apparent improvement in his condition; shortly thereafter, however, he suddenly worsened again, returned to the ICU and died on June 2, 2020, at the age of 58.

In a public statement, Super Rádio Tupi thanked him for "the partnership of all these years" and lamented his death.
