= John Jago =

Minister in Newfoundland (born 1684)

John Jago (1684 – after 1724) was a minister at St. John's, Newfoundland.

Born in Cornwall, England, Jago was educated at Exeter College, Oxford. In 1717 he is known to have been vicar of Saint Keverne, Cornwall.

By 1723, Jago was ministering at St. John's, Newfoundland. In order to help bring order to the colonial town, a number of Saint John's property owners established an association in that year. Jago was one of three justices elected by the association to settle local disputes.
