= Jemmy (given name) =

- Pronunciation: /ˈdʒɛmi/
- Gender: Male

Origin
- Meaning: "He may/will/shall follow/heed/seize by the heel/watch/guard/protect”, "Supplanter/Assailant", "May God protect" or "May he protect"

Other names
- Related names: Jimmy, James, Jim, Jimena

Jemmy is a usually masculine given name. It is often short for James or Jimena.

Although popular in the 18th and 19th centuries, the name has declined in popularity.

== People ==
=== Male ===
- Jemmy Botting (1783–1837), hangman at Newgate Prison
- Jemmy Button (c. 1815–1864), a native Fuegian
- Jemmy Cato, leader of the Stono Rebellion in 1739
- Jemmy Dean (1816–1881), English professional cricketer
- Jemmy Grimshaw (1846–1889), British jockey
- Jemmy Hirst (1738–1829), English eccentric
- Jemmy Hope (1764–1847), Irish radical democrat
- Jemmy Moore (1839–1890), Australian cricketer
- Jemmy Shaw, promoter of dog fighting and rat-baiting contests
- Jemmy Wood (1756–1836), owner of the Gloucester Old Bank

=== Female ===
- Jemmy van Hoboken (1900–1962), Dutch painter

== See also ==
- Jemmy, or crowbar, a lever consisting of a metal bar with a single curved end
- James Lowther, 1st Earl of Lonsdale (1736–1802), English politician, called by his opponents "Jemmy Grasp-all"
- John Montagu, 4th Earl of Sandwich (1718–1792), also known as Jemmy Twitcher, British statesman and the eponymous inventor of the sandwich
