= Clara Jacobo =

Italian opera singer

Clara Jacobo (c. 1898 – 23 June 1966, Naples) was an Italian opera singer (dramatic soprano). She began her career around 1923 at the Italian provincial stages. She then emigrated to the U.S., where since 1928 she performed at the Metropolitan Opera of New York. Here she sang in the seasons 1928–29, 1930–31, 1933–34 and 1936-37 batches from the dramatic vocal category.

In 1932 and 1933 Jacobo performed at the Monte Carlo Opera as Aida, Amelia in Verdi's Un ballo in maschera and as the title heroine in Lucrezia Borgia by Donizetti. In the early thirties, she was the great prima donna of Italian opera in the Netherlands. The Dutch audience admired her, among other things as Leonora in "La forza del destino" and in Il trovatore, as Tosca, as the title heroine in La Gioconda, and as Santuzza in Cavalleria rusticana.

In 1930 and 1932 Jacobo performed very successfully at La Scala as Turandot. In 1938, she sang there, the Lady Macbeth in "Macbeth" by Verdi, also 1938, Abigail in Nabucco at the Festival in the Arena of Verona. In 1940 she appeared at the Maggio Musicale Fiorentino as Turandot. In 1933 she was at the Vienna State Opera in 1941 at the Wrocław Opera House as a guest. After giving up her career, she retired in her fifties to an Italian monastery. She made no recordings.
