= Ib (given name) =

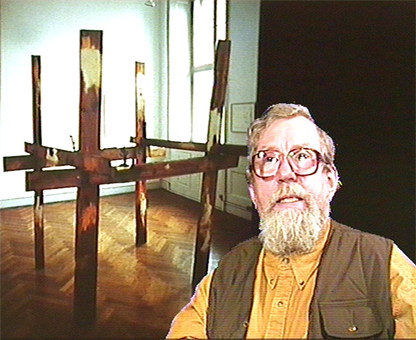
Ib Braase in 1997

Ib is a Danish masculine given name which may refer to:

- Ib Andersen (born 1954), Danish ballet dancer and choreographer
- Ib Braase (1923–2009), Danish sculptor
- Ib Eisner (1925–2003), Danish artist
- Ib Frederiksen (fl. 1986–1990), Danish former badminton player
- Ib Friis (born 1945), Danish professor of botany
- Ib Geertsen (1919–2009), Danish painter and sculptor
- Ib Glindemann (1934–2019), Danish jazz musician and big band leader
- Ib Vagn Hansen (1926–2000), Danish cyclist
- Ib Jacquet (born 1956), Danish former footballer
- Ib Larsen (born 1945), Danish rower, 1968 Summer Olympics bronze medalist in the coxless pairs
- Ib Madsen (born 1942), Danish mathematician and professor
- Ib Melchior (1917–2015), Danish-American novelist, short story writer, film producer, director, and screenwriter
- Ib Mossin (1933–2004), Danish actor, singer, and director
- Ib Nielsen (1919–1994), Danish fencer
- Ib Nørholm (1931–2019), Danish composer and organist
- Ib Olsen (1929–2009), Danish rower, 1948 Summer Olympics bronze medalist in the coxed fours
- Ib Spang Olsen (1921–2012), Danish writer and illustrator
- Ib Schønberg (1902–1955), Danish film actor
- Ib Thomsen (born 1961), Norwegian politician
