= Giacobbe =

Giacobbe is both an Italian surname and a masculine Italian given name, cognate to English Jacob. Notable people with the name include:

Surname:

- Francesco Giacobbe (born 1958), Italian politician
- Gabriella Giacobbe (1923–1979), Italian actress
- Luigi Giacobbe (1907–1995), Italian cyclist
- Mirko Giacobbe (born 1992), Italian footballer
- Sandro Giacobbe (1949–2025), Italian singer-songwriter

Given name:

- Iacob Heraclid, also credited as Giacobbe Basilicò or Giacobbe Eraclide (1527–1563), Prince of Moldavia
- Giacobbe Cervetto (1682–1783), Anglo-Italian musician
- Giacobbe Fragomeni (born 1969), Italian boxer
