= Martin Jago =

British-American poet & stage director (born 1972)

- Born: Martin Jago; 4 August 1972 (age 53); Kent, England
- Citizenship: United Kingdom, United States
- Education: Royal Welsh College of Music & Drama, University of Oxford
- Occupation(s): Poet, nonfiction writer, stage director
- Years active: 1994–present
- Website: www.martinjago.net

Martin Jago (born 4 August 1972) is a British-American poet, nonfiction writer, and stage director.

His debut poetry collection, Photofit, is published by Pindrop Press and his writing has been published widely in literary magazines and journals such as LIT Magazine, The Moth, and Acumen among many others.

His first nonfiction book, To Play or Not to Play: 50 Games for Acting Shakespeare, with a foreword by British actor Alfred Molina, was published in the U.S. in 2012 by Smith & Kraus. His second book, ESL Shakespeare: 101 Everyday Phrases, also published by Smith & Kraus, was released in 2013.

In 2018, Jago published two more theatre books with Smith & Kraus, From Courts to Dungeons, and The Actor's Complete Shakespeare Sonnet Bible.

Educated at The University of Oxford, Jago first trained as an actor at The Royal Welsh College of Music and Drama before a change of career in 2004 to focus on writing and directing.
