= Jaak =

Male given name

- Gender: Male
- Language: Estonian

Origin
- Region of origin: Estonia

Other names
- Related names: Jaagup, Jaakob, Jakob

Jaak is a version of the names Jacob and James in the Estonian language.

People named Jaak include:

- Jaak Aab (born 1960), Estonian politician
- Jaak Aaviksoo (born 1954), Estonian politician and physicists
- Jaak Allik (born 1946), Estonian politician and theatre director
- Jaak De Boever (born 1937), Belgian racing cyclist
- Jaak Boon (born 1948), Belgian television writer, director and producer
- Jaak Gabriëls (born 1943), Belgian politician
- Jaak Huimerind (born 1957), Estonian architect
- Jaak-Heinrich Jagor (born 1990), Estonian hurdler
- Jaak Herodes (born 1944), Estonian politician
- Jaak Järv (born 1948), Estonian chemist and professor
- Jaak Joala (1950–2014), Estonian singer
- Jaak Jõerüüt (born 1947), Estonian writer and politician
- Jaak Juske (born 1976), Estonian politician
- Jaak Kangilaski (1939–2022), Estonian art historian and educator
- Jaak Kärner (1892–1937), Estonian sport shooter
- Jaak Kilmi (born 1973), Estonian film director and producer
- Jaak Leimann (born 1941), Estonian economist and politician
- Jaak-Nicolaas Lemmens (1823–1881), Belgian organist and composer
- Jaak Lipso (1940–2023), Estonian basketball player
- Jaak Madison (born 1991), Estonian politician
- Jaak Mae (born 1972), Estonian cross-country skier
- Jaak Panksepp (1943–2017), Estonian-American psychologist, psychobiologist and neuroscientist
- Jaak Peetre (1935–2019), Estonian-Swedish mathematician
- Jaak Põldma (born 1988), Estonian tennis player
- Jaak Prints (born 1981), Estonian actor
- Jaak Salumets (born 1949), Estonian basketball player and coach
- Jaak Simm (1943–1981), Estonian linguist
- Jaak Soans (born 1943), Estonian sculptor
- Jaak Tamleht (1942-1986), Estonian actor
- Jaak Tomberg (born 1980), Estonian literary scholar and literary critic
- Jaak Urmet, better known as Wimberg (born 1979), Estonian poet and writer
- Jaak Uudmäe (born 1954), Estonian triple jumper
- Jaak Valge (born 1955), Estonian historian and politician
- Jaak van Velthoven (born 1951), Belgian motocross rider
- Jaak van Wijck (1870–1946), Dutch painter

== See also ==
- Kristjan Jaak Peterson (1801–1822), Estonian poet
