= Džeko (surname) =

Džeko is a Bosnian surname. Notable people with the surname include:

- Edin Džeko (born 1986), Bosnian footballer
- Jasmin Džeko (born 1958), Bosnian footballer
- Dzeko (DJ) (born 1992), Canadian music producer, member of Dzeko & Torres
- Šaćir Džeko (born 1956), Yugoslav sports shooter
