= Jennifer Jako =

American filmmaker (born 1973)

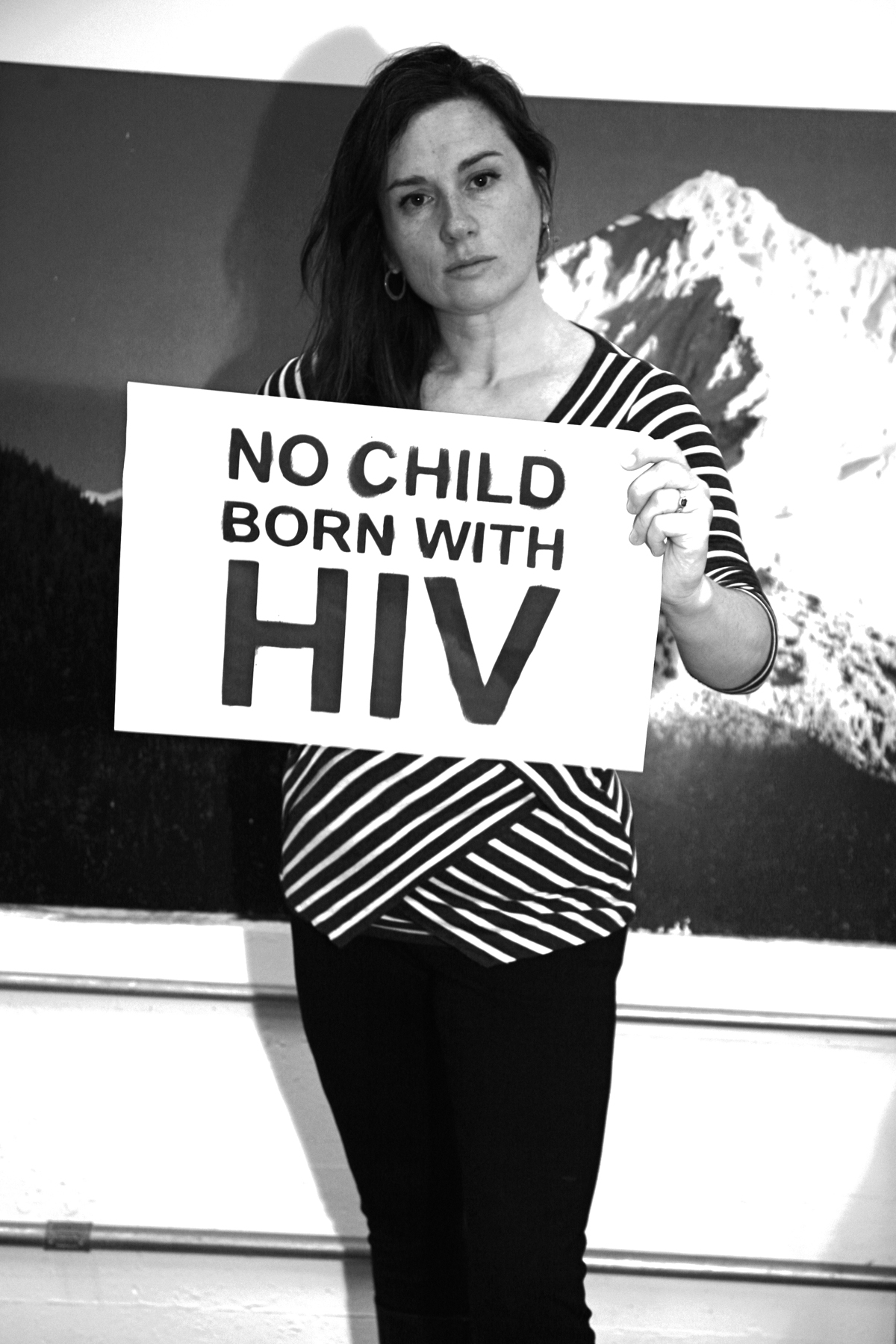
- Jennifer Jako in 2012
- Born: February 14, 1973 (age 53); Drumright, Oklahoma, United States
- Occupations: Activist, filmmaker, photographer, product designer
- Spouse: Christopher John Bleiler (2001-present)
- Children: 2

Jennifer Jako (born February 14, 1973) is an AIDS activist, filmmaker, photographer, lecturer and designer. She is the co-director of the documentary film, Blood Lines, a portrait of HIV-positive youth. Following her infection with HIV at age 18, she began educating in the hopes of preventing HIV infection in young people.

== Early life and education ==
Jako was born in Drumright, Oklahoma, to an Italian mother from Padriciano near Trieste and Hungarian father from Nagykovácsi near Budapest. Jako's nomadic childhood was abusive, impoverished and sometimes homeless.

The countries and states she grew up in include: Oklahoma, Illinois, New York, Colorado, Oregon, Mexico, Canada, Italy, Hungary, the Netherlands, England, Germany, Belgium, Austria, Switzerland, France, Spain, Turkey, and Morocco. She is fluent in Spanish, French, Italian, and English and speaks some Hungarian, Dutch, and German. She attended Summit County High School in Frisco, Colorado, Glencoe High School in Hillsboro, Oregon, Lake Oswego High School in Lake Oswego, Oregon, and Grant High School in Portland, Oregon. She graduated from the latter in 1991. After an initial six months of sexual activity at age 18, she became abstinent.

She studied fine art at Ecole Supérieure d'Arts Plastiques in Monte Carlo, Monaco in 1991. While studying in Monaco, she also worked as a nanny. She went on to study at the Pacific Northwest College of Art (PNCA) from 1993 to 1995 in Portland.

== HIV activism ==
Jako found out she was HIV positive in September 1992, at age 19 during a routine Pap test appointment at which a nurse encouraged her to get tested for HIV as she had had six partners. Jako did not consider herself to be at risk for HIV nor Sexually Transmitted Infections (STIs) and took the test out of social responsibility. When diagnosed, she was told she would be lucky to live to age 25.

Jako became a self-described "HIV poster girl," making appearances on television and radio to raise awareness of the virus. She appeared on the ABC Afterschool Special called Sex Unplugged, a Glamour article on HIV-positive women and their HIV-negative partners, and in 1996 was interviewed on The Jenny Jones Show.

During her studies at PNCA, she began work with another HIV-positive woman, Rebecca Guberman, on a documentary film, Blood Lines. Production assistance came from the Paul Robeson Fund for Independent Media, Wieden & Kennedy and the Henry J. Kaiser Family Foundation. The documentary premiered on MTV as True Life: It Could Be You on World AIDS Day 1998, and continued to be broadcast from 1999– 2004. It is now distributed as an educational video. An updated version of Blood Lines was released in 2015.

In May 2006, Jako appeared on the cover of Newsweek at six months pregnant.

By 2010, Jako decided to step back from activism to focus on her personal life.

== Personal life ==
=== HIV Medications or HAART ===
Jako took AZT for two weeks when first diagnosed, but became so ill that she stopped taking the drug. Afterward, she remained drug-naïve until 1997. After extensive research and pressured by a failing immune system, Jako began a regimen of Nevirapine, 3TC, and d4T. In 1998, she replaced d4T in her regimen with Abacavir because d4T caused severe side effects. Jako has permanent truncal adiposity (a collection of fat at the waist, back and neck, and wasting in the extremities.) She experiences dangerously elevated lipid levels, both cholesterol and triglycerides due to side effects from her medications. The elevated lipids required the addition of Gemfibrozil to control them.

While a treatment advocate, Jako emphasizes the need for patient education and a holistic approach. Her long-term success on one three drug combination or HAART is the result of perfect adherence since 1997. As of 2017, Jako has had complete viral suppression for over 24 years.

=== Family ===
Jako married Christopher John Bleiler in 2001. They had a child in 2005, through artificial home self-insemination. In 2006, their daughter was born via vaginal delivery. At nine years old (2017), her daughter is HIV-negative. Jako continued her strict adherence to a HAART regimen during pregnancy and did not breastfeed her daughter.

== Public work and activism ==
=== Lectures ===
- Universities: Elon, Colgate, Hampshire, Idaho State, Michigan, Washington State, Old Dominion, Virginia Commonwealth, Lewis & Clark, Oregon Health Sciences, Virginia Wesleyan College, Reed, Johns Hopkins, Vassar
- Conferences: Native American Youth Leadership, Sex & TV, Ryan White National Youth, Unitarian Universalist
- Briefings: Capitol Hill Congressional Staff, MTV – National HIV Testing Day, NBPA Supersonics

=== Media profiles ===
- The Faces of HIV
- The Oregonian cover article
- Independent Film & Video Monthly
- POZ Magazine
- The New York Times
- USA Today
- Ladies Home Journal
- Lifetime Television: Full of Hope
- Discovery Channel: Changing Faces, AIDS in America.
- Sally Jessy Raphael Show

=== Book profiles ===
- Girlfriends, Jane Wexler & Loren Cowen, Running Press

=== Awards ===
- Red Ribbon Award, Coalition for AIDS Education
- Ribbon of Hope, TV Cares, Academy of TV Arts & Sciences
- Gold World Medal and Best Public Affairs Program, New York Festivals
- Golden Eagle Award, CINE
- Nominee: Information Programs, Banff Rockie Awards
- Best Short, Awarded by Matt Groening at 26th Northwest Film & Video Festival Program
