= Jaksa =

Jaksa is a given name and a surname. Notable people with the name include:

- Jaksa, legendary descendant of Leszko III
- Jaksa Gryfita (1120–1176), crusader and magnate in Lesser Poland
- Jaksa of Kopanica (fl. 1150s), prince of the West Slavic Sprevani
- Jaksa, a nickname for Nasr Eddin Abbas (born 1944), Sudanese footballer
- Jakša (given name), a South Slavic masculine name, includes a list of people with the name
- Chris Jaksa, emergency physician and former professional baseball umpire
- Steve Jaksa, American college baseball coach and former pitcher

== See also ==
- Jaxa (state), a 17th-century microstate in North Asia
