= Jēkabs =

- Gender: Male

Origin
- Region of origin: Latvia

Other names
- Related names: Jacob, Jakob, Yakov, Jake

Jēkabs is a Latvian masculine given name; it a cognate of the English-language name Jacob and may refer to:

- Jēkabs Alksnis (1897–1938), Latvian Soviet commander of Red Army Air Forces from 1931 to 1937
- Jēkabs Bīne (1895-1955), Latvian painter, stained glass artist, teacher and art critic
- Jēkabs Bukse (1879–1942), Latvian cyclist and Olympic competitor
- Jēkabs Kazaks (1895–1920), Latvian modernist painter
- Jēkabs Nākums (born 1972), Latvian biathlete
- Jēkabs Peterss (1886–1938), Latvian Soviet communist revolutionary, Soviet politician and chekist
- Jēkabs Rēdlihs (born 1982), Latvian ice hockey player
