= Hannikel =

German robber (1742-1787)

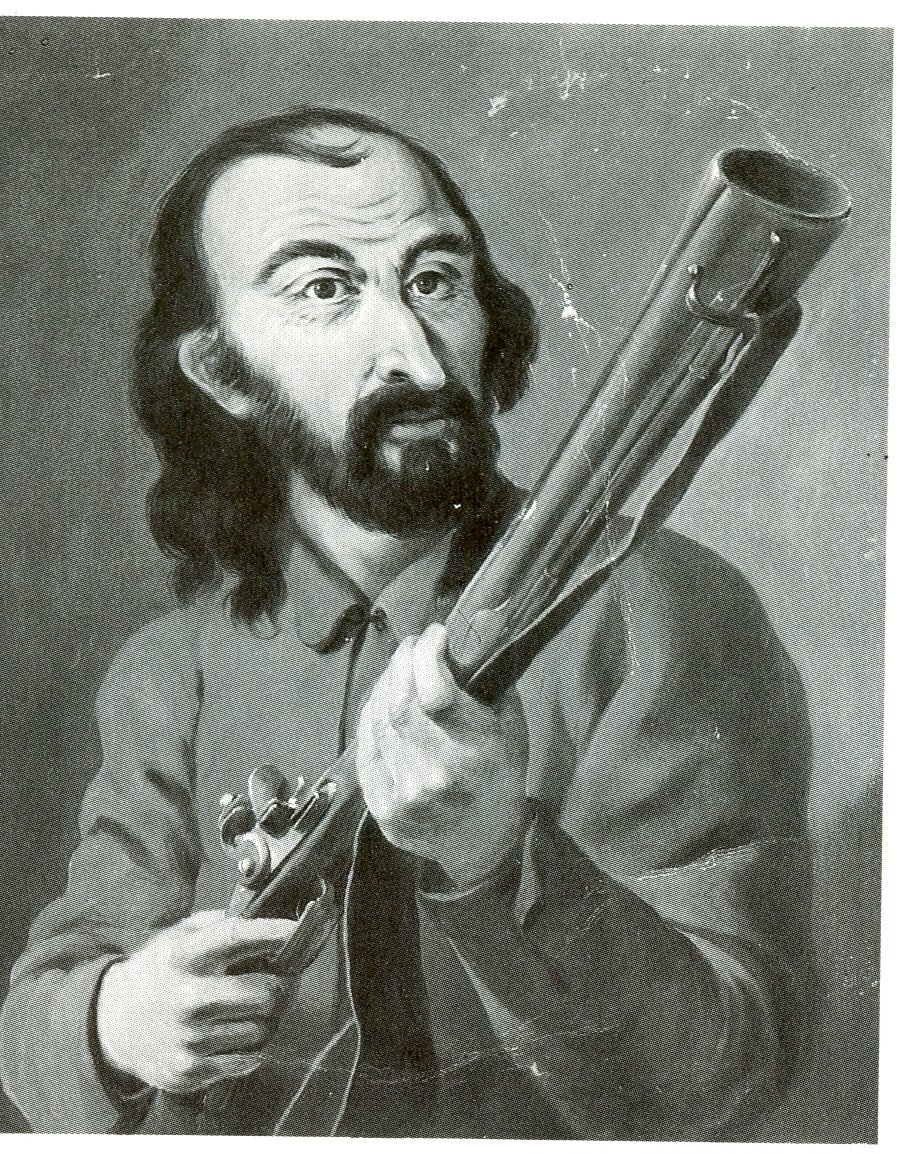
Hannikel, 1787

Hannikel (c. 1742 – July 17, 1787), born Jakob Reinhard, was a robber in Württemberg, Germany, and is today a character of the Swabian-Alemannic carnival.

== Early life ==
Hannikel was born in the area of Darmstadt; his mother belonged to a vagrant family and his father was a soldier in the Landgraviate of Hesse-Darmstadt. Hannikel's grandfather was Kleine Konrad, who was executed by the breaking wheel. As a young man, Hannikel lived in the Alsace region of France and later in Palatinate near Pirmasens, making his living mainly as a peddler and thief.

== Hannikel and his gang ==
In 1770, Hannikel moved to Württemberg and became the leader of a gang, which had around 35 members and was involved in the assaulting and robbing of wealthy Jews and parish priests. These instances of violence became increasingly brutal. The hideouts of the gang were in the Northern Black Forest, close to Nagold. At the time Southern Germany was densely populated by bandits, due to the vast woodland and the fragmentation into small territories, each with its own and independent jurisdiction. The bandits could quickly cross a border after a few miles and were secure in the foreign dominion; the pursuers had to stop at the turnpike.

== Arrest and death ==
When Hannikel brutally murdered a grenadier of the Duke of Württemberg on April 5, 1786, close to Reutlingen, the Vogt of Sulz am Neckar, Jacob Georg Schäffer followed in pursuit of the gang. Twenty-seven members of Hannikel's gang were arrested close to Hohenstaufen Castle, but Hannikel himself and 28 members escaped into Switzerland.

A few months later, the earl of Salis-Zizers arrested Hannikel and the rest of his gang at Untervaz and transported them to Chur. Hannikel managed to escape from the dungeon – today called Hannikel's tower – after some days but was finally arrested by the earl at Sargans. Hannikel and his gang were then confined in Vaduz, where Schäffer collected them in September and brought them to Sulz. Hannikel and three of his gang were sentenced to death and hanged on July 17, 1787, in Sulz. The others were sentenced to life imprisonment at Hohenasperg and the Hohentwiel fortress.
