= Demme =

Demme is a surname. Notable people with the surname include:

- Diego Demme (born 1991), German footballer
- Jonathan Demme (1944–2017), American film director, producer and screenwriter
- Rudolf Demme (1894–1975), German Wehrmacht general
- Ted Demme (1963–2002), American film director and producer
