= Jacoby (given name) =

Other names
- Related names: Jacob

Jacoby is a masculine given name. Notable people with the name include:

- Jacoby Brissett (born 1992), American football player
- Jacoby Ellsbury (born 1983), American baseball player
- Jacoby Ford (born 1987), American football player
- Jacobi Francis (born 1998), American football player
- Jacoby Jones (1984–2024), American football player
- Jacoby Jones (wide receiver, born 2001) (born 2001), American football player
- JaCoby Jones (born 1992), American baseball player
- Jacoby Shaddix (born 1976), American rock singer
- JaCoby Stevens (born 1998), American football player
- Ja'Kobe Walter (born 2004), American basketball player
- Jacoby Windmon (born 2001), American football player
