= Yaghoub Sahaf =

Iranian musician

- Born: Yaghoub Sahaf; 27 October 1946 (age 79); Mashhad, Razavi Khorasan, Iran
- Education: Ferdowsi University of Mashhad
- Occupations: Composer; conductor; music teacher
- Years active: 1957–present
- Awards: Fajr International Music Festival (1985)

Yaghoub Sahaf (Persian: یعقوب صحاف; born 1946, Mashhad) is an Iranian composer, pianist and classical music teacher currently residing in Mashhad.

== Life and career ==
He became completely blind at the age 2, following an accident. Due to his interest in music, Sahaf moved to Tehran in 1957 to study music and Braille. He studied Iranian and classical music at Roudaki art school for four years. Hossein Ali Vaziri Tabar, Manouchehr Rashidi and Javad Maroufi were among his teachers at that period. After returning to Mashhad, through correspondence with some scientific and cultural institutes and universities in the world, including Royal National Institute of Blind People (RNIB) he got to know professors and specialists such as Stewart MacPherson and became a remote student of his. He then started researching Khorasan folk music With the help of those people and institutes. Yaghoub Sahaf graduated from the Ferdowsi University of Mashhad with a bachelor's degree in Psychology.

Yaghoub Sahaf trained many students who went on to become prominent in the field, including Keivan Alaei (composer), Sina Kheirabadi (pianist, composer),
Mazyar Shahi (tar player), Arman Parsian and also his daughter Shahrzad Sahaf (piano teacher) who has also been in charge of musical notation of his book "Sight Reading and Sight Singing".

== Activities, works ==
- Writing the book "Sight Reading and Sight Singing" (Persian: دیدخوانی و دیدسرایی), 2003 (more than eleven reprints)
- Composing the national anthem of Behzisti (State Welfare Organization of Iran) named "This is Me" (Persian: این منم) in 2018
