= P. Chacko =

Indian politician

Poulose Chacko was a member of the Kerala Legislative Assembly from 1960–1964, representing Thiruvalla constituency.

== Early life ==
Born in Kumbanad, he settled down in Thiruvalla. His father was Poulose Upadesi.

Chacko obtained his B. A. and L.T. (present day Bachelor of Education) degree from University of Travancore (present day University of Kerala). Later he joined the Syrian Christian Seminary School (SCS), in Thiruvalla as a teacher.

== Election ==
He was a member of the Indian National Congress and was a freedom fighter. In 1960, he stood representing Thiruvalla constituency for Kerala Legislative Assembly election and won. Opposing him was P. T. Punnose, a veteran Communist party leader.

P. Chacko died in 1978.
