= Yakup =

Yakup is a Turkish given name for males and is a cognate of Jacob and James. People named Yakup include:

- Yakup Ağa (fl. 1462), Ottoman cavalry knight
- Yakup Alkan (born 1992), Turkish footballer
- Yakup Bey Muzaka, 15th-century Ottoman Albanian governor
- Yakup Bugun (born 1987), Turkish footballer
- Yakup Çelebi (disambiguation), multiple people
- Yakup Gör (born 1988), Turkish sport wrestler
- Yakup Kadri Birinci (born 1967), Turkish alpine skier
- Yakup Kadri Karaosmanoğlu (1889–1974), Turkish novelist
- Yakup Kılıç (born 1986), Turkish boxer
- Yakup Kulmiy (1918–1994), Russian Bashkir poet
- Yakup Ramazan Zorlu (born 1991), French footballer
- Yakup Satar (1898–2008), last Turkish veteran of the First World War
- Yakup Sekizkök (born 1980), Turkish basketballer and coach
- Yakup Şener (born 1990), Turkish amateur boxer
- Yakup Sertkaya (born 1978), Turkish footballer
- Yakup Şevki Subaşı (1876–1939), general of the Ottoman Army and the Turkish Army
- Yakup Taş (1959–2023), Turkish politician
- Yakup Topuz (born 1954), Turkish wrestler
- Yakup Yahya, 15th-century Ottoman Jewish figure
- Yakup Yıldız (born 1992), Turkish archer

== See also ==
- Yakub
- Jacob (name)
