= Jaco =

Jaco may refer to:

== Places ==
- Jaco Island, island of East Timor
- Jacó, Costa Rica, a town in Western Costa Rica
- Jaco, West Virginia

== Animals ==
- Jaco is the local name for the Dominican endemic red-necked amazon parrot
- Usual name for the grey parrot in a number of languages

== Arts and entertainment ==
- Jaco, a 2014 American documentary film about Jaco Pastorius
- Jaco, a 1974 jazz album by Jaco Pastorius et al.
- Jaco the Galactic Patrolman, Japanese manga series

== People ==
=== Nickname ===
- Jaco (1932–2022), Jacob Azafrani Beliti, Moroccan footballer
- Jacó (born 1996), Carlos Alberto Guimaraes Filho, Brazilian footballer

=== Given name ===
"Jaco" is a common Afrikaans form of Jacob and James. Some of the better known people with this name include:

- Jaco Ahlers (born 1987), South African golfer
- Jaco Engelbrecht (born 1987), South African shot putter
- Jaco Erasmus (born 1979), South African-born Italian rugby player
- Jaco Kriel (born 1989), South African rugby player
- Jaco Pastorius (1951–1987), American jazz musician
- Jaco Peyper (born 1980), South African rugby referee
- Jaco Van Dormael (born 1957), Belgian film director, screenwriter and playwright
- Jaco Venter (born 1987), South African racing cyclist
- Jaco van der Westhuyzen (born 1978), South African rugby player
- Jaco van Zyl (born 1971), South African golfer

=== Surname ===
- Charles Jaco (born 1950), American newscaster and radio personality
- David Jaco (born 1954), American boxer
- Wasalu Muhammad Jaco (born 1982), Chicago rapper better known as "Lupe Fiasco"
- William Jaco (born 1940), American mathematician
