= Jaakko Pellinen =

Finnish ice hockey player

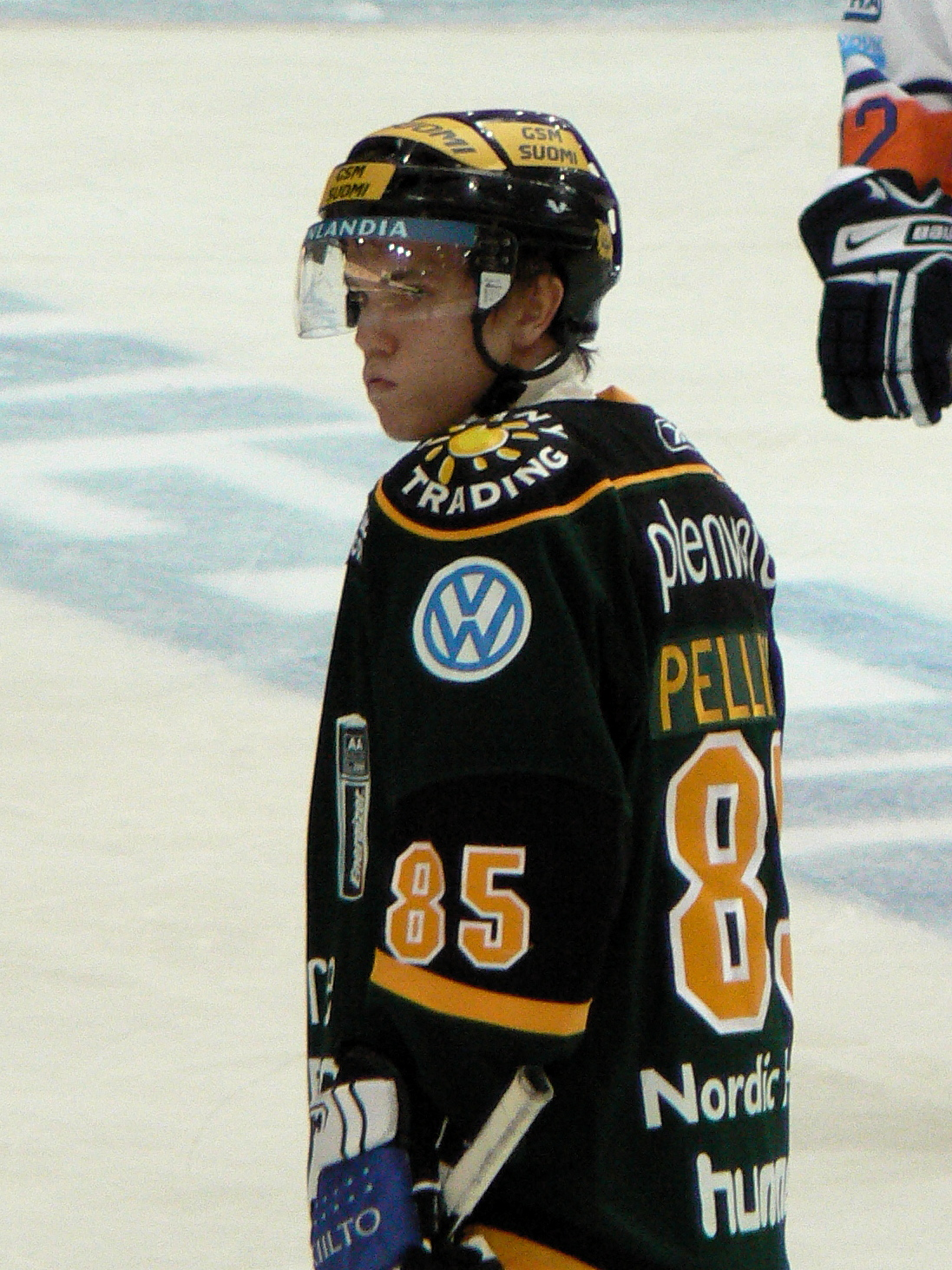
- Born: 18 May 1988 (age 37) Tampere, Finland
- Height: 5 ft 9 in (175 cm)
- Weight: 165 lb (75 kg; 11 st 11 lb)
- Position: Forward
- Shot: Right
- Played for: Ilves; LeKi; Espoo Blues
- Playing career: 2006–2014

Jaakko Tuomas Pellinen (born May 18, 1988) is a Finnish professional ice hockey forward who currently plays for Ilves of the SM-liiga.

== Career statistics ==
			Regular season					Playoffs
Season	Team	League	GP	G	A	Pts	PIM	GP	G	A	Pts	PIM
2003–04	Ilves U16	U16 SM-sarja	21	18	16	34	0	6	3	3	6	0
2004–05	Ilves U18	U18 SM-sarja	24	7	4	11	4	5	4	3	7	0
2005–06	Ilves U18	U18 SM-sarja	4	3	3	6	0	—	—	—	—	—
2005–06	Ilves U20	U20 SM-liiga	37	6	11	17	4	2	1	1	2	0
2006–07	Ilves U20	U20 SM-liiga	39	14	21	35	10	5	2	1	3	0
2006–07	Ilves	SM-liiga	1	0	0	0	0	—	—	—	—	—
2006–07	Suomi U20	Mestis	1	0	0	0	0	—	—	—	—	—
2007–08	Ilves U20	U20 SM-liiga	41	16	36	52	24	4	3	1	4	0
2007–08	Ilves	SM-liiga	3	0	0	0	0	—	—	—	—	—
2007–08	Suomi U20	Mestis	8	1	4	5	4	—	—	—	—	—
2008–09	Ilves	SM-liiga	4	0	0	0	0	—	—	—	—	—
2008–09	LeKi	Mestis	42	15	22	37	0	3	1	0	1	0
2009–10	Ilves U20	U20 SM-liiga	2	1	0	1	2	—	—	—	—	—
2009–10	Ilves	SM-liiga	42	4	8	12	35	—	—	—	—	—
2009–10	LeKi	Mestis	11	2	9	11	2	—	—	—	—	—
2009–10	Espoo Blues	SM-liiga	2	1	0	1	0	—	—	—	—	—
2010–11	Ilves	SM-liiga	34	2	2	4	6	3	0	2	2	2
2010–11	LeKi	Mestis	12	4	5	9	2	—	—	—	—	—
2011–12	Ilves	SM-liiga	55	7	7	14	14	—	—	—	—	—
2012–13	LeKi	Mestis	32	8	8	16	6	4	0	0	0	2
2013–14	LeKi	Mestis	11	0	4	4	0	—	—	—	—	—
SM-liiga totals			141	14	17	31	55	3	0	2	2	2
Mestis totals			117	30	52	82	14	7	1	0	1	2
