= Santiago Lopo =

Galician writer, teacher and translator (born 1974)

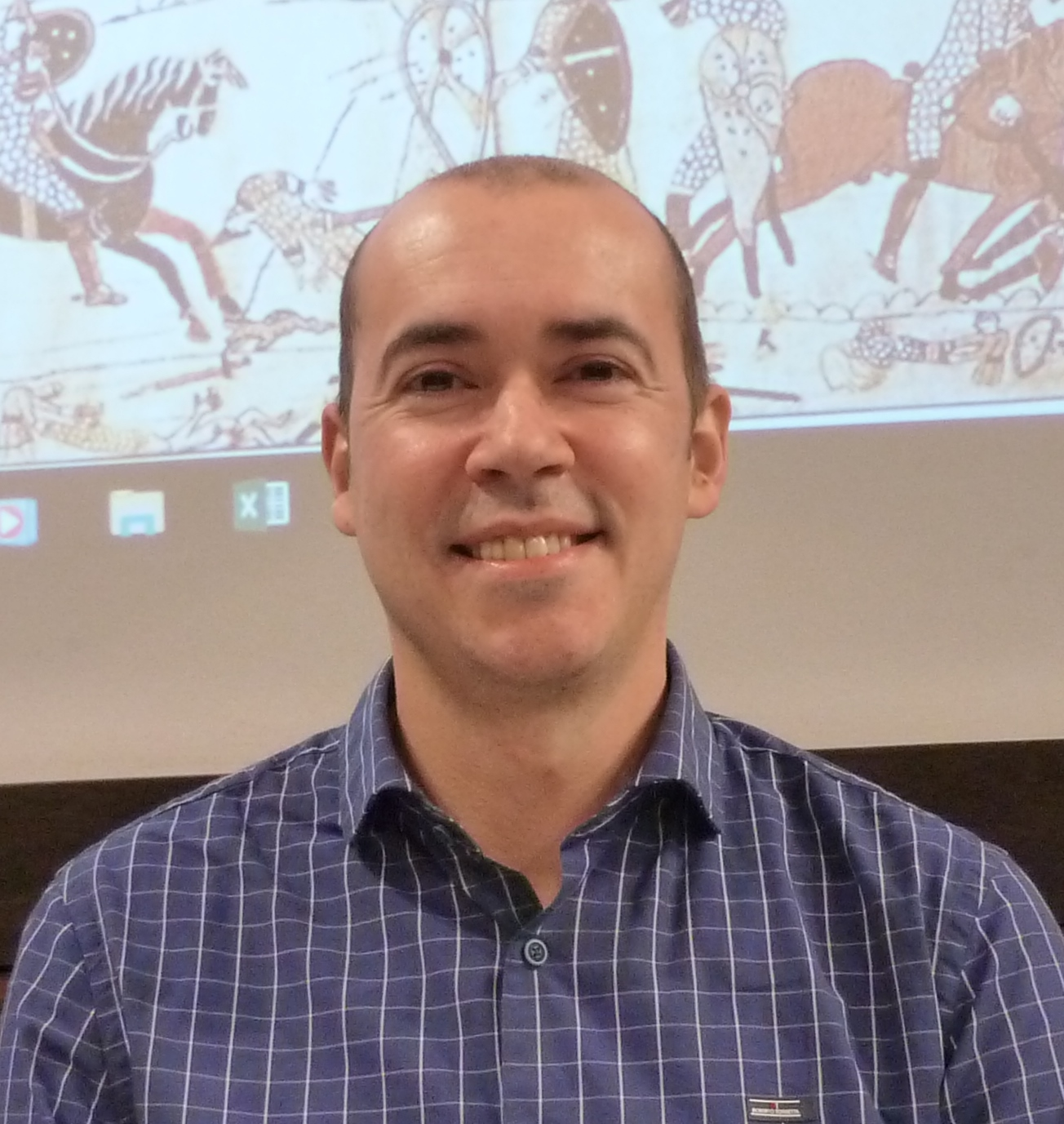
- Born: 2 March 1974 (age 52); Vigo, Spain
- Occupations: Novelist, translator, teacher
- Writing career
- Language: Galician and Spanish
- Notable works: Game over, Peaxes, Hora zulú, A Diagonal dos Tolos, A arte de trobar
- Notable awards: Premio de novela por entregas de La Voz de Galicia (2006), Premio García Barros (2012), Premio Narrativa Breve Repsol (2014), Premio Xerais (2017), Premio Antón Losada Diéguez (2022)

Santiago Lopo, born in Vigo in 1974, is a Galician writer, teacher and translator.

== Biography ==
He currently works as a French teacher at the Escola Oficial de Idiomas of Pontevedra. He began his professional career translating film scripts in English for TV. Since 2000 he has been a contributing writer for the magazine Unión Libre, where he has published several articles and translations.

== Bibliography in Galician ==
=== Novels ===
- Game over, 2007, Biblos Clube de Lectores.
- Peaxes, 2009, Xerais.
- Hora zulú, 2012, Editorial Galaxia.
- A Diagonal dos Tolos, 2014, Editorial Galaxia.
- A arte de trobar, 2017, Xerais.
- A carteira, 2021, Xerais.
- A lingua dos grifóns, 2026, Xerais.

=== Short stories ===
- Sorrí, Nené, sorrí!, 2014, in Grial: revista galega de cultura, No. 202.
- A voz das nereidas, 2016, Editorial Elvira.
- Siméon de la Manche, 2018, in Contra o vento. 30 anos do Premio Manuel García Barros, Editorial Galaxia.
- Nómades, 2021, in O libro da música, Editorial Galaxia.
- A pantasma da insua, 2023, Editorial Elvira.

=== Translations ===
- O meu criado e mais eu. Citomegalovirus, originally by Hervé Guibert. French-Galician translation with Xavier Queipo, 1998, Xerais.

== Bibliography translated into Spanish ==
=== Novels ===
- Hora zulú, 2015, Mar Maior.

== Bibliography translated into English ==
=== Novels ===
- The Postwoman, 2024, Small Stations Press.

== Awards ==
- VI Premio de Novela por Entregas de La Voz de Galicia in 2006, for Game over.
- XXIV Premio García Barros in 2012, for Hora zulú.
- VIII Premio Narrativa Breve Repsol in 2014, for A Diagonal dos Tolos.
- Premio Xerais 2017, for A arte de trobar.
- XXXVII Premio Antón Losada Diéguez in 2022, for A carteira.
- XVIII Premio Jules Verne de Literatura Xuvenil in 2026, for A lingua dos grifóns.
