= Name day =

Traditional celebration in Christianity

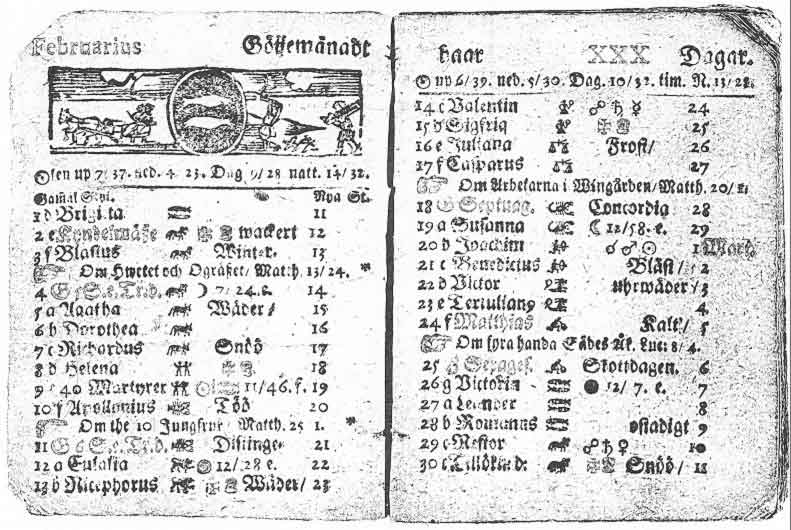
A Swedish calendar page from February 1712 with name days listed. Note that in Sweden, February 1712 had 30 days.

In Christianity, a name day is a tradition in many countries of Europe and the Americas, as well as Christian communities elsewhere. It consists of celebrating a day of the year that is associated with one's baptismal name, which is normatively that of a biblical character or other saint. Where they are popular, individuals celebrate both their name day and their birthday in a given year.

The custom originated with the Christian calendar of saints: believers named after a saint would celebrate that saint's feast day. Within Christianity, name days have greater resonance in areas where the Christian denominations of Catholicism, Lutheranism and Orthodoxy predominate.

In some countries, however, name-day celebrations do not have a connection to explicitly Christian traditions.

== History ==
The celebration of name days has been a tradition in Catholic and Eastern Orthodox countries since the Middle Ages, and has also continued in some measure in countries, such as the Scandinavian countries, whose Protestant established church retains certain Catholic traditions. The name days originate in the list of holidays celebrated in commemoration of saints and martyrs of the church. For example, the name Karl or Carl is celebrated in Sweden on 28 January, the anniversary of the death of Charlemagne (Charles Magnus, i.e., "the great"). The church promoted the celebration of name days (or rather saints' feast days) over birthdays, as the latter was seen as a pagan tradition.

Where name days occur, official lists contain the current assignations of names to days. There are different lists for Finnish, Swedish, Sámi, and other countries that celebrate name days, though some names are celebrated on the same day in many countries. From the 18th century and onwards the list of name days has been modified in Sweden and Finland.

== In various countries ==
=== Bulgaria ===
Name days (Bulgarian: имени дни) in Bulgaria have almost always been associated with Bulgarian Eastern Orthodox celebrations. Some names can be celebrated on more than one day and some have even started following foreign traditions (like Valentina being celebrated on the Catholic St. Valentine's Day).

Two of the most popular name days in Bulgaria are St. George's day (Гергьовден, celebrated on 6 May) and St. John's day (Ивановден, celebrated on 7 January).

Another example of a name day connected with Christianity is Tsvetnitsa (Цветница, Palm Sunday). On this day people with names derived from flowers, trees, herbs, etc., celebrate. Name days are frequently connected with some year or season features like Dimitrovden (Dimitar's day, 26 October) marking the beginning of winter and Gergyovden (George's day, 6 May) heralding the end of it according to traditional folklore.

Name days in Bulgaria are important and widely celebrated. Children celebrate their name days by bringing sweets and chocolates to school. By an ancient Bulgarian tradition, everybody is welcome on name days; there is no need to invite guests. Presents are given.

Common well-wishes include "May you hear your name from grandchildren and great-grandchildren!" (Да чуеш името си от внуци и правнуци!), "May you hear your name only with good!" (Да ти се чува името само за добро!) and "May your name be healthy and well!" (Да ти е живо и здраво името!).

=== Croatia ===
In Croatia, name day (Croatian: imendan) is a day corresponding to a date in the Catholic calendar when the respective saint's day is celebrated. Even though the celebration of the name day is less usual than celebrating a birthday, the name day is more often the occasion of congratulations from a broader number of acquaintances. This is due to the fact that the date of birth is seldom known and the person's name is known to many.

The names that are celebrated on the certain saint's day are all the names that correspond to the respective name and all the derivative names. For example, if there are different versions of the same name in different languages (e.g. John), i.e. different versions in Slavic, Romance, Germanic or other language groups, all the respective names are celebrated.

=== Czech Republic ===
In the Czech Republic, people celebrate their name day (svátek or dated jmeniny) on the date corresponding to their own given name.

Name days are commonly of less importance than birthdays to Czech people. However, name-day celebrations can be, and often are, held together with friends or co-workers of the same name and in this way can grow in size and importance.

In the past, by law, parents were not allowed to choose just any name for a child. This has changed, although it is still common to choose the name from the name-day "calendar". The original list was the Roman Catholic calendar of saints, but changes have been made to reflect the present-day usage of names. Any existing name, Czech or foreign, can be given.

Name days corresponding to some of the most frequently occurring names in the Czech Republic gain slightly more importance than others. For example, the dates associated with the names Josef (Joseph) and Karel (Charles) are commonly known even by people with different names. However, the popularity of these names has decreased in the last years (6836 Josefs were born in 1947, but only 638 in 2014).

=== Denmark ===
Danes have their own calendar for name days (Danish: navnedag). However, the custom of celebrating one's name day is practically unknown in Denmark, and few Danes know when their name day is.

=== Finland ===
Finns celebrate their name days (Finnish: nimipäivä, Swedish: namnsdag) according to their given names on the dates set by the calendar published by the University of Helsinki Almanac Office (Finnish: Almanakkatoimisto). Every day except New Year's Day, Christmas Day and 29 February is a name day. For each day, there are names in both Finnish and Swedish; the names are frequently, but not always, cognates.

Women are slightly underrepresented in the calendar: approximately 45 per cent of name days celebrate only women while some 49 per cent are name days of men. The rest relate to names which may be given to either sex, such as Rauni (15 July), or which feature both women's and men's names, such as Oliver and Olivia (29 May).

There are many traditional beliefs associated with various name days, especially involving the weather and the appropriate times to perform agricultural tasks, such as planting some particular crop. For example, there is a saying that "Jaakko (James) casts a cold rock into the water", meaning that on Jaakko's day, 25 July, the lake and sea waters will start getting colder, which is not far from true on average. The seven days from the 18th to the 24th of July, all being women's name days, are known as "the women's week" (naistenviikko). It is popularly believed to be an especially rainy week, and this is to some extent supported by statistics, as late July and early August are the rainiest times of the year in Finland.

The Almanac Office reviews the name lists at intervals of 5 to 10 years, adding new names as they gain popularity and removing others that have faded into disuse. The University of Helsinki owns the copyright to the name lists and their corresponding dates.

The Finnish Orthodox Church has its own calendar of name days, corresponding to the feasts of Orthodox saints.

=== France ===
In France name days (French: fête du prénom) have long been very important in everyday culture and it was traditional to give a small gift to a friend or family member on their name day.

Some days of the year are commonly referred to by their saint's day: "la [sc. fête de] Saint Sylvestre" is New Year's Eve; "la Saint Jean" is Midsummer (24 June); and so on.

=== Austria, Germany ===
In Austria and Germany name days (German: Namenstag) used to be widely popular in traditionally Catholic southern and western regions, where historically they were more important than birthdays. Since the 1950s, the tradition has mostly disappeared even in Catholic families.

=== Greece and Cyprus ===
In Greece and Cyprus, a name day (Greek: ονομαστική εορτή, romanized: onomastikí eortí, or Greek: γιορτή, romanized: yiortí, lit. 'celebration') is celebrated in a similar way to a birthday, except for expected differences (e.g. no birthday cake). It has been a strong Greek tradition since antiquity for newborn children to be named after one of their grandparents. This results in a continuation of names in the family line.

According to the Greek Orthodox Church, every day of the year is dedicated to the memory of at least one (usually more than one) saint or martyr. If someone is named after a saint, then there is a big celebration on their name day. In Greece and Cyprus, many names derive from pagan Greek antiquity, and there may not be a Christian saint of the same name. In such a case, the person is said "not to have" a name day, or they may choose to celebrate on All Saints' Day. The vast majority of name days are on the same date every year; the few exceptions are names directly or indirectly associated with Easter, and so are floating. The tradition facilitates social interaction, as all Greek language calendars include detailed name-day lists. Some name days coincide with major Christian feasts. For example, people whose names are Chrēstos or Christine have their name day on Christmas, people named after St. Basil have their name day on New Year's Day, Anastásios and Anastasía on Easter Sunday, and María and Mários either on the Dormition or on the Presentation of Mary, mother of Jesus.

The traditional format of a name-day celebration is an open house: once a family or person has chosen to celebrate with invited guests (at home, at a restaurant, a bar or a club) if at all (e.g. following a recent bereavement), all well-wishers may be welcomed. Children celebrate their birthdays and name days equally festively, but as the person grows up the emphasis may shift decisively. Entertainment provided by the celebrating host may include a meal, drinks, desserts, music and partying, rather than the guests fussing over the person celebrating. Gifts are expected from the guests. Optionally, an adult relative or a godparent might give pocket money to a celebrant child or teenager instead of a gift. In cases where birthdays and name days are close to each other, the celebrations are best merged. It is also common to shift a name day celebration to a more convenient day, e.g. to the following Friday or to a weekend. Name days can be celebrated up to 40 days after the nominal date.

=== Hungary ===
Name days in Hungary are well celebrated. Women generally given flowers on their name day, at home and at work as well. A bottle of drink is commonly gifted to men. Children normally get sweets from their families and they frequently take sweets to school to celebrate their name days with their class mates.

Name days at work, are more commonly celebrated than birthdays. This is because name days are a common knowledge unlike birthdays, which are normally listed in newspapers so as on websites. Some of the names have more than one dedicated dates. These differences are related to the fact whether the individual is a member of the catholic church, Hungarian reformed church or etc. Although celebrating name days originates from Catholicism.

=== Ireland ===
In Ireland, name days were occasionally observed in the past. Among Roman Catholics, it was traditional to begin the celebration on the night before, with a decade of the Rosary to ask the Virgin Mary and the child's patron for their needs.

=== Italy ===
The Italian word for "name day" is onomastico (Ancient Greek: ὀνομαστικός, romanized: onomastikós, lit. 'relating to naming'). People often receive small gifts on their name day, and cakes may be baked. Name days are determined according to the sanctorale, a cycle found in the General Roman Calendar which associates a few saints with almost every day. Traditionally, if more than one saint bore a child's name, their parents fix the name day at christening by choosing a specific saint. In the case of multiple given names, the child will celebrate only one, usually the first. In southern Italy, name days have greater significance and may even take priority over birthdays.

=== Malta ===
Similar to Italy, in the Maltese archipelago, the onomastiku is commemorated, also derived from the sanctorale; however, no cultural importance is given to it except in the older generations.

=== Latvia ===
In Latvia, name days (Latvian: vārda dienas) are settled on certain dates; each day (except for 29 February in a leap year) is a name day. Usually, Latvian calendars list up to five names each day—around 1,000 names a year. Recently an extended calendar with around 5,000 names was published, and there are also a few extended calendars found on the Internet, listing names even on 29 February. 29 February is a popular date to celebrate name days of people who do not have a name day; another such date is 22 May. People who do not have name days in ordinary calendars can enjoy many variations when to celebrate—on 29 February or 22 May and, if they have their name in an extended calendar or in the church calendar, on the date listed there (so in a leap year such a person can choose from 2 to 4 dates when to celebrate). The Latvian name-days calendar is updated at one or two-year intervals; anyone can suggest a name for the calendar, usually by sending an application to the State Language Centre (Valsts valodas centrs).

Celebrations are very much like birthday celebrations. It is popular to celebrate name days in one's workplace—usually, the person who has a name day prepares snacks for well-wishers, and during the day colleagues arrive one after another with flowers, sweets and small presents to greet them. Sometimes, especially in smaller companies, a certain time is set for the main celebrations. It is normal to come to a name day celebration without an invitation. At school one is expected to arrive with candy for classmates and teachers. Celebrating name days at home is similar to celebrating a birthday, although it may vary depending on the period of time between one's birthday and name day; usually, one will eat cake with household members and receive presents.

Some families may even celebrate their name days more than their birthdays if the name day falls on a date during a much nicer season. For example: they are more likely to organise a big party for a name day that falls in the summer months than a birthday during the months with bad weather (late autumn or winter).

=== Latin America ===
The onomástico or onomástica in Latin America is the feast of the saint in honor of which someone was named. It is very common for this term to be used as a synonym for birthdays, but this word refers to the list of the names of the saints, so they are not synonymous. Although (especially years before) by popular tradition the newborn son was named with the name that the Catholic saint indicated for that day, the day of someone's birthday does not always coincide with the day of his name. In this way, women called "Rosa" could celebrate their name on the day of Saint Rose of Viterbo in Italy, Saint Rose Philippine Duchesne in France or Saint Rose of Lima on 23 August in Peru; women called "Mercedes" celebrate on 24 September, and men called "Joseph" celebrate on 19 March, regardless of whether or not they were born on those dates. For the devout their saint day can be more important and significant than their own birthday.

=== North Macedonia ===
Name-days (Macedonian: Именден, Imenden) in North Macedonia have been celebrated throughout the history of this country. It has some similarities with the other Balkan countries but there are some name days unique to the country. The name days are scheduled according to the Macedonian Orthodox Church following the Julian calendar. Each month there are several name days which are celebrated by the people with the same name. Some of the name-days that are more significant to the history and culture are non-working days for the whole country. At these days everyone is invited or would like to say "Кој дојде – Добредојде" ("Whoever comes—is welcomed") in Macedonian. Bringing presents is optional (usually wine or something symbolic). A typical phrase to salute the celebrant is "Let your name last forever" ("Нека ти е вечно името", "Neka ti e vecno imeto") or "For years to come" ("За многу години" / "Za mnogu godini"). Among the most celebrated name-days in North Macedonia are St. Stefan (9 January), Epiphany (19 January), St. John (20 January), Blagovec (7 April), St. George (6 May), Ss. Cyril and Methodius (24 May), St. Kostadin and Elena (3 June), St. Peter (12 July), St. Paul (12 July), and St. Dimitar (8 November). Sv Nikola is the most celebrated (19 December).

=== Poland ===
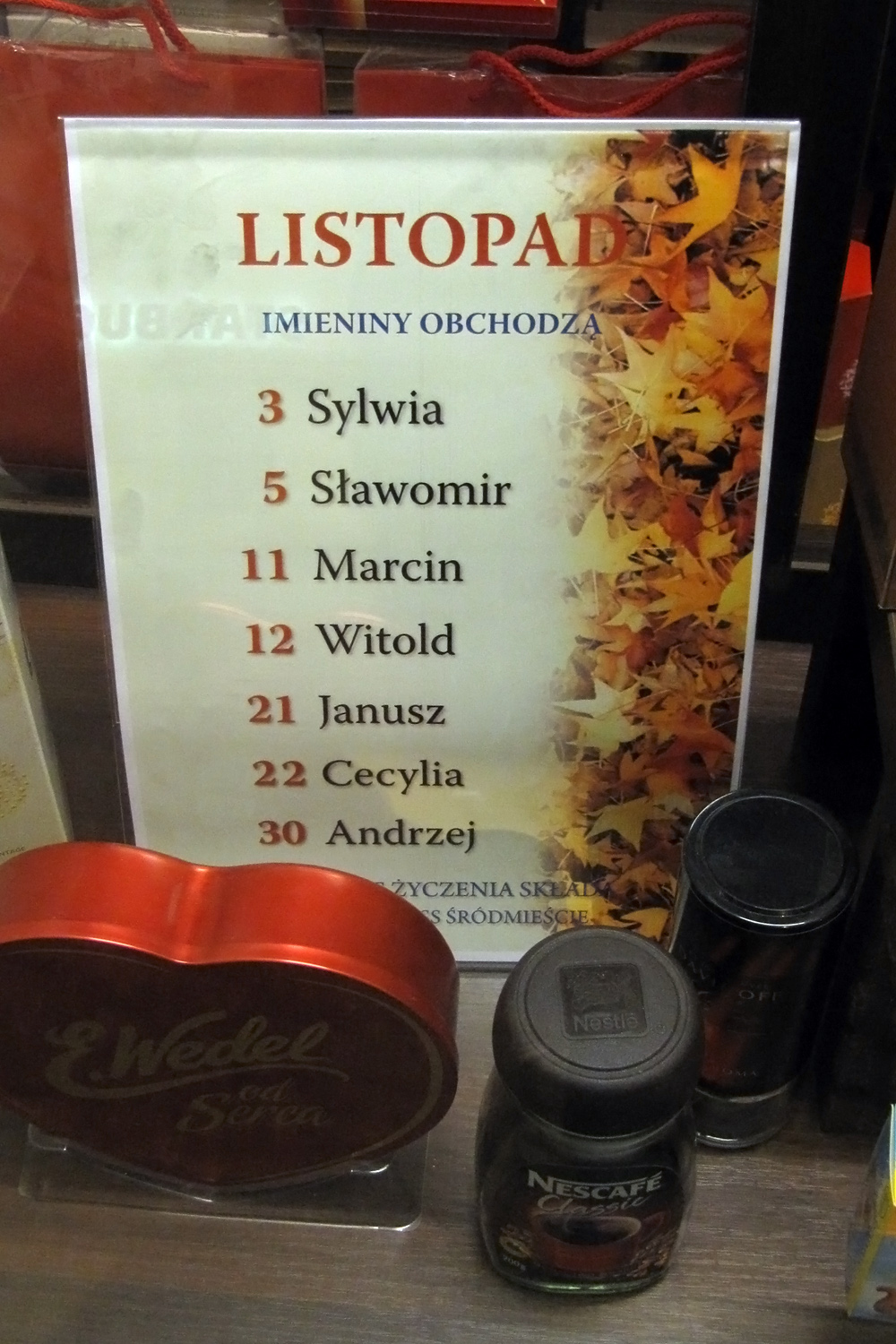
A name day list at a store in Warsaw alongside gifts

Traditionally, name-day celebrations (Polish: imieniny) have enjoyed a celebratory emphasis greater than that of birthday celebrations in parts of Poland. However, birthday celebrations are increasingly popular and important, particularly among the younger generations. Imieniny involve the gathering and socializing of friends and family at the celebrant's home, as well as the giving of gifts and flowers at home and elsewhere, such as at the workplace. Local calendars often contain the names celebrated on a given day.

=== Romania ===
Name days (onomastica) in Romania are associated with the Orthodox Christian saint's celebrations. The celebrations are made very much in the same way as in Greece (see above). Name days are less important than birthdays, and those who have the name of that particular saint celebrate on that day. Some of the more important name days are 1 January: Sf. Vasile (St. Basil), 7 January: Sf. Ioan (St. John), 23 April: Sf. Gheorghe (St. George), 21 May: Sf. Constantin și Elena (St. Constantine and Helen), 29 June: Sf. Petru și Pavel (St. Peter and Paul), 20 July: Sf. Ilie (St. Elias), 15 August and 8 September: Sf. Maria (St. Mary), 9 September: Sf. Ana (St. Ann), 14 October: Sf. Parascheva (St. Paraskeva), 26 October: Sf. Dumitru (St. Demetrios), 8 November: Sf. Mihail și Gavril (St. Michael and Gabriel), 25 November: Sf. Ecaterina (St. Catherine), 30 November: Sf. Andrei (St. Andrew), 6 December: Sf. Nicolae (St. Nicholas), 27 December: Sf. Ștefan (St. Stephen).

Persons (especially women) who have no saint name or who only have a flower name celebrate their name day on Palm Sunday (Floriile in Romanian, which roughly translates as "the Flowers Day"). This name day varies: it is celebrated each year on the last Sunday before Orthodox Easter.

=== Russia ===
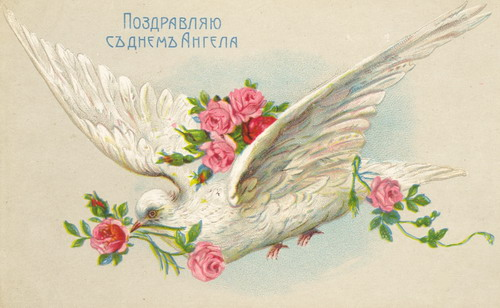
Russian postcard celebrating Angel Day (Russian: День Ангела, romanized: Den' Angela), often used as a synonym of "name day"

Russians celebrate name days (Russian: именины, romanized: imeniny) separately from birthdays. Some calendars note name days, but usually one must refer to a special name-day calendar. Celebrations range from the gifting of cards and flowers to full-blown celebrations similar to birthday parties. Such a celebration begins with attendance at the divine services marking that day (in the Russian tradition, the All-Night Vigil and Divine Liturgy), and usually with a festive party thereafter. Before the October Revolution of 1917, Russians regarded name days as important as, or more important than, the celebration of birthdays, based on the rationale that one's baptism is the event by which people become "born anew" in Christ.

The Russian Imperial family followed a tradition of giving name-day gifts, such as a diamond or a pearl.

References to name days in Russian literature and theatre include the entire first act of Anton Chekhov's Three Sisters, where Irina celebrates her name day, Alexander Pushkin's Eugene Onegin with the celebration of Tatiana's name day, and Leo Tolstoy's War and Peace, Book I, where both the mother and the youngest daughter of the Rostov family (referred to as Natalya and Natasha, respectively) celebrate their name day.

Although the name day celebration is not as popular as a birthday celebration, the Russian word for a person having a birthday (день рождения/den rozhdeniya) is still именинник/imeninnik (feminine: именинница/imeninnitsa), literally "a person whose name day is being celebrated").

=== Slovakia ===
In Slovakia name days (Slovak: meniny) are widely celebrated. Name days are more often celebrated than birthdays in workplaces, presumably because it is simpler to know the date since most calendars contain a list of name days, which can also be found in the header of daily newspapers. Celebrations in elementary schools are different from those within the family, as the celebrant gives candies to their classmates. Within the family, birthday-like celebrations are often held with cakes, presents and flowers. Flowers are sometimes sold out for popular name-days. In the past, the law did not allow parents to give their child a name that wasn't from the name-day list in the calendar. That has changed, although it is still common to choose a name from the calendar.

The original list was the Roman Catholic calendar of saints, but changes have been made to reflect the present-day usage of names.

=== Slovenia ===
Name days (Slovene: god) were widely celebrated and preferred over birthday celebrations, until after World War II and the advent of Communism. In rural areas as well as among certain strata of town people the custom of celebrating name days lasted longer. Nowadays, while the tradition has not been obliterated, name days are celebrated mostly among older people.

=== Spain ===
Until recently, name days in Spain (Spanish: onomásticos or día de mi/su santo) were widely celebrated. Onomásticos are not limited to saints but also include the celebration days of the different representations of the Virgin Mary. For example, the name day of a woman named Carmen would be 16 July, day of Our Lady of Mount Carmel. Currently, onomásticos are still remembered in more traditional families, but are not generally celebrated with festive parties and presents as they were in the past. To celebrate name days, practising Catholics typically attend Mass and have some intimate family celebration. In Spain, children often take sweets or cake to school to share with their classmates.

=== Sweden ===
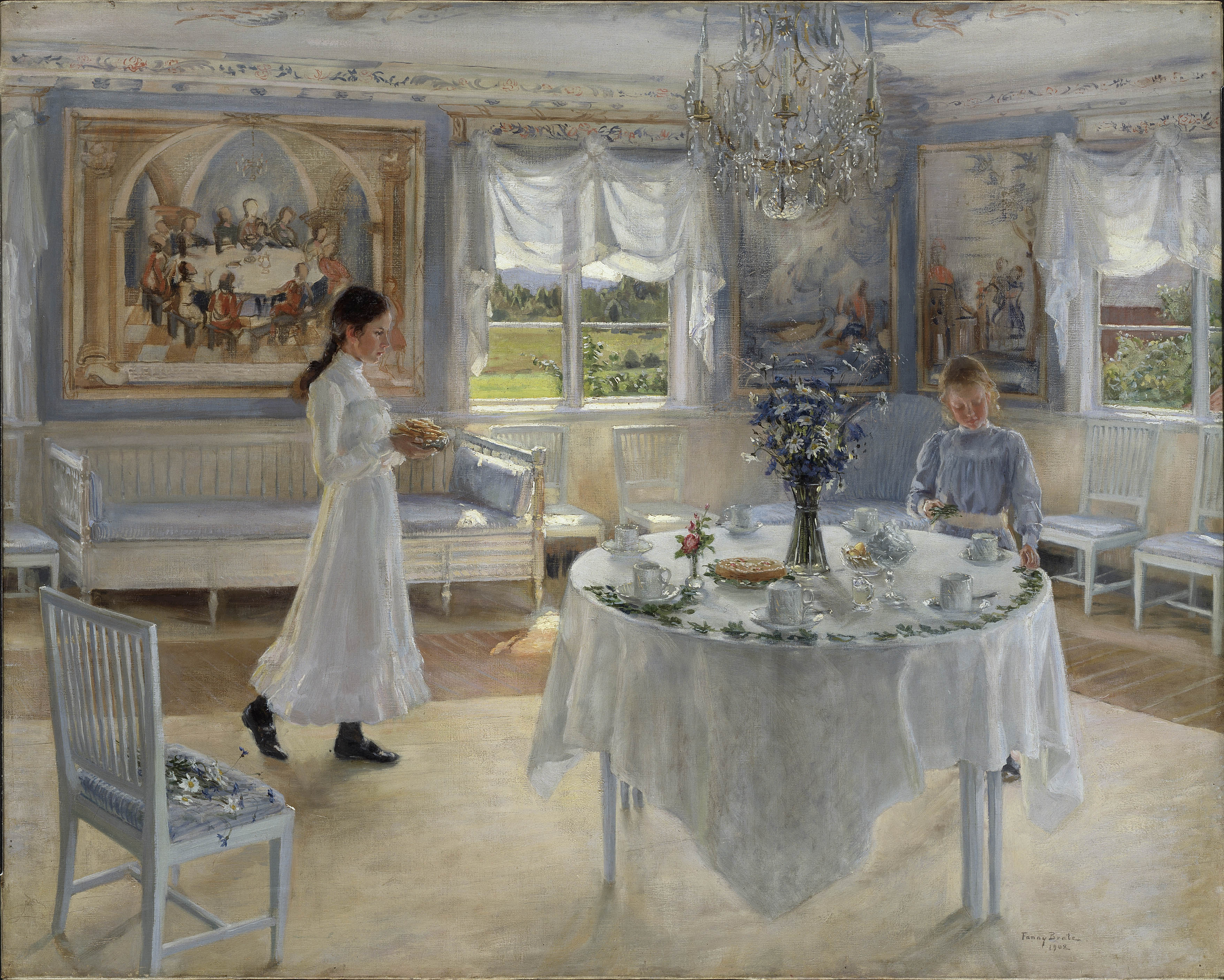
A Day of Celebration. A painting by Swedish artist Fanny Brate depicting preparations for a name-day celebration. Oil on canvas, 1902.

From the 18th century onwards, names used by the royal family were introduced to the Swedish list of name days, followed by other common names. In 1901 a comprehensive modernisation was made to make the list up to date with current names. The monopoly on almanacs, held by the Royal Swedish Academy of Sciences, expired in 1972 and so did the official name-day list. Competing name-day lists began to emerge, but the official list was still in general use until 1986 when the consensus of a new list with three names on each day was reached. This list was revised in 1993 and reduced to two names on each day. However, widespread dissatisfaction with the list prompted the Swedish Academy to compile a new two-name list which was finally accepted and brought into use in 2001. Although it does not have the official status of the 1901 or older lists, it is now universally used in Sweden.

=== Ukraine ===
Name days in Ukraine (Ukrainian: день ангела, lit. 'angel's day') are usually associated with Ukrainian Orthodox, Ukrainian Orthodox (Moscow Patriarchate), and Ukrainian Catholic churches' celebrations of a day when a saint was born.

== See also ==
- Calendar of saints
- Slava (tradition)
- Swedish calendar
