= James (given name) =

Masculine given name

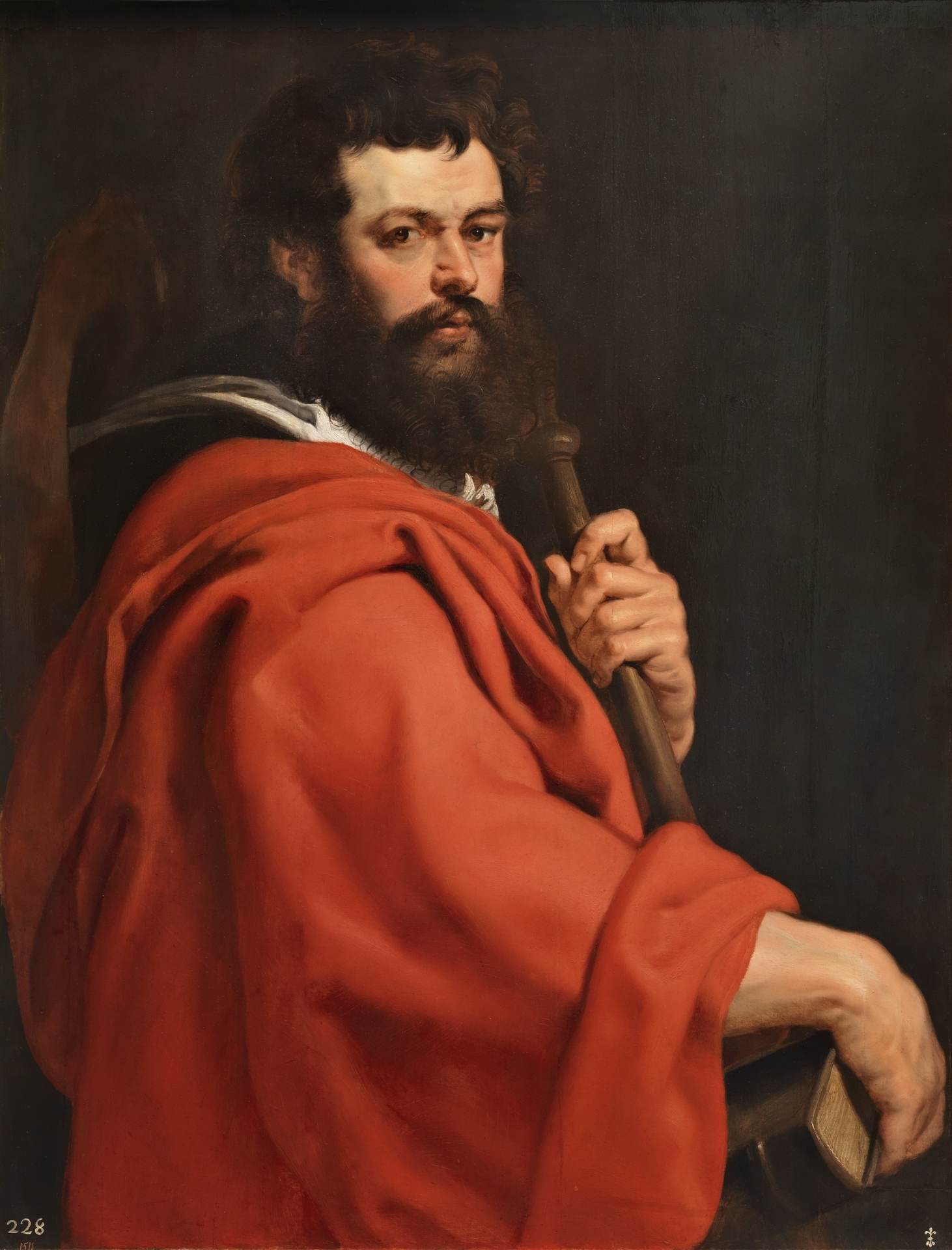
- 17th-century portrait of James the Apostle by Peter Paul Rubens
- Pronunciation: /dʒeɪmz/ JAY-mz
- Gender: Male
- Language: English
- Name day: June 30

Origin
- Origin: Hebrew, Latin
- Meaning: "holder of the heel" "supplanter"

Other names
- Related names: Jim, Jimmy, Jacob, Jakob, Jake, Jack, Jacques, Hamish, Jamie, Jaime, Jemmy, Jay, Séamus, Jimbo

James is an English language given name that is a derivative of the name Jacob, most commonly used for males.

== Etymology ==
James is a modern descendant of the Hebrew name Ya'akov (original Hebrew: יַעֲקֹב), in English: Jacob. The Hebrew name went successively through the Latin form Iacobus, its derivative Vulgar Latin version Iacomus (cf. Italian Giacomo, Portuguese Tiago or Thiago (in ancient spelling although still used as a first name), and Spanish Iago, Santiago), and finally the Old French James. The final -s in the English first names is typical of those borrowed from Old French, where it was the former masculine subject case (cf. Jules, Miles, Charles, etc.).

== Forms of James ==
=== Abbreviations ===
- Jas. (English)

=== Diminutives ===
- Jack
- Jake
- Jim or Jimmy/ Jimy/Jimmi/Jimi/Jimmie
- Jimbo
- Jay
- Jaime or Jamie

=== Variants in English and various other languages ===
- Afrikaans: Jakobus, Koos (diminutive), Kobus (diminutive), Jakko (diminutive)
- Albanian: Jakup, Jakub, Jakob or Jakov
- Alemannic: Köbi, Chöbi, Joggel, Jakobli (diminutive), Joggeli (diminutive), Joggi
- Amharic: ያዕቆብ (Ya‘əqob)
- Arabic: يعقوب (Yaʻqub)
- Aragonese: Chaime, Chacobo
- Armenian: Յակոբ in classical orthography and Հակոբ in reformed orthography (Western: Hagop, Eastern: Hakob)
- Asturian: Diegu, Xacobu, Xaime
- Azerbaijani: Yaqub
- Basque: Jakue, Jakob, Jakobe, Jagoba, Jaime, Jakes; Jakoba, Jagobe (feminized); Jago (diminutive)
- Bavarian: Jackl, Jock, Jocke, Jockei
- Belarusian: Jakub, Якуб (Yakub), Jakaŭ, Якаў (Yakaw)
- Bengali: জেমস (Jēms/Jēmsh), ইয়াকুব (Iyakub)
- Biblical Hebrew: Yaʿăqōb (יעקב)
- Bosnian: Jakub, Jakup, Jakov
- Breton: Jagu, Jagut, Jacut, Jak, Jakes, Jakez, Jakezig, Jakou, Jalm, Chalm
- Bulgarian: Яков (Yakov)
- Cantonese 占士 (Jeem-see)
- Catalan: Jaume, Jacme, Jacob, Dídac
- Cherokee (Tsalagi): ᏥᎻ (Tsi-mi)
- Chinese: 詹姆斯 (Zhānmǔsī), 詹姆士 (Zhānmǔshì)
- Cornish: Jago, Jammes, Jamma, Jamys
- Croatian: Jakov, Jakob, Jakša
- Czech: Jakub, Jakoubek (diminutive), Kuba (diminutive), Kubík (diminutive), Kubíček (diminutive), Kubas (informal, uncommon), Kubi (informal), Kubsik (informal, uncommon)
- Danish: Ib, Jacob, Jakob, Jeppe, Jim, Jimmy
- Dutch: Jacob, Jacobus, Jakob, Jaco, Jacco, Cobus, Coos, Jaap, Kobe, Kobus, Koos, Sjaak, Sjakie
- English:
  - Jack
  - Jacob Jacobson Jacobs
  - Jakob (uncommon, by way of German, Yiddish, etc.)
  - Jacoby Jacobie (rare, chiefly American, and originally a surname)
  - Jake, Jakey, Jaky, Jakie, (diminutive)
  - Coby/Koby/Cobie/Kobie (diminutive, uncommon, chiefly American)
  - Jamison Jamieson
  - Jamesy Jamesie Jamesey
  - Jem (diminutive, also taken as a diminutive for Jeremiah, Jeremy or Jemma)
  - Jacqueline/Jaqueline (feminized, by way of French)
  - Jacquie/Jaqui/Jaquy (feminized diminutive), Jackie (feminized diminutive, chiefly American), Jacky (feminized diminutive)
  - Jamie/Jamey/Jami/Jamy/Jamiey/ (feminized)
  - Jamesina, Jamesa (feminine form)
- Esperanto: Jakobo
- Estonian: Jakob, Jaakob, Jaagup, Jaak
- Faroese: Jákup, Jakku (only in double names such as Jóan Jakku, Hans Jakku. Previously spelled Jacob/Jakob)
- Filipino: Jaime, Jacób, Santiago (religious usage)
- Finnish: Jaakob, Jaakoppi, Jaakko, Jaska, Jimi, Jouppi (archaic, nowadays only as a surname), Kauppi (archaic, nowadays only as a surname)
- French: Jacques, Jacqueline (feminized), James, Jammes, Jacob, Jacquot (diminutive), Jacot (diminutive), Jacotte (feminized), Jaco (diminutive), Jack (diminutive), Jacky (diminutive), Jacq (diminutive), Jacquy (diminutive)
- Frisian: Japik
- Friulian: Jacum
- Galician: Xaime, Iago, Diego, Xacobe, Xácome
- Georgian: იაკობ (Iakob), კობა (Koba)
- German: Jakob, Jakobus, Jeckel (diminutive), Jäckel (diminutive), Köbes (diminutive), Köbi (Swiss German diminutive)
- Greek:
  - Ιακώβ (Iakov, in the Septuagint)
  - Ιάκωβος (Iakovos, New Testament)
  - Γιακουμής (Yakoumis, colloquial, possibly also from Ιωακείμ (Joachim))
  - Ιακωβίνα (Iakovina, feminized)
  - Γιάγκος (Yangos, probably through Slavic languages)
  - Ζάκης or Ζακ (Zakis or Zak, French-sounding)
- Hawaiian: Kimo, Iakobo, Iakopo
- Hebrew: Jacob and James are two separate, yet related names.
  - Jacob is יעקב (Ya'aqov or Yakov), with its diminutives:
    - קובי (Kobi)
    - ג׳קי (Jecky : from Jacky)
    - ז׳אק (Zhack from French pronunciation of Jacques)
    - יקי (Yaki)
    - יענקל׳ה/ינקי (Yankalleh/Yankee – through Yiddish).
  - James is transliterated as גֵ׳יימס/גִ׳ימי/גִ׳ים/ (James/Jimmy/Jim from English).
  - The Spanish name Jaime for James is pronounced in Spanish like the Israeli pronunciation of חיים (Haim or Chaim pronounced Kha-yim and meaning life). Diminutives of Chaim are:
    - חיימי Chayimee (from Yiddish or Spanish Jaime)
    - חיק׳ל/חיימקה (Chaikel/Chayimke from Yiddish)
- Hindi: जेम्स (Jēmsa)
- Hungarian: Jakab, Jákob
- Icelandic: Jakob
- Igbo Jems, James, Jekọb
- Indonesian: Yakobus, Yakubus, James
- Irish: Séamas/Séamus, Shéamais (vocative, Séimí (diminutive), Séimín (diminutive), Séamuisín (diminutive), Iacób
- Italian: Giacomo, Iacopo or Jacopo, Giacobbe, Giacomino, Giaco, Giamo, Mino
- Japanese: ジェームス (Jēmusu)
- Jerriais: Jimce
- Kannada: ಜೇಮ್ಸ್ (Jēms)
- Kazakh: Жақып (Zhaqip, Jacob), Якуб (Yakub, Yacoob)
- Kyrgyz: Жакып (Jaqıp, Jacob), Якып (Yaqıp), Якуп (Yakup), Якуб (Yakub, Yacoob), Каим (Qaim, Chaim), Кайым (Qayım, Chaim)
- Kikuyu: Jemuthi, Jemethi, Jimmi, Jakubu (Pronounced "Jakufu")
- Korean: 제임스 (Jeimseu), 야고보 (Yakobo)
- Kurdish (Sorani): یەعقوب
- Late Roman: Iacomus
- Latin: Iacobus, Iacomus (vulgarized), Didacus (later Latin)
- Latvian: Jēkabs, Jākubs, Jakobs
- Limburgish: Jakob, Sjaak, Sjak, Keube
- Lithuanian: Jokūbas
- Lombard: Giacom, Giacum, Jacom
- Low German: Jak, Jakob, Kööb, Köpke
- Luxembourgish: Jakob, Jak, Jeek, Jeki
- Macedonian: Јаков (Yakov)
- Malay: يعقوب (Ya'qub), Ya'kub, Yakub
- Malayalam: Chacko, Jacob, Yakkob (pronounced Yah-kohb)
- Maltese: Ġakbu, Ġakmu, Jakbu
- Manx: Jamys
- Māori: Hēmi
- Northern Sami: Jáhkot
- Norwegian: Jakob, Jakop, Jeppe
- Occitan: Jacme (pronounced Jamme), Jaume, Jammes (surname, pronounced Jamme), James (surname, pronounced Jamme)
- Persian: یعقوب (Yaʻqub)
- Piedmontese: Giaco, Jaco (Montferrat dialect); diminutive: Giacolin, Giacolèt, Jacolin
- Polish: Jakub, Kuba (diminutive), Kubuś (diminutive endearing)
- Portuguese: Jacó (O.T. form), Jaime, Iago, Tiago (contracted form used in the N.T.), Thiago (variant used in Brazil), Diogo, Diego, Santiago, Jaqueline (fem. – French influence), Jacobina (fem.)
- Provençal: Jacme
- Punjabi: ਜੇਮਸ (Jēmasa)
- Romanian: Iacob, Iacov
- Romansh: Giachen, Giacun
- Russian: Иаков (Iakov) (archaic O.T. form), Яков (Yakov, Iakov), Яша (Yasha) (diminutive)
- Samoan: Iakopo, Semisi, Simi (Jim)
- Sardinian: Giagu (Logudorese), Iacu (Nuorese)
- Scots: Jeams, Jeames, Jamie, Jizer, Jamesie
- Scottish Gaelic: Seumas, Sheumais (vocative), Hamish (anglicized)
- Serbian (Cyrillic/Latinic): Јаков/Jakov (Yakov); Јакша/Jakša (Yaksha); Јаша/Jaša (Yasha) (diminutive)
- Sicilian: Giacumu, Jàcumu
- Sinhala: දියෝගු (Diogu), ජාකොබ් (Jakob), සන්තියාගො (Santhiyago), යාකොබ් (Yakob)
- Slovak: Jakub, Kubo, Kubko (diminutive), Jakubko (diminutive)
- Slovene: Jakob, Jaka
- Somali: Yacquub
- Spanish: Jaime, Jacobo, Yago, Tiago, Santiago, Diego, Jacoba (fem.), Jacob
- Swahili: Yakobo
- Swedish: Jakob
- Sylheti: য়াকুব (Yakub)
- Syriac: ܝܰܥܩܽܘܒ (Yaqub)
- Tamil: ஜேம்ஸ் (Jēms)
- Telugu: యాకోబు (Yākôbu) జేమ్స్ (Jēms)
- Thai: เจมส์ (Jame, Cems̄̒)
- Turkish: Yakup, Yakub
- Ukrainian: Яків (Yakiv)
- Urdu: جیمز (James), یعقوب (Yaqoob)
- Venetian: Jàcomo, Jàco
- Walloon: Djåke
- Welsh: Iago, Siâms
- Yiddish: יעקב (Yankev/Yankiff), קאפעל/קופפל (Kappel/Koppel), יענקל/יענקלה (Yankel/Yankelleh), יענקי (Yankee), יאקאב (Yakab – from Romanian Iacob), and the Gentile name not associated with Jacob: דזשעיימס (James)
- Yoruba Jákó̩bù, Jakobu
- Zulu: Jakobe

== Popularity ==
James is one of the most common male names in the English-speaking world.

As of 2025, James has remained within the top 5 names for boys in Northern Ireland every year since at least 1998, and within the top 7 names for boys in the Republic of Ireland every year since 1964.

In 2013, James was the eighth most popular name for boys in Australia.

In the United States, James was one of the five most common given names for male babies for most of the 20th century. Its popularity peaked during the Baby Boom (Census records 1940–1960), when it was the most popular name for baby boys. Its popularity has declined considerably over the past 30 years, but it still remains popular, and in 2022, it was the fourth most popular boys' name. James is the second most common first name for living individuals in the United States, belonging to roughly 3.4 million people in the United States as of 2021, according to the Social Security Administration.

In 2022, James was the 11th most popular name given to boys in Canada.

== See also ==
- List of people with given name James
- James (surname)
