= Jacob (name) =

Masculine given name

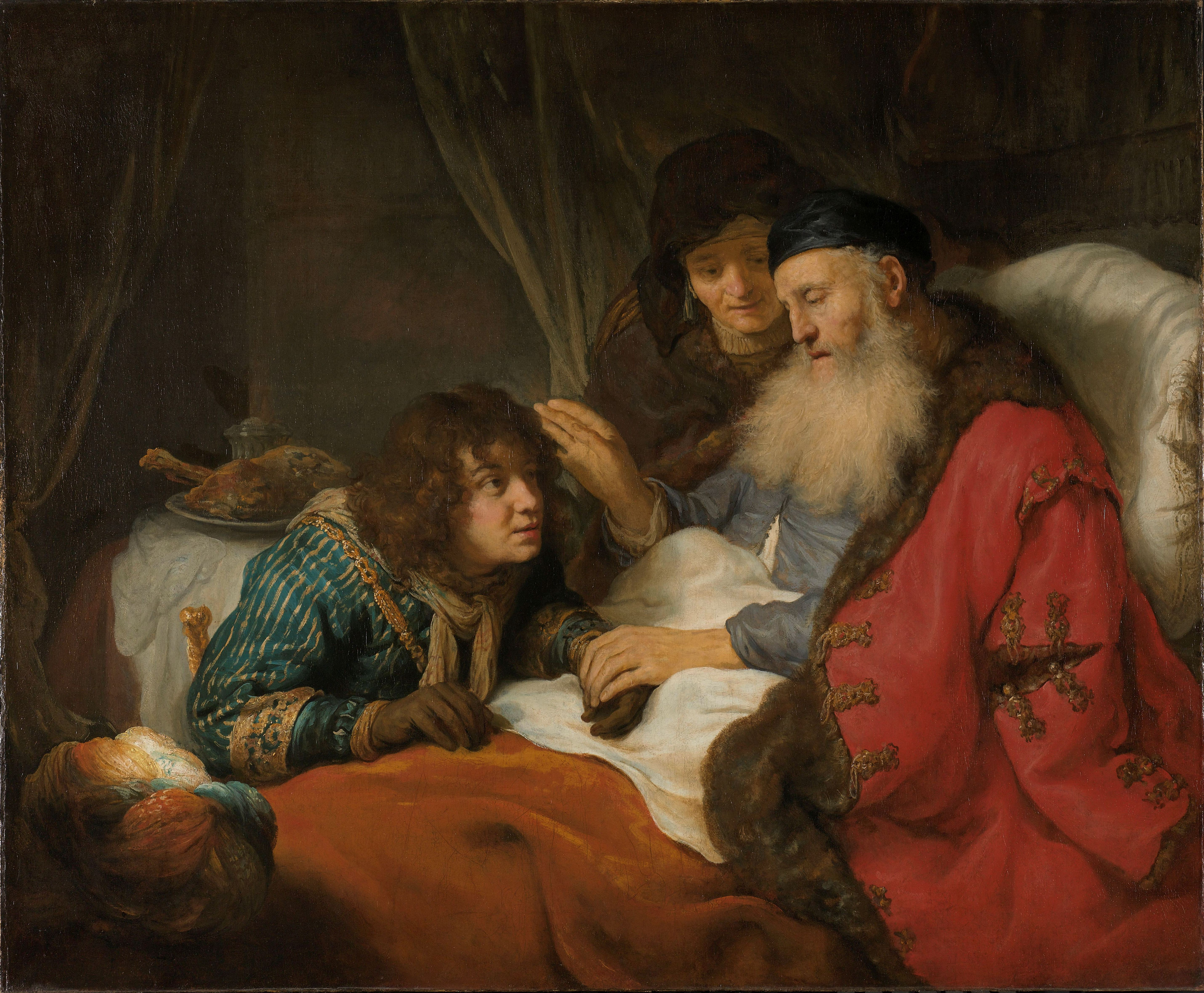
- Isaac Blessing Jacob, 1638 Govert Flinck painting
- Pronunciation: /ˈdʒeɪkəb/
- Gender: Male

Origin
- Origin: Derived from Late Latin Jacobus, from Greek Ἰάκωβος (Iakobos), from Hebrew יַעֲקֹב (Yaʿakov)
- Meaning: "He may/will/shall follow/heed/seize-by-the-heel/watch/guard/protect", "Supplanter/Assailant", "May God protect" or "May he protect"
- Region of origin: Palestine

Other names
- Variant forms: Jakob, Jakeb, Jaycob
- Short forms: Jack, Jake, Jay, Jakey, Coby, Jem
- Related names: James, Jakob, Jakov, Jakub, Ya'koub, Yakub, Yakup, Ya'qoub, Kafka, Cobie, Tiago, Santiago, Diego, Jacobo, Jaime, Jamie, Jim, Jacques

Jacob is a common masculine given name of Hebrew origin. The English form is derived from the Latin Iacobus, from the Greek Ἰάκωβος (Iakobos), ultimately from the Hebrew יַעֲקֹב (Yaʿaqōḇ), the name of Jacob, biblical patriarch of the Israelites, and a major figure in the Abrahamic religions. The name comes either from the Hebrew root עקב ʿqb meaning "to follow, to be behind" but also "to supplant, circumvent, assail, overreach", or from the word for "heel", עֲקֵב ʿakeb. The prefix "ya-" and the internal vowel "-o-" typically indicate a masculine third-person singular imperfective form in Hebrew, suggesting meanings like "he will", "he may", or "he shall". It can also be taken to mean "may God protect" or "may he protect" as Hebrew grammar does not specify whether the name bearer ("he") is the subject (the one who acts) or the object (the one who is acted upon), making the interpretation open-ended.

In the narrative of Genesis, it refers to the circumstances of Jacob's birth when he held on to the heel of his older twin brother Esau (Genesis 25:26). The name is etymologized (in a direct speech by the character Esau) in Genesis 27:36, adding the significance of Jacob having "supplanted" his elder brother by buying his birthright.

In a Christian context, Jacob—James in English form—is the name for several people in the New Testament: (1) the apostle James, son of Zebedee, (2) another apostle, James, son of Alphaeus, and (3) James the brother of Jesus (James the Just), who led the original Nazarene Community in Jerusalem. There are several Jacobs in the genealogy of Jesus.

Jacob and James are now regarded as distinct names in English despite sharing an etymological root. This distinction does not exist in most other European cultures and languages.

== Modern usage ==
From 1999 through 2012, Jacob was the most popular baby name for boys in the United States. In 2022, it was the twelfth most popular name given to boys in Canada. The name is used by Christians in South India as a given name but also as a surname.

== Variants ==
- Afrikaans – Jakob, Jakobus, Jako, Jacobus, Jaco, Koos, Kobus, Cobus
- Albanian – Jakob, Jakop, Jakov, Jakub, Jakup, Jak, Jakë, Jako, Jaku, Jake
- Arabic – Yaʿqūb, Yakub (يعقوب); see also Jacob in Islam
- Aragonese – Chacobo, Chaime
- Armenian – Յակոբ (Classical Armenian orthography), Հակոբ (Reformed Armenian orthography) (Hakob, Hagop)
- Azerbaijani – Yaqub/Yağub, Yaqubalı/Yağubalı, Yaqubəli/Yaqubəli, Yaqubxan/Yağubəli
- Basque – Jakobi, Jagoba
- Belarusian – Якуб, Якаў (Jakub, Jakaŭ)
- Bengali – জ্যাকব (Jækôb), ইয়াকুব (Yaqub)
- Breton – Jakob, Jakez
- Bulgarian – Яков (Yakov)
- Catalan – Jaume, Dídac
- Cebuano – Hakob
- Chichewa – Yakobo
- Chinese – 雅各 (Yǎgè)
- Cornish – Jago, Jammes, Jamma
- Corsican – Ghjacumu
- Croatian – Jakob, Jakov
- Czech – Jakub
- Danish – Jakob, Jep, Jeppe, Ib
- Dutch – Jaak, Jaap, Jakob, Jacobus, Jacco, Jaco, Sjaak, Kobus, Koos
- English – Jakob, Jack, Jake, Jay, Jaycob, Jakeb, Jacoby; see also James
- Esperanto – Jakobo
- Estonian – Jaak, Jaagup, Jakob
- Ethiopia – Yacob, Yacob, Yakob
- Faroese – Jákup, Jakku
- Fijian – Jekope, Kope
- Finnish – Jaakob, Jaakoppi, Jaakko
- French – Jacques, Jack, Jacob, Jayme, Jaume, Jacqueline (fem.)
- Frisian – Japik
- Galician – Xacobe, Santiago, Iago, Xaime
- Georgian – იაკობ (Iakob), კობა (Koba)
- German – Jakob
- Greek – Iákovos (Ιάκωβος), Iakóv (Ιακώβ), Yángos (Γιάγκος), Yiakoumis (Γιακουμής)
- Gujarati – જેકબ (Jēkab)
- Haitian Creole – Jakòb
- Hausa – Yakubu
- Hawaiian – Iakopo
- Hebrew –Ya'akov (יעקב), Koby, Ya'akova (female)
- Hindi – याकूब (Yākūb)
- Hmong – Yakhauj
- Hungarian – Jakab, Jákob
- Icelandic – Jakob, Jakop
- Igbo – Jekọb
- Indonesian – Yakub, Jacob, Yacob
- Irish – Iácóib, Séamas, Séamus, Sésamo, Sesame, Shéamais, Siacus
- Italian – Giacomo, Iacopo, Jacopo, Giacobbe, Giacco
- Japanese – Yakobu (ヤコブ)
- Javanese – Yakub
- Kannada – ಜಾಕೋಬ್ (Jākōb)
- Kashmiri - یعقوب (Yākūb, Yạ̄kūb)
- Kazakh – Жақып (Jaqyp, Jakip, Yaqub)
- Khmer – លោកយ៉ាកុប (lok yeakob)
- Korean – Yagop (야곱)
- Kyrgyz – Жакып (Dzhakyp)
- Lao – ຢາໂຄບ (ya okhb)
- Latin – Iacobus
- Latvian – Jēkabs
- Lithuanian – Jokūbas
- Macedonian – Јаков
- Malayalam – ചാക്കോ (Chacko), യാക്കോബ് (Yakob)
- Maltese – Ġakbu, Ġakobb
- Māori – Hākopa, Hakopa
- Marathi – याकोब (Yākōba)
- Malay – Akob, Yakub, Yaakub
- Mongolian – Иаков (Iakov)
- Montenegrin – Jakov, Jakša
- Myanmar – yarkote sai
- Nepali – याकूबले (Yākūbalē)
- Norwegian – Jakob
- Pampangan – Hakub
- Persian – Yaqub, Yaghoub (یعقوب)
- Polish – Jakub, Kuba (diminutive), Jakubina and Żaklina (fem.)
- Portuguese – Jacó, Iago, Tiago, Thiago, Diogo, Jácomo, Jaime
- Punjabi – ਯਾਕੂਬ ਨੇ (Yākūba nē)
- Romanian – Iacob, Iacov
- Romansh: Giacun, Giachen
- Russian – Иаков (Iakov) (archaic O.T. form), Яков (Yakov, Iakov), Яша (Yasha, Jascha) (diminutive)
- Samoan – Iakopo
- Scots – Hamish, Jamie
- Scottish Gaelic – Iàcob, Seumas
- Serbo-Croatian – Jakov (Јаков), Jakob (Јакоб), Jakub (Јакуб), Jakup (Јакуп), Jakša (Јакша)
- Sesotho – Jakobo
- Sinhala – ජාකොබ් (Jakob), යාකොබ් (Yakob)
- Slovak – Jakub (short form: Kubo)
- Slovenian – Jakob [ja:kop], Jaka
- Somali – Yacquub
- Sorbian – Jakub
- Spanish – Jacobo, Yago, Iago, Santiago, Tiago, Diego, Jaime
- Swahili – Yakobo
- Swedish – Jakob
- Sylheti – য়াকুব (Yakub)
- Syriac – ܝܥܩܘܒ (Yaʿqub), also (Yaqo, Yaqko)
- Tagalog – Hakob
- Tajik – Яъқуб (Ja'quʙ)
- Tamil – யாக்கோபு (Yākkōpu)
- Telugu – యాకోబు (Yākôbu)
- Thai – เจคอบ Ce khxb, pronounced "Ja-khawb"
- Tigrinya – ያእቆብ, ያዕቆብ (Ya‘ik’obi)
- Turkish – Yakup
- Ukrainian – Yakiv (Яків)
- Urdu – یعقوب (Ya'kub)
- Uzbek – Yoqub, Yakob, Ya'qub
- Vietnamese – Giacôbê, Giacóp
- Welsh – Siam, Jac, Iago
- Xitsonga – Yakobo
- Yiddish – Yankev, Yankl, Yankel, Yankele, Kopl
- Yoruba – Jakọbù
- Zulu – Jakobe

== People with the name ==
- Patriarch Jacob of Alexandria (1803–1865), Greek Patriarch of Alexandria 1861–1865
- Saint Jakov, Archbishop of Serbs 1286–1292
- Saint Jacob of Alaska, missionary of the Orthodox Church
- Saint Jacob of Nisibis, Bishop of Nisibis
- Jacob (Book of Mormon prophet)

== See also ==
- Jacob (disambiguation)
