= Jakub =

Male given name

- Pronunciation: Polish: [jakup]
- Gender: Male
- Language: Polish, Belarusian, Czech, Slovak, Sorbian, Bosnian, Gorani (ethnic group)

Origin
- Region of origin: Poland, Belarus, Czech Republic, Slovakia, Bosnia

Other names
- Nicknames: Kuba, Yaki Matcha
- Related names: Jacob, Jakob, Jakeb, Jaagup, Jakov, Yakub, Yakup

Jakub is a masculine given name. It is the Polish, Belarusian, Czech, Slovak and Bosnian form of the name Jacob.

In Polish and Czech, the diminutive form of Jakub is Kuba. In Bosnia and Herzegovina, Jakub is an name used primarily by Bosniaks. However, it isn't really common there.

In surname form, in these regions it goes as follows: in Poland, it appears as Jakubowski/Jakubowska, Jakubowicz, Jakubczyk, or Jakubiak. In the Czech Republic and Slovakia, it is found as Jakubec/Jakubcová, Jakubík, Jakubka, and Jakubovič. Bosnia and Herzegovina utilizes Jakupović, and occasionally Jakubovic but this is much rarer. In Belarus, the variants include Yakubovich, Yakubovskiy/Yakubovskaya. Among Ashkenazi Jewish traditions, it manifests as Jakub/Yakub, Jakubowicz/Yakubovich, Jakubowski, or Westernized forms like Jacobson and Jacobs.

== List of people with the name ==
=== A ===
- Jakub Antczak (born 2004), Polish footballer
- Jakub Apolinarski (born 1999), Polish footballer
- Jakub Arak (born 1995), Polish footballer
- Jakub Arbes (born 1840–1914), Czech writer
- Jakub Auguston (c. 1668–1735), Czech Baroque architect of Italian descent
- Jakub Azulewicz (around 1731 or 1745–1794), Polish colonel

=== B ===
- Jakub Bąk (born 1993), Polish footballer
- Jakub Banaszek (born 1991), Polish politician
- Jakub Barac (born 1996), Czech footballer
- Jakub Bareš (born 1988), Czech curler
- Jakub Bargiełowski (1921–2010), Polish fighter ace in World War II
- Jakub Bart-Ćišinski (1856–1909), Sorbian poet and writer
- Jakub Bartek (born 1992), Slovak footballer
- Jakub Bartkowski (born 1991), Polish footballer
- Jakub Bartosz (born 1996), Polish footballer
- Jakub Bartoň (born 1981), Czech ice hockey player
- Jakub Bednarczyk (born 1999), Polish footballer
- Jakub Bednaruk (born 1976), Polish volleyball player and coach
- Jakub Berman (1901–1984), Polish communist politician
- Jakub Bieroński (born 2003), Polish footballer
- Jakub Biskup (born 1983), Polish footballer
- Jakub Bitman (born 1988), Czech badminton player
- Jakub Blažek (born 1989), Czech footballer
- Jakub Błaszczykowski (born 1985), Polish footballer
- Jakub Bławat (born 1982), Polish footballer
- Jakub Brabec (born 1992), Czech footballer
- Jakub Brabenec (born 2003), Czech ice hockey player
- Jakub Brašeň (born 1989), Slovak footballer
- Jakub Buchel (born 2002), Slovak footballer
- Jakub Buczek (born 1993), Canadian rower
- Jakub Bureš (born 1981), Czech footballer
- Jakub Bursa (1813–1884), Czech architect and folk artist
- Jakub Bursztyn (born 1998), Polish footballer

=== C ===
- Jakub Čech (born 1985), Czech ice hockey player
- Jakub Černín (born 1999), Czech footballer
- Jakub Černý (born 1987), Czech ice hockey player
- Jakub Červeň (born 2001), Slovak footballer
- Jakub Chleboun (born 1985), Czech footballer
- Jakub Chlebowski (1905–1969), Polish Jewish professor and doctor
- Jakub Chrpa (born 1994), Czech ice hockey player
- Jakub Cieciura (born 1983), Polish footballer
- Jakub Culek (born 1992), Czech ice hockey player
- Jakub Čunta (born 1996), Slovak footballer
- Jakub Čutta (born 1981), Czech ice hockey player
- Jakub Ćwiek (born 1982), Polish fantasy writer
- Jakub Cytryn (1909–1943), Jewish painter in the interwar Poland
- Jakub Czaja (born 1980), Polish steeplechase athlete
- Jakub Czakon (born 1985), Polish chess player
- Jakub Czerwiński (born 1991), Polish footballer

=== D ===
- Jakub Deml (1878–1961), Czech Catholic priest and writer
- Jakub Diviš (born 1986), Czech footballer
- Jakub Dobeš (born 2001), Czech ice hockey player
- Jakub Dohnálek (born 1988), Czech footballer
- Jakub Drozd (born 2003), Czech footballer
- Jakub Dudycha (born 2005), Czech middle-distance runner
- Jakub Dvorský (born 1978), Czech designer and video game creator
- Jakub Dyjas (born 1995), Polish table tennis player
- Jakub Dziółka (born 1980), Polish football manager and former player

=== E ===
- Jakub Egit (1908–1996), Polish Jewish leader

=== F ===
- Jakub Feter (born 1987), Polish footballer
- Jakub Fiala (born 1975), American alpine and freestyle skier
- Jakub Ficenec (born 1977), Czech-German ice hockey player
- Jakub Filip (born 2005), Czech tennis player
- Jakub Flek (born 1992), Czech ice hockey player
- Jakub Fontana (1710–1773), Polish architect of Swiss Italian origin
- Jakub Fulnek (born 1994), Czech footballer

=== G ===
- Jakub Galvas (born 1999), Czech ice hockey player
- Jakub Garbacz (born 1994), Polish basketball player
- Jakub Gierszał (born 1988), Polish actor
- Jakub Genjac (born 1967), Bosniak basketball player
- Jakub Giża (born 1985), Polish shot putter
- Jakub M. Godzimirski (born 1957), Polish-Norwegian social anthropologist
- Jakub Goldberg (1924–2002), Polish scriptwriter, assistant director, and actor
- Jakub of Gostynin (c. 1454–1506), Polish philosopher and theologian
- Jakub Grajchman (1822–1897), Slovak poet
- Jakub Grič (born 1996), a Slovak footballer
- Jakub Grigar (born 1997), Slovak canoeist
- Jakub Grof (born 1981), Czech ice hockey player
- Jakub Gronowski (born 1983), Polish footballer
- Jakub J. Grygiel (born 1972), American professor
- Jakub Grzegorzewski (born 1982), Polish footballer
- Jakub Gurecký (2005–2022), Czech motorcycle racer
- Jakub Górski (c. 1525 – 1583), Polish Renaissance philosopher

=== H ===
- Jakub Habusta (born 1993), Czech footballer
- Jakub Hanák (born 1983), Czech rower
- Jakub Hardie-Douglas (born 1982), Polish politician and businessperson of Scottish descent
- Jakub Heidenreich (born 1989), Czech footballer
- Jakub Heilpern (1850–1910), chess master from the Russian Empire
- Jakub Herman (born 1992), Czechice hockey player
- Jakub Hlava (born 1979), Czech ski jumper
- Jakub Holuša (born 1988), Czech middle-distance runner
- Jakub Holúbek (born 1991), Slovak footballer
- Jakub Hora (born 1991), Czech footballer
- Jakub Hottek (born 1983), Czech footballer
- Jakub Hromada (born 1996) Slovak footballer
- Jakub Hronec (born 1992), Slovak footballer
- Jakub Hrstka (born 1990), Czech handball player
- Jakub Hrůša (born 1981), Czech conductor
- Jakub Husník (1837–1916), Czech painter, art teacher
- Jakub Hyman (born 1984), Czech luger

=== I ===
- Jakub Illéš (born 1995), Czech ice hockey player
- Jakub Iskra (born 2002), Polish footballer

=== J ===
- Jakub Jakubko (born 2004), Slovak footballer
- Jakub Jakubov (born 1989), Slovak footballer
- Jakub Jamróg (born 1991), Polish speedway rider
- Jakub Janda (born 1978), Czech ski jumper
- Jakub Jáně (born 1990), Czech slalom canoeist
- Jakub Janetzký (born 1997), Czech footballer
- Jakub Jankto (born 1996), Czech footballer
- Jakub Janouch (born 1990), Czech volleyball player
- Jakub Jarosz (born 1987), Polish volleyball player
- Jakub Jasiński (1761–1794), Polish general
- Jakub Jaworowski (born 1981), Polish politician
- Jakub Jaworski (born 1986), Polish short-track speed-skater
- Jakub Jelonek (born 1985), Polish race walker
- Jakub Jesionkowski (born 1989), Polish footballer
- Jakub Jeřábek (born 1991), Czech ice hockey player
- Jakub Jiroutek (born 1977), Czech ski jumper
- Jakub Jugas (born 1992), Czech footballer
- Jakub Jurka (born 1999), Czech fencer

=== K ===
- Jakub Kaczmarek (born 1993), Polish racing cyclist
- Jakub Kadák (born 2000), Slovak footballer
- Jakub Kafka (born 1976), Czech footballer
- Jakub Kagan (1896–1942), Polish-Jewish composer, pianist, jazz musician and arranger
- Jakub Kałuziński (born 2002), Polish footballer
- Jakub Kamiński (born 2002), Polish footballer
- Jakub Kania (ice hockey) (born 1990), Czech ice hockey player
- Jakub Kania (poet) (1872–1957), Polish poet, folk writer and national activist
- Jakub Karbownik (born 2001), Polish footballer
- Jakub Karol Parnas (1884–1949), Polish–Soviet biochemist
- Jakub Kastelovič (born 1995), Slovak footballer
- Jakub Kaszuba (fighter) (born 1995), Polish mixed martial artist
- Jakub Kaszuba (footballer) (born 1988), Polish footballer
- Jakub Kawa (born 1988), Polish footballer
- Jakub Kiełb (born 1993), Polish footballer
- Jakub Kindl (born 1987), Czech ice hockey player
- Jakub Kisiel (born 2003), Polish footballer
- Jakub Kiwior (born 2000), Polish footballer
- Jakub Klepiš (born 1984), Czech ice hockey player
- Jakub Klášterka (born 1994), Czech racing driver
- Jakub Kobylański (died 1454), Polish knight and castellan
- Jakub Kochanowski (born 1997), Polish volleyball player
- Jakub Kohák (born 1972), Czech actor and film director
- Jakub Kolski (1899–1941), Polish chess master
- Jakub Kolář (born, 1992), Czech ice hockey player
- Jakub Kołas (1882–1956), Belarusian poet and writer
- Jakub Konečný (born 2002), Czech ice hockey player
- Jakub Kopf (1915–1983), Polish basketball player
- Jakub Koreis (born 1984), Czech ice hockey player
- Jakub Kornfeil (born 1993), Czech motorcycle racer and jet surfer
- Jakub Kosakowski (born 2002), Polish chess player
- Jakub Kosecki (born 1990), Polish footballer
- Jakub Kosorin (born 1995), Slovak footballer
- Jakub Kosowicz (born 1994), Polish acrobatic gymnast
- Jakub Kostiuczuk (born 1966), Archbishop of Białystok and Gdańsk
- Jakub Kot (born 1990), Polish ski jumper
- Jakub Kotala (born 1996), Czech ice hockey player
- Jakub Kousal (born 2002), Czech footballer
- Jakub Kovář (born 1988), Czech ice hockey player
- Jakub Kowalewski (born 1994), Polish luger
- Jakub Kowalski (born 1987), Polish footballer
- Jakub Krako (born 1990), Slovak visually impaired alpine skier
- Jakub Kraska (born 2000), Polish swimmer
- Jakub Krejčí (born 2002), Czech slalom canoeist
- Jakub Krejčík (born 1991), Czech ice hockey player
- Jakub Kresa (1648–1715), Czech mathematician
- Jakub Kroner (born 1987), Slovak filmmaker
- Jakub Melissaeus Krtský (1554–1599), Hussite teacher and priest in Bohemia
- Jakub Krupa (born 1985), Czech handball player
- Jakub Krzewina (born 1989), Polish track and field sprinter
- Jakub Krzyżanowski (born 2006), Polish footballer
- Jakub Krč (born 1997), Slovak footballer
- Jakub Krčín (1535–1604), Czech architect and engineer
- Jakub Kubicki (1758–1833), Polish classicist architect and designer
- Jakub Kucner (born 1988), Polish male fashion model and actor
- Jakub Kulesza (born 1990), Polish politician
- Jakub Kulhánek (born 1984), Czech diplomat and politician
- Jakub Kumoch (born 1975), Polish political scientist and journalist
- Jakub Kunvaldský (1528–1578), Czech Lutheran clergyman
- Jakub Kuzdra (born 1997), Polish footballer
- Jakub Kučera (born 1997), Czech footballer

=== L ===
- Jakub Łabojko (born 1997), Polish footballer
- Jakub Landovský (born 1976), Czech politician, lawyer
- Jakub Langhammer (born 1984), Czech ice hockey player
- Jakub Ignacy Łaszczyński (1791–1865), Polish regional administrator
- Jakub Lauko (born 2000), Czech ice hockey player
- Jakub Legierski (born 1994), Polish footballer
- Jakub Lejkin (1906–1942), Polish lawyer, administrator at the Warsaw Ghetto
- Jakub Lev (born 1990), Czech ice hockey player
- Jakub Lewicki (born 2005), Polish footballer
- Jakub Lofek (born 2005), Polish figure skater
- Jakub Łucak (born 1989), Polish handball player
- Jakub Luka (born 2003), Slovak footballer
- Jakub Łukowski (born 1996), Polish footballer

=== M ===
- Jakub Majerski (born 2000), Polish swimmer
- Jakub Makovička (born 1981), Czech rower
- Jakub Malczewski (born 1974), Polish alpine skier
- Jakub Málek (born 2002), Czech ice hockey player
- Jakub Malý (1811–1885), Czech historian, writer and journalist
- Jakub Mareczko (born 1994), Italian road cyclist of Polish origin
- Jakub Marek (born 1991), Czech ice hockey player
- Jakub Mareš (born 1987), Czech footballer
- Jakub Markovič (born 2001), Czech footballer
- Jakub Martinec (footballer) (born 1998), Czech footballer
- Jakub Martinec (musical artist) (born 1979), Czech musician, conductor and choirmaster.
- Jakub Matai (born 1993), Czech ice hockey player
- Jakub Maxa (born 1989), Czech ice hockey player
- Jakub May (born 1975), Polish drummer
- Jakub Menšík (born 2005), Czech tennis player
- Jakub Michlewicz (1929 – 2013), Polish Jewish member of the Polish Home Army and a child soldier in the Warsaw Uprising
- Jakub Michlík (born 1997), Slovak footballer
- Jakub Michálek (born 1989), Czech politician
- Jakub Milewski (died 1586), Polish Catholic priest
- Jakub Miszczuk (born 1990), Polish footballer
- Jakub Miśkowiak (born 2001), Polish motorcycle speedway rider
- Jakub Moder (born 1999), Polish footballer
- Jakub Molęda (born 1984), Polish singer, composer and theatre actor
- Jakub Mortkowicz (1876−1931), Polish book publisher and bookseller
- Jakub Myszor (born 2002), Polish footballer

=== N ===
- Jakub Nábělek (born 1982), Czech rally driver
- Jakub Nakcjanowicz (1725–1777), Jesuit priest, mathematician, and astronomer of the Polish–Lithuanian Commonwealth
- Jakub Nakládal (born 1987), Czech ice hockey player
- Jakub Natanson (1832–1884), Polish Jewish chemist and banker
- Jakub Navrátil (born 1984), Czech footballer
- Jakub Nemec (born 1992), Slovak footballer
- Jakub Nečas (born 1995), Czech footballer
- Jakub Niemczyk (born 2004), Polish footballer
- Jakub Niewiadomski (born 2002), Polish footballer
- Jakub Nosek (born 1989), Czech bobsledder
- Jakub Novotný (born 1979), Czech volleyball player
- Jakub Novák (Czech cyclist) (born 1990), Czech cyclist
- Jakub Novák (Slovak cyclist) (born 1988), Slovak cyclist
- Jakub Nowakowski (footballer) (born 2001), Polish footballer
- Jakub Tomasz Nowakowski (born 1924), Polish zoologist, participant of the Warsaw Uprising

=== O ===
- Jakub Obrovský (1882–1949), Czechoslovak artist, sculptor and writer
- Jakub Ojrzyński (born 2003), Polish footballer
- Jakub Józef Orliński (born 1990), Polish singer
- Jakub Orsava (born 1991), Czech hockey player
- Jakub Ostroróg (c. 1516–1568), Polish magnate and politician
- Jakub Otruba (born 1998), Czech racing cyclist

=== P ===
- Jakub W.J. Pacholski (1862–1932), Polish-American Roman Catholic priest
- Jakub Paul (born 1999), Swiss tennis player
- Jakub Paur (born 1992), Slovak footballer
- Jakub Paś (born 1977), Polish scientist and developer
- Jakub Petr (born 1990), Czech footballer
- Jakub Petružálek (born 1985), Czech ice hockey player
- Jakub Pešek (born 1993), Czech footballer
- Jakub Pícha (born 1991), Czech footballer
- Jakub Piotrowski (born 1997), Polish footballer
- Jakub Plichta (died 1407), Catholic priest, second bishop of Vilnius
- Jakub Plánička (born 1984), Czech footballer
- Jakub Plšek (born 1993), Czech footballer
- Jakub Podaný (born 1987), Czech footballer
- Jakub Podrazil (born 1992), Czech rower
- Jakub Pokorný (born 1996), Czech footballer
- Jakub Polaczyk (born 1983), Polish-American composer and pianist
- Jakub Polak (musician) (c. 1545 – c. 1605), Polish lutenist and composer
- Jakub Polák (anarchist) (1952–2012), Czech anarchist and anti-racism activist
- Jakub Popielarz (born 1990), Polish footballer
- Jakub Popiwczak (born 1996), Polish volleyball player
- Jakub Považanec (born 1991), Slovak footballer
- Jakub Přichystal (born 1995), Czech footballer
- Jakub Przygoński (born 1985), Polish racing driver
- Jakub Prüher (born 1968), Czech slalom canoeist
- Jakub Puchow (born 1947), Polish diver

=== R ===
- Jakub Rada (born 1987), Czech footballer
- Jakub Rezek (born 1998), Czech footballer
- Jakub Řezníček (born 1988), Czech footballer
- Jakub Rolinc (born 1992), Czech footballer
- Jakub Rondzik (born 1986), Slovak footballer
- Jakub Różalski (born 1981), Polish artist
- Jakub Rutnicki (born 1978), Polish politician
- Jakub Jan Ryba (1765–1815), Czech teacher and composer
- Jakub Rybárik (born 1986), Slovak actor.
- Jakub Rzeźniczak (born 1986), Polish footballer

=== S ===
- Jakub Sangowski (born 2002), Polish footballer
- Jakub Šašinka (born 1995), Czech footballer
- Jakub Schikaneder (1855–1924), Czech painter and art professor
- Jakub Šebesta (born 1948), Czech politician
- Jakub Sedláček (footballer) (born 1998), Slovak footballer
- Jakub Sedláček (ice hockey) (born 1990), Czech ice hockey player
- Jakub Selimoski (born 1946), Last Grand Mufti of Yugoslavia.
- Jakub Serafin (born 1996), Polish footballer
- Jakub Sienieński (died 1639), Polish nobleman
- Jakub of Sienno (1413–1480), Polish bishop
- Jakub Šiman (born 1995), Czech footballer
- Jakub Šimoňák (born 1996), Slovak luger
- Jakub Šindel (born 1986), Czech ice hockey player
- Jakub Šindelář (born 1986), Czech handball player
- Jakub Sinior (born 2000), Polish footballer
- Jakub Šípek (born 1999), Czech footballer
- Jakub Šiřina (born 1987), Czech basketball player
- Jakub Škarek (born 1999), Czech ice hockey player
- Jakub Skiba (born 1961), Polish civil servant and diplomat
- Jakub Skierka (born 1998), Polish swimmer
- Jakub Sklenář (footballer) (born 1990), Czech footballer
- Jakub Sklenář (ice hockey) (born 1988), Czech ice hockey player
- Jakub Skrobanek (c. 1835–1910), merchant, banker and mayor of Cieszyn
- Jakub Skrzyniarz (born 1996), Polish handball player
- Jakub Sládek (born 1990), Czech baseball player
- Jakub Sławek (born 1976), Polish diplomat
- Jakub Słowik (born 1991), Polish footballer
- Jakub Smektała (born 1987), Polish footballer
- Jakub Śmiechowski (born 1991), Polish racing driver
- Jakub Smrž (born 1983), Czech motorcycle road racer
- Jakub Smug (1914–2010), Polish footballer
- Jakub Sobieski (1590–1646), Polish nobleman
- Jakub Sokolík (born 1993), Czech footballer
- Jakub Solnický (born 1994), Czech squash player
- Jakub Špicar (born 1993), Czech sprint canoeist
- Jakub Šťastný (born 2000), Czech track cyclist
- Jakub Stehlík (born 1990), Czech ice hockey player
- Jakub Štěpánek (born 1986), Czech ice hockey player
- Jakub Stepun (born 2001), Polish sprint canoeist
- Jakub Štochl (born 1987), Czech footballer
- Jakub Stolarczyk (born 2000), Polish footballer
- Jakub Straka (born 1997), Slovak footballer
- Jakub Strnad (born 1992), Czech ice hockey player
- Jakub Strzemię (c. 1340–1409), Polish Roman Catholic archbishop
- Jakub Štvrtecký (born 1998), Czech biathlete
- Jakub Suchánek (born 1984), Czech ice hockey player
- Jakub Sucháček (born 1978), Czech ski jumper
- Jakub Suja (born 1988), Slovak ice hockey player
- Jakub Sukeľ (born 1996), Slovak ice hockey player
- Jakub Šulc (born 1985), Czech ice hockey player
- Jakub Šural (born 1996), Czech footballer
- Jakub Surovec (1715–1740), Slovak outlaw
- Jakub Švec (born 2000), Slovak footballer
- Jakub Sviták (born 1991), Czech handball player
- Jakub Svoboda (born 1989 in), Czech ice hockey player
- Jakub Świerczok (born 1992), Polish footballer
- Jakub Świnka (died 1314), Polish Catholic priest and archbishop
- Jakub Sylvestr (born 1989), Slovak footballer
- Jakub Sypek (born 2001), Polish footballer
- Jakub Szczawiński (1577–1637), nobleman in the Polish–Lithuanian Commonwealth
- Jakub Szczepaniak (born 2003), Polish footballer
- Jakub Szefer, American computer scientist and electrical engineer
- Jakub Szela (1787–1860), Polish leader of a peasant uprising in Galicia
- Jakub Szmatuła (born 1981), Polish footballer
- Jakub Szott (born 1998), Canadian football player
- Jakub Szulc (born 1973), Polish politician
- Jakub Szumski (born 1992), Polish footballer
- Jakub Szydłowiecki (ca. 1456–1509), Polish nobleman and politician
- Jakub Szymanski (born 1983), Czech handball player
- Jakub Szymański (athlete) (born 2002), Polish hurdler
- Jakub Szymański (footballer) (born 2002), Polish footballer
- Jakub Szymański (volleyball) (born 1998), Polish volleyball player
- Jakub Szynkiewicz (1884–1966), doctor of oriental studies, mufti in Poland
- Jakub Szyszko (born 2001), Polish handball player
- Jakub Szyszkowski (born 1991), Polish shot putter

=== T ===
- Jakub Tatarkiewicz (1798–1854), Polish sculptor
- Jakub Tokarz (born 1981), Polish paracanoeist
- Jakub Tomanica (born 1990), Slovak footballer
- Jakub Tomeček (born 1991), Czech sport shooter
- Jakub Tosik (born 1987), Polish footballer
- Jakub Trefný (born 1981), Czech ice hockey player
- Jakub Tronina (born 1996), Polish acrobatic gymnast
- Jakub Tyc (born 1992), Polish figure skater

=== U ===
- Jakub Uchański (1502–1581), Polish bishop
- Jakub Uhrinčať (born 2001), Slovak footballer

=== V ===
- Jakub Vadlejch (born 1990), Czech javelin thrower
- Jakub Vágner (born 1981), Czech television presenter
- Jakub Valský (born 1988), Czech ice hockey player
- Jakub Vesely (born 1986), Czech volleyball player
- Jakub Vojta (footballer) (born 1991), Czech footballer
- Jakub Vojta (ice hockey) (born 1987), Czech ice hockey player
- Jakub Vojtuš (born 1993), Slovak footballer
- Jakub Voráček (born 1989), Czech ice hockey player
- Jakub Vrzáň (born 1987), Czech slalom canoeist
- Jakub Vrána (born 1996), Czech ice hockey player
- Jakub Ignacy Waga (1800–1872), Polish botanist

=== W ===
- Jakub Wawrzyniak (born 1983), Polish football pundit and former player
- Jakub Wawszczyk (born 1998), Polish footballer
- Jakub Weinles (1870–1938), Polish painter
- Jakub Wejher (1609–1657), Polish nobleman
- Jakub Wesołowski (born 1985), Polish actor
- Jakub Wierzchowski (born 1977), Polish footballer
- Jakub Wilk (born 1985), Polish footballer
- Jakub Więzik (born 1991), Polish footballer
- Jakub Wolny (born 1995), Polish ski jumper
- Jakub Wrąbel (born 1996), Polish footballer
- Jakub Wróbel (born 1993), Polish footballer
- Jakub Wujek (1541–1597), Polish Jesuit, religious writer,
- Jakub Wygodzki (1856–1941), Polish–Lithuanian Jewish politician
- Jakub Wójcicki (born 1988), Polish footballer
- Jakub Węgrzynkiewicz (1928–006), Polish ski jumper

=== Y ===
- Jakub Yunis (born 1996), Czech-Iraqi footballer

=== Z ===
- Jakub Zabłocki (1984–2015), Polish footballer
- Jakub Zadzik (1582–1642), Polish nobleman and bishop
- Jakub Záhlava (born 1980), Czech-German tennis player
- Jakub Zbořil (born 1997), Czech ice hockey
- Jakub Žďánský (born 1986), Czech futsal player
- Jakub Zdrójkowski (born 2000), Polish television, film, and voice actor
- Jakub Zejglic (born 1990), Polish footballer
- Jakub Ziobrowski (born 1997), Polish volleyball player
- Jakub of Żnin (died 1148), archbishop of Gniezno in Poland
- Jakub Żubrowski (born 1992), Polish footballer
- Jakub Żulczyk (born 1983), Polish writer and journalist

== See also ==
- Jakub Haberfeld, Polish alcohol factory
- Jakub Wędrowycz, fictional character, protagonist of a number of short stories by Andrzej Pilipiuk
- Jakub a Terezka, Czech adventure video game
- Jokūbas, Lithuanian version of the name
