= Jakubková =

Jakubková is a Czech and Slovak feminine surname. It may be the feminine form of the following surnames:

- Jakubek
- Jakubko
