= Stehlík =

Stehlík (feminine: Stehlíková) is a Czech and Slovak surname, meaning 'European goldfinch'. Notable people with the surname include:

- Džamila Stehlíková (born 1962), Kazakh-Czech politician
- Eduard Stehlík, (born 1965), Czech historian and writer
- Henrik Stehlik (born 1980), German athlete
- Jakub Stehlík (born 1990), Czech ice hockey player
- Jan Stehlík (basketball) (born 1986), Czech basketball player
- Jan Stehlík (handballer) (born 1985), Czech handball player
- Josef Stehlík (1915–1991), Czech fighter pilot
- Petr Stehlík (born 1977), Czech shot putter
- Richard Stehlík (born 1984), Slovak ice hockey player
