= Slovakia national under-19 football team =

National association football team

Slovakia U-19
- Association: Slovenský futbalový zväz
- Confederation: UEFA (Europe)
- Head coach: Albert Rusnák
- FIFA code: SVK
First colours	Second colours

European Championship
- Appearances: 2 (first in 2002)
- Best result: Third place (bronze) (2002)

The Slovakia national under-19 football team represents the Slovak Football Association in international matches at under 19 level and is considered to be a feeder team for the Slovakia under-21 team.

== UEFA European Under-19 Championship ==
Year	Round	GP	W	D*	L	GS	GA
(Norway) 2002	Third place	4	3	0	1	13	7
(Liechtenstein) 2003	Elite qualification round						
(Switzerland) 2004	Elite qualification round						
(Northern Ireland) 2005	Elite qualification round						
(Poland) 2006	Elite qualification round						
(Austria) 2007	Elite qualification round						
(Czech Republic) 2008	Elite qualification round						
(Ukraine) 2009	Elite qualification round						
(France) 2010	Elite qualification round						
(Romania) 2011	Elite qualification round						
(Estonia) 2012	Qualification round						
(Lithuania) 2013	Elite qualification round						
(Hungary) 2014	Qualification round						
(Greece) 2015	Elite qualification round						
(Germany) 2016	Elite qualification round						
(Georgia (country)) 2017	Elite qualification round						
(Finland) 2018	Elite qualification round						
(Armenia) 2019	Qualification round						
(Northern Ireland) ~~2020~~	Cancelled due to the COVID-19 pandemic						
(Romania) ~~2021~~	Cancelled due to the COVID-19 pandemic						
(Slovakia) 2022	Group stage (U-20 WC playoff)	4	2	0	2	2	6
(Malta) 2023	Elite qualification round						
(Northern Ireland) 2024	Qualification round						
Total	2/21	8	5	0	3	15	13

== Fixtures and results ==
Below shows the results of all international matches of this team played within the last 12 months, as well as any future matches that have been scheduled.

=== 2021 ===
4 August 2021 International Friendly	Hungary	3–0	Slovakia	Győr, Hungary
17:00	Szendrei 20'; Biben 65'; Redzic 78'	Report		Stadium: ETO Park; Referee: Márió Görög (Hungary)

2 September 2021 Slovenia Nations Cup 2021	Saudi Arabia	1–2	Slovakia	Ljubljana, Slovenia
16:30	Al Nemer 29' (pen.)	Report	10' Hollý; 75' Jambor	Stadium: Ljubljana Sports Park

4 September 2021 Slovenia Nations Cup 2021	France	1–1	Slovakia	Zaprešić, Croatia
17:00	Abline 46'	Report	64' Jambor	Stadium: Ivan Laljak-Ivić Stadium

7 September 2021 Slovenia Nations Cup 2021	North Macedonia	1–1	Slovakia	Zaprešić, Croatia
12:00	Feta 17'	Report	20' Sliacky	Stadium: Ivan Laljak-Ivić Stadium

6 October 2021 UEFA Friendly Tournament	Slovakia	1–6	Germany	Žiar nad Hronom, Slovakia
18:00	Mišovič 51'	Report	26' Baah; 41' Wagner; 60' Castrop; 63' Günther; 63' Sieb; 90+3' Kraft	Stadium: Mestský štadión Referee: Manfredas Lukjančukas (Lithuania)

9 October 2021 UEFA Friendly Tournament	Slovakia	2–1	Netherlands	Žiar nad Hronom, Slovakia
19:00	Gajdoš 75'; Urgela 89'	Report	25' Rijks	Stadium: Mestský štadión Referee: Lukas Fähndrich (Switzerland)

12 October 2021 UEFA Friendly Tournament	Slovakia	1–0	Portugal	Žiar nad Hronom, Slovakia
18:00	Gajdoš 87'	Report		Stadium: Mestský štadión Attendance: 565; Referee: Manfredas Lukjančukas (Lithuania)

11 November 2021 International friendly	Czech Republic	2–1	Slovakia	Marbella, Spain
16:00	Drozd 23' (pen.); Uriča 86'	Report	77' (pen.) Jambor	Stadium: Football Training Center

13 November 2021 International friendly	Norway	1–1	Slovakia	Marbella, Spain
15:30	Gulliksen 7' (pen.)	Report	86' Jambor	Stadium: Football Training Center

=== 2022 ===
24 March 2022 International friendly	Egypt	0–1	Slovakia	Ismailia, Egypt
15:00		Report	43' Jambor	Stadium: Ismailia Stadium

28 March 2022 International friendly	Egypt	2–2	Slovakia	Ismailia, Egypt
16:00	Basha 4'; El Rakhawy 90+3'	Report	33' Jambor; 77' Gajdoš	Stadium: Ismailia Stadium

18 June 2022 2022 UEFA U19 EURO; Group A	Slovakia	0–5	France	Trnava, Slovakia
17:30		Report	16' Tchaouna; 34', 59' Bonny; 57', 62' Virginius	Stadium: Štadión Antona Malatinského; Attendance: 5,238; Referee: Morten Krogh (Denmark)

21 June 2022 2022 UEFA U19 EURO; Group A	Slovakia	0–1	Italy	Trnava, Slovakia
17:30		Report	33' Ambrosino	Stadium: Štadión Antona Malatinského; Attendance: 5,238; Referee: Goga Kikacheishvili (Georgia)

24 June 2022 2022 UEFA U19 EURO; Group A	Romania	0–1	Slovakia	Trnava, Slovakia
17:30		Report	90+5' Griger	Stadium: Štadión Antona Malatinského; Attendance: 3,485; Referee: Manfredas Lukjančukas (Lithuania)

28 June 2022 2022 UEFA U19 EURO; World Cup play-off	Slovakia	1–0	Austria	Trnava, Slovakia
17:00	Kopásek 64'	Report	(yellow card) 20' (yellow-red card) 45+3' Florian Wustinger; (yellow card) 60' (yellow-red card) 90+5' Yusuf Demir; (yellow card) 86' (yellow-red card) 90+9' Lukas Wallner	Stadium: Štadión Antona Malatinského; Attendance: 4,087; Referee: Nathan Verboomen (Belgium)

23 August 2022 International friendly	Hungary	0–1	Slovakia
		Report

25 August 2022 International friendly	Slovakia	1–0	Hungary
		Report

21 September 2022 2023 U19 European Championship qualification	Belarus	1–1	Slovakia
		Report

24 September 2022 2023 U19 European Championship qualification	Armenia	0–2	Slovakia
		Report

27 September 2022 2023 U19 European Championship qualification	Germany	1–0	Slovakia
		Report

== Players ==
=== Current Squad ===
The following players were called up for the 2027 UEFA European Under-19 Championship qualification matches against San Marino, Latvia, and Belarus on 15, 18, and 21 May 2026.

No.	Pos.	Player	Date of birth (age)	Club
1	GK	Sebastián Zajac	31 October 2007 (age 19)	(Football Association of the Czech Republic) Sparta Prague
12	GK	Dávid Kalanin	17 May 2008 (age 18)	(Slovak Football Association) FC ViOn
	GK	Adrián Malovec	8 November 2007 (age 19)	(Football Association of the Czech Republic) Olomouc
19	DF	Lukas Pristach	19 May 2007 (age 19)	(Slovak Football Association) Spartak Trnava
2	DF	Alex Lajčiak	17 December 2007 (age 18)	(Slovak Football Association) Podbrezová
	DF	Marco Bortoli	5 January 2007 (age 19)	(Slovak Football Association) Žilina
	DF	Jakub Majer	11 January 2007 (age 19)	(Slovak Football Association) Dunajská Streda
	DF	Daniel Žiška	9 October 2007 (age 19)	(Slovak Football Association) Trenčín
16	DF	Dominik Balog	4 April 2007 (age 19)	(Slovak Football Association) Slovan Bratislava
5	DF	Martin Turanský	3 June 2007 (age 19)	(Slovak Football Association) Dynamo Malženice
6	MF	Kristian Pavol Stručka	1 April 2007 (age 19)	(Slovak Football Association) Dynamo Malženice
	MF	Filip Slovak	26 May 2007 (age 19)	(Slovak Football Association) Trenčín
18	MF	Nathan Udvaros	17 September 2007 (age 19)	(Slovak Football Association) Dunajská Streda
	MF	Karol Blaško	31 March 2007 (age 19)	(Slovak Football Association) Dunajská Streda
15	MF	Martin Bačík	7 March 2007 (age 19)	(Slovak Football Association) Ružomberok
10	MF	Šimon Vlna	11 April 2007 (age 19)	(Football Association of the Czech Republic) Baník Ostrava
11	MF	Filip Trello	28 January 2007 (age 19)	(Slovak Football Association) Dynamo Malženice
14	MF	Samuel Kováčik	28 May 2007 (age 19)	(Polish Football Association) Legia Warsaw
17	FW	Patrik Baleja	23 July 2007 (age 19)	(Slovak Football Association) Žilina
16	FW	Adam Žulevič	14 September 2007 (age 19)	(Hellenic Football Federation) Iraklis
9	FW	Dávid Bukovský	27 August 2007 (age 19)	(Slovak Football Association) Dynamo Malženice

== See also ==
- Slovakia national football team
- Slovakia national under-21 football team
- Slovakia national under-18 football team
- Slovakia national under-17 football team
- Slovakia national under-16 football team
