= Rybárik =

Rybárik (feminine: Rybáriková) is a Slovak surname. It may be derived from the occupation/surname Rybár literally meaning "fisher" or "fisherman". The word may also literally mean "kingfisher". Notable people with this surname include:

- Jakub Rybárik (born 1986), Slovak actor
- Magdaléna Rybáriková (born 1988), Slovak tennis player
