= Czech Boys Choir =

The Czech Boys Choir
- Also known as: Český chlapecký sbor, Hradec Králové
- Origin: Hradec Králové, Czech Republic
- Years active: 2010-present
- Members: Jakub Martinec, Lukáš Jindřich
- Website: www.czechboyschoir.com

The Czech Boys Choir from the town of Hradec Králové in East Bohemia, maintains the famous traditions of boychoir singing in the Czech territory as it began in the 13th century with the first boys’ choir at the St. Vitus Cathedral in Prague. Founding artistic director, Jakub Martinec, began singing as a child with the first boys’ choir established in the region by Jiri and Kveta Skopal in 1982.

== Bio ==
The Czech Boys Choir organization provides artistic training for boys from the age of three to adult, and consists of the professional touring SATB concert choir, the Young Men's Ensemble and the training choir Zpěváček.

The choir regularly records for TV and radio, performs concerts in the Czech Republic and abroad, collaborates with renowned artists, ensembles and orchestras. Their repertoire includes both traditional and modern works of both Czech and international composers from all musical periods, large choral works, chamber music, folk songs and traditionals, contemporary music or choral arrangements of popular songs. The Czech Boys Choir is recognized for its stable sound quality created by uniform voice training. The young musical ambassadors of the Czech Republic enjoy singing and bringing joy to the audiences around the whole world.

== Conductors and Pianists ==
Artistic Advisor, former Conductor and Founding Artistic Director is Jakub Martinec, new conductor for season 2013/2014 is Lukáš Jindřich. Training choir Zpevacek leads choirmaster Simona Hlavata. The concert choir closely cooperates with pianist Martin Fišl.

== Gallery ==
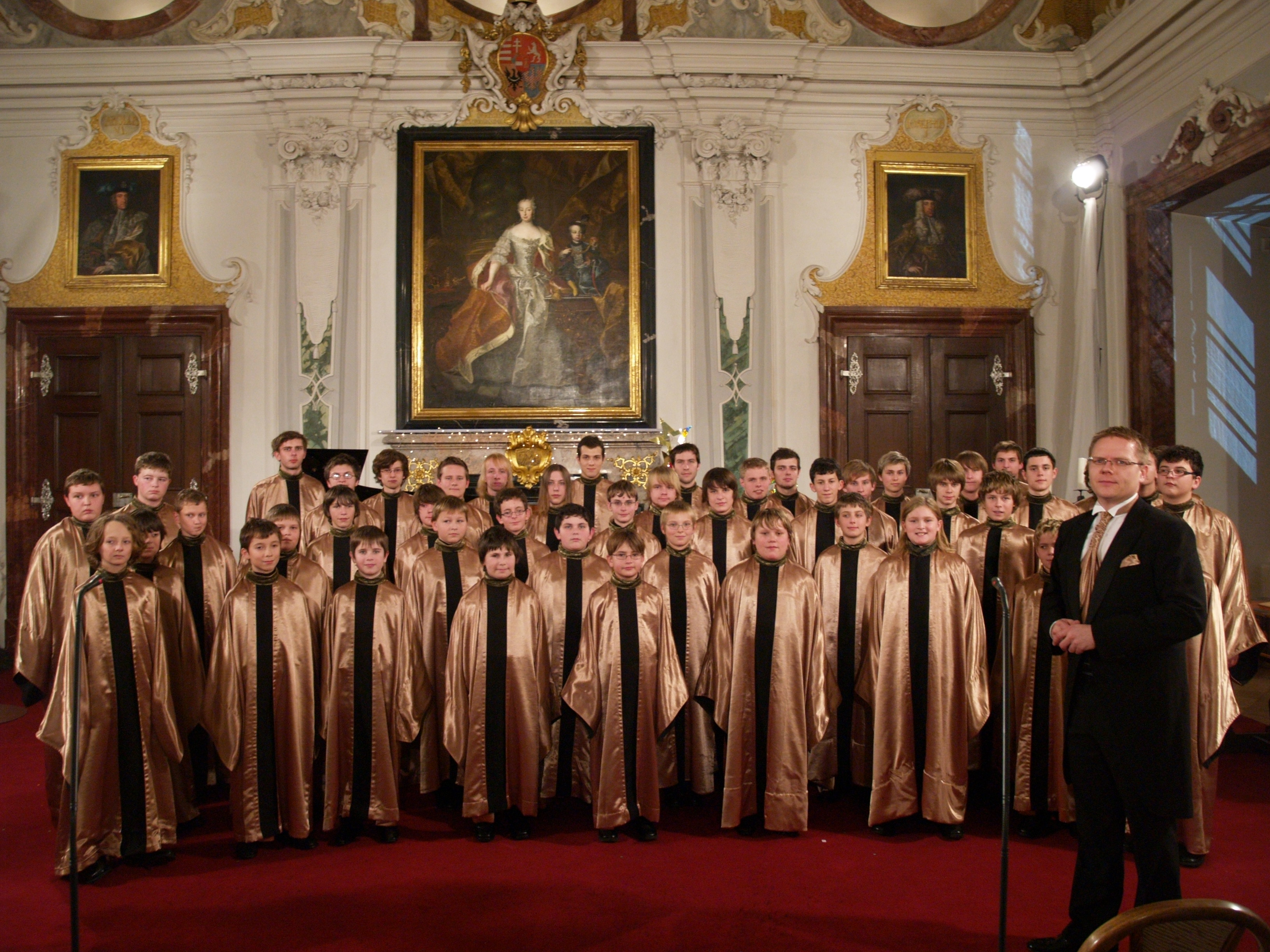
The Czech Boys Choir with Jakub Martinec (2010)

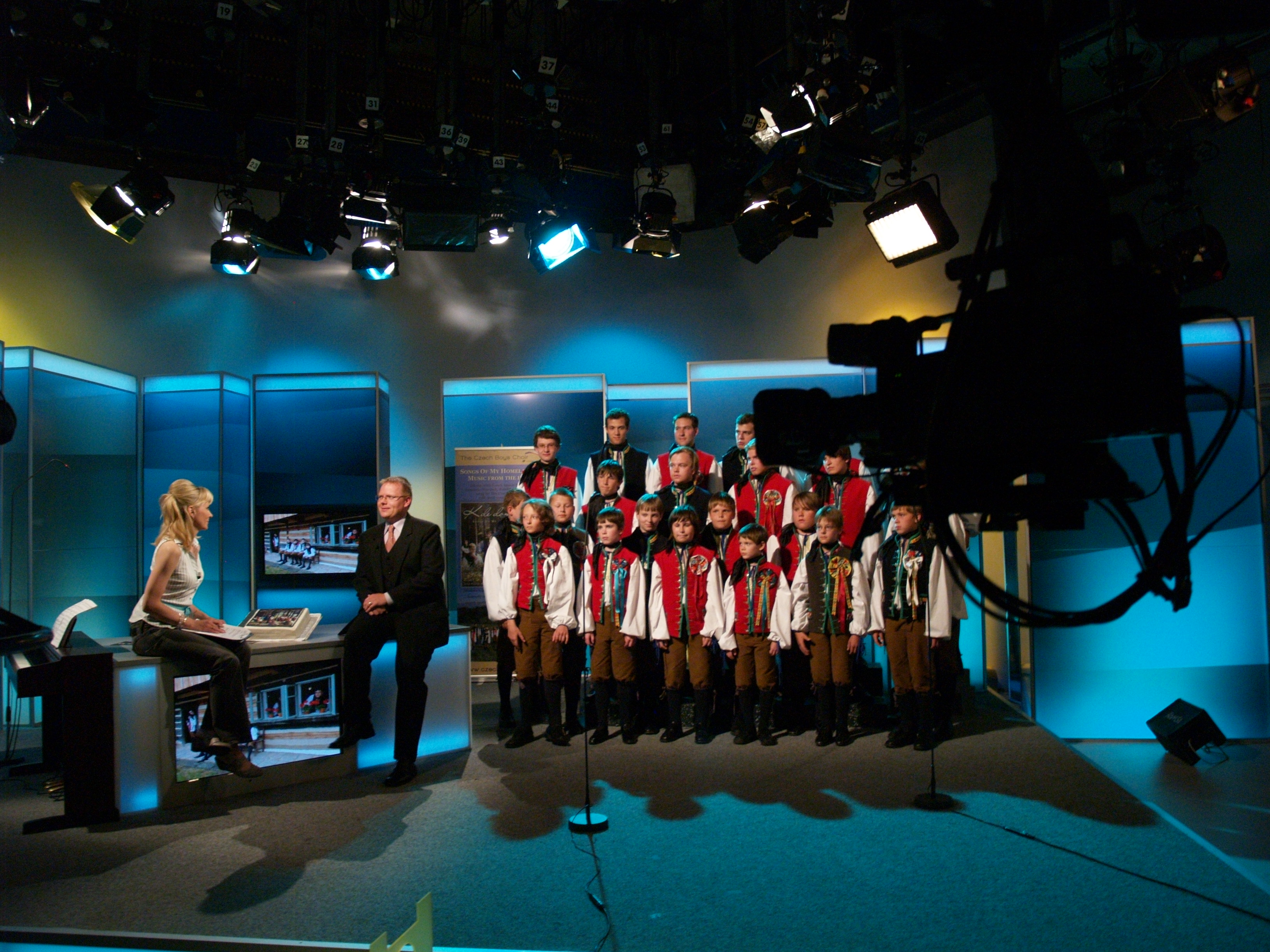
The Czech Boys Choir in the Czech TV (2011)
