= Jakubko =

Jakubko (feminine: Jakubková) is a Slovak surname, which is a diminutive of the given name Jakub. Notable people with the surname include:

- Jakub Jakubko, Slovak footballer
- Martin Jakubko (born 1980), Slovak footballer

== See also ==
- Jakubec, Jakoubek, Jakubek
