= 6th Lithuanian Vanguard Regiment =

- Active: 1776-1795
- Country: Grand Duchy of Lithuania
- Type: Cavalry
- Garrison/HQ: Kobryn & Lomna (1792 Dec)
- Engagements: Kościuszko Uprising: Vilnius uprising (1794)

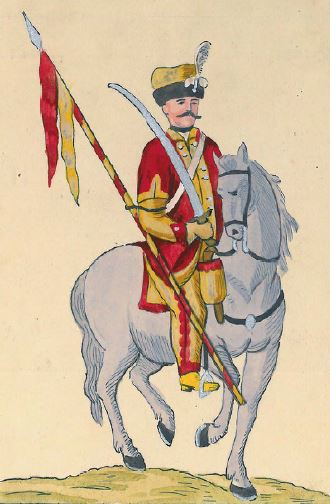
Soldier of the regiment

The 6th Lithuanian Vanguard Regiment (Polish: 6 Pułk Litewski Przedniej Straży) was a military unit of the Grand Duchy of Lithuania. It was also named:

- Tartar Regiment of Jakub Azulewicz, King's Militia
- 2nd Regt of Ułan's Court (Polish: 2 Pułk Ułany Nadwornych),

== History ==
=== Great Sejm 1788-1792 ===
The regiment was stationed in Kobryn & Lomna (1792 Dec).

=== Kościuszko Uprising ===
The regiment fought in the Battle of Vilnius.
