= Bogna Janke =

Polish politician (born 1973)

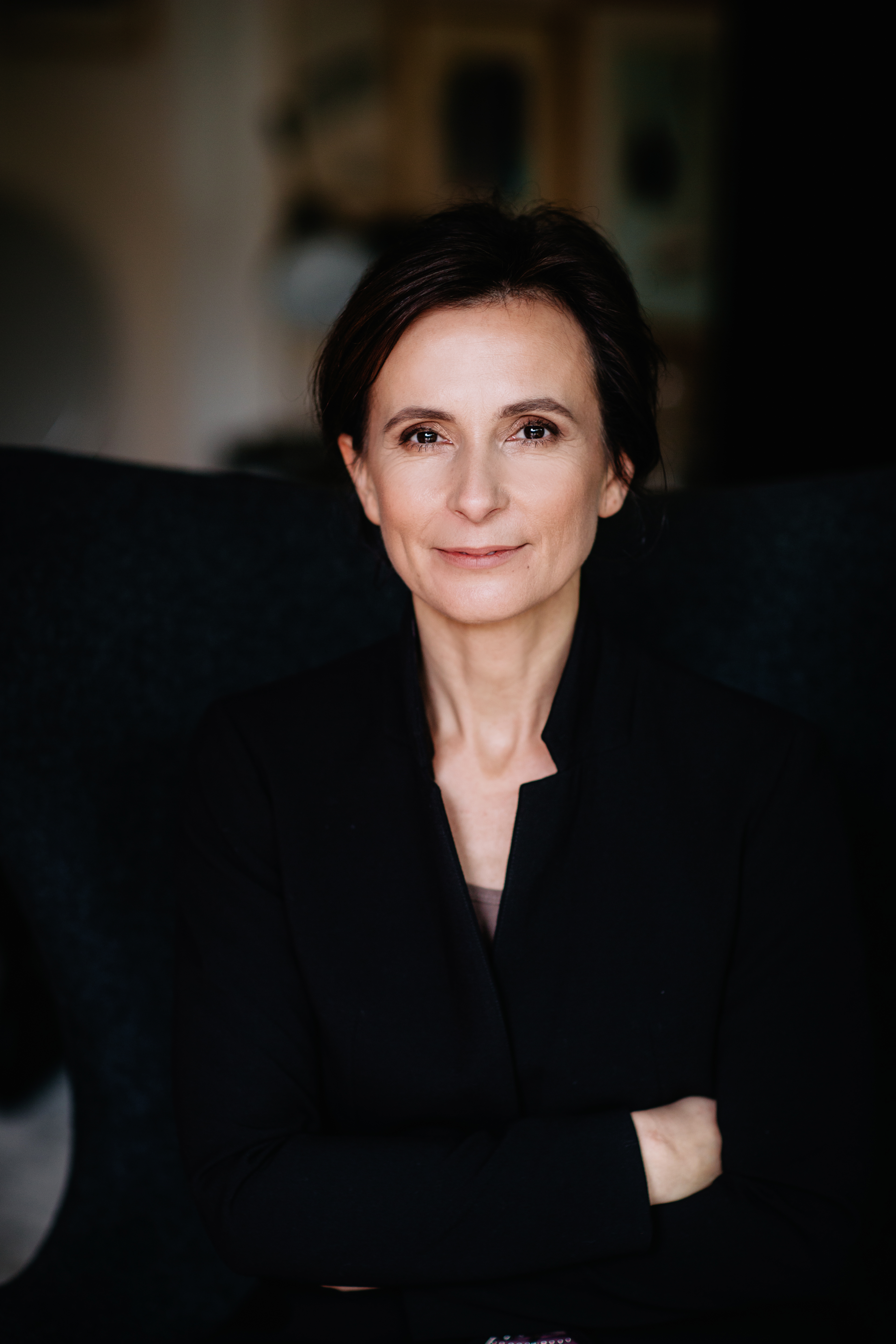
- Bogna Janke (2018)

Poland Ambassador to Brazil
- In office October 2023 – July 2024
- Succeeded by: Jakub Skiba

Personal details
- Born: 9 July 1973 (age 53) Białystok
- Spouse: Igor Janke
- Education: University of Warsaw
- Profession: journalist, politician

Bogna Joanna Janke (born 9 July 1973 in Białystok) is a Polish journalist and politician, Secretary of State at the Chancellery of the President of the Republic of Poland (2021–2022), ambassador of Poland to Brazil (2023–2024).

== Life ==
Janke grew up in Olsztyn. In 1997, she finished German studies at the University of Warsaw. She graduated from doctoral studies, as well. In 2023, she completed postgraduate studies of foreign service at the Warsaw School of Economics.

She began her professional career at the Telewizja Polska, Polish public service broadcaster. In 1998, she joined foreign affairs section of the Polish Press Agency. Between 2001 and 2003, she was a publisher of the local newspaper "Gazeta Południowa". From 2004 to 2006, she was editor of the TVN24 news channel. In 2006, she co-founded with her husband Igor Janke blog portal salon24.pl, of which she has been president and co-owner until 2021. She was a volunteer with the Fundacja Świętego Mikołaja (The Saint Nicholas Foundation). In 2012, she founded Warsaw Field Hospitals Foundation (Fundacja Warszawskie Szpitale Polowe). She has been its president until 2021 whose aim was to create an exhibition commemorating field hospitals from the Warsaw Uprising.

On 13 July 2021, she took the post of the Secretary of State at the Chancellery of the President of the Republic of Poland Andrzej Duda. She was responsible for the social dialogue. She was also member of the President's National Development Council. She finished her term on 30 June 2022. Next, she was columnist of the "Rzeczpospolita" daily and Onet.pl.

On 8 September 2023, she was appointed Poland ambassador to Brazil. She began her term in October 2023 and ended in July 2024.

== Private life ==
Janke lives in Konstancin-Jeziorna. Married to journalist Igor Janke, mother of two sons.
