= Kunín =

- Municipality
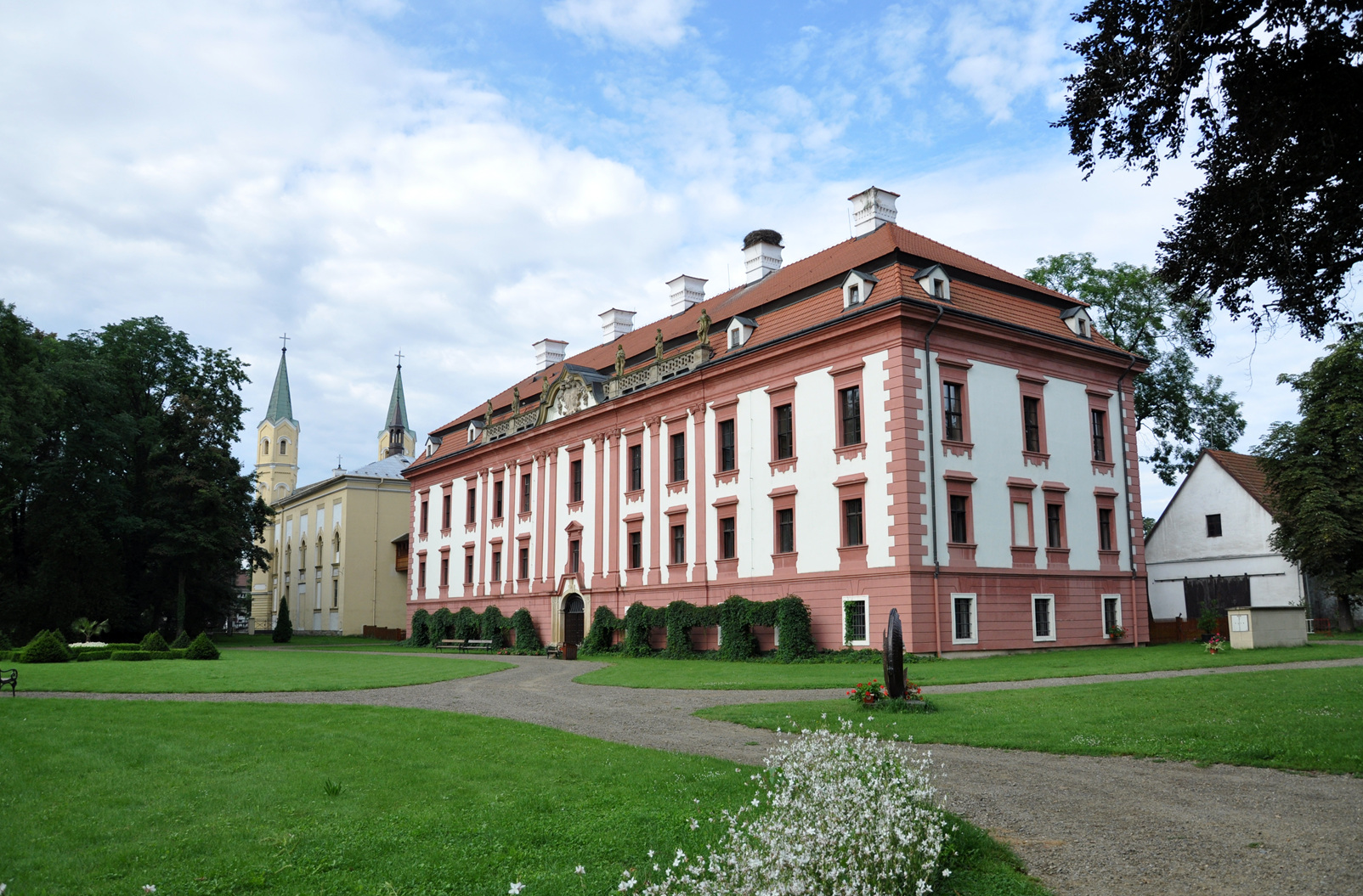
- Kunín Castle with the Church of the Exaltation of the Holy Cross

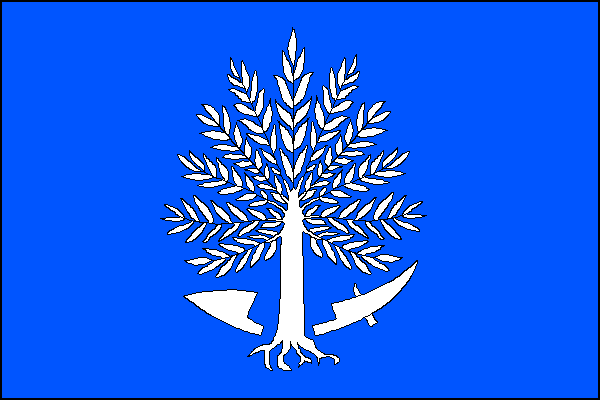
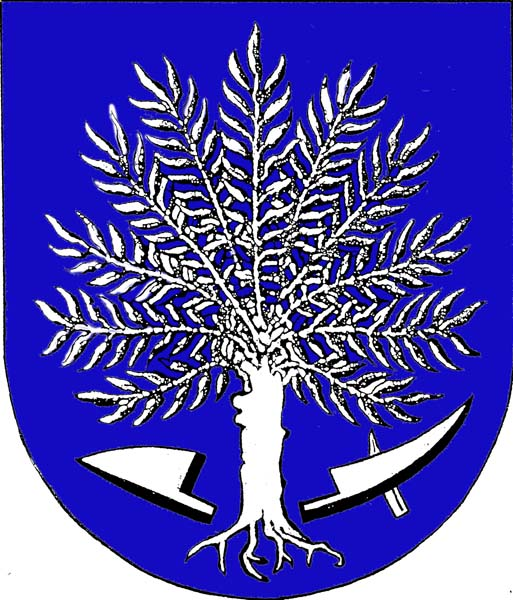
- Flag Coat of arms

- Location in the Czech Republic
- Coordinates: 49°38′2″N 17°59′23″E
- Country: Czech Republic
- Region: Moravian-Silesian
- District: Nový Jičín
- First mentioned: 1382

Area
  - Total: 17.12 km^{2} (6.61 sq mi)
- Elevation: 254 m (833 ft)

Population (2026-01-01)
  - Total: 1,795
  - Density: 104.8/km^{2} (271.6/sq mi)
- Time zone: UTC+1 (CET)
  - Summer (DST): UTC+2 (CEST)
- Postal code: 742 53
- Website: www.kunin.cz

Kunín (until 1947 Kunvald; German: Kunewald) is a municipality and village in Nový Jičín District in the Moravian-Silesian Region of the Czech Republic. It has about 1,800 inhabitants.

== Geography ==
Kunín is located about 4 kilometres (2 mi) north of Nový Jičín and 27 km (17 mi) southwest of Ostrava. The larger part of the municipality lies in the Moravian Gate, only the southeastern part lies in the Moravian-Silesian Foothills. The Jičínka River flows through the municipality. The northern and western parts of the municipal territory lie within the Poodří Protected Landscape Area.

== History ==
The first written mention of Kunvald is from 1382. From 1584, it was a separate estate. In 1947, Kunvald was renamed Kunín. From 1975 to 1990, Kunín was a municipal part of Nový Jičín. Since 1991, it has been a separate municipality.

== Demographics ==
Historical population

Year	Pop.	±%
1869	1,954	—
1880	2,105	+7.7%
1890	2,159	+2.6%
1900	2,116	−2.0%
1910	2,154	+1.8%

Year	Pop.	±%
1921	1,931	−10.4%
1930	2,016	+4.4%
1950	1,358	−32.6%
1961	1,553	+14.4%
1970	1,596	+2.8%

Year	Pop.	±%
1980	1,721	+7.8%
1991	1,796	+4.4%
2001	1,858	+3.5%
2011	1,836	−1.2%
2021	1,811	−1.4%

Source: Censuses

== Economy ==
The municipality is connected with a significant dairy company Mlékárna Kunín. The production started here at the end of the 19th century. In 2004, the production was moved to Ostrava while the headquarters stayed here. Since 2007, the company is owned by Lactalis corporation.

== Transport ==
The I/57 road (the section from Nový Jičín to Opava) runs through the municipality.

== Sights ==
The most important monument is the Kunín Castle. It was built in the Baroque style in 1726–1734. It was built according to the design by Johann Lukas von Hildebrandt for the Counts of Harrach. Today the castle houses the town museum. Next to the castle is an English park.

The Church of the Holy Cross was built in the Empire style in 1810–1811. A statue of St. John of Nepomuk stands in front of the church.

== Notable people ==
- Jakub Kunvaldský (1528–1578), clergyman, educator and composer
- Anna Nitschmann (1715–1760), poet and Moravian Church missionary

== Twin towns – sister cities ==
Kunín is twinned with:

- Leimen, Germany
