= Jakubec =

Jakubec (feminine Jakubcová) is a Czech and Slovak surname that may refer to the following notable people:

- Branislav Jakubec (born 1967), Slovak wheelchair curler
- Doris Jakubec, professor of Suisse romande literature
- František Jakubec (1956–2016), Czech football player
- Ivana Jakubcová (born 1994), Slovak basketball player

== See also ==
- Jakoubek, Jakubek, Jakubko
