= Jakubek =

Jakúbek or Jakubek (feminine: Jakúbková/Jakubková) is a Czech and Slovak surname, which is a diminutive of the given name Jakub. Notable people with the surname include:

- Dominik Jakubek (born 1979), American soccer player
- Matej Jakúbek, Slovak footballer
- Michal Jakubek, Slovak footballer

== See also ==
- Jakubec, Jakoubek, Jakubko
