= Jakub Apolinarski =

Polish footballer

Personal information
- Full name: Jakub Apolinarski
- Date of birth: 4 May 1999 (age 27)
- Place of birth: Leszno, Poland
- Height: 1.76 m (5 ft 9 in)
- Position: Right winger

Team information
- Current team: Warta Poznań
- Number: 7

Youth career
- –2014: Polonia Leszno
- 2014–2018: Warta Poznań

Senior career*
Years	Team	Apps	(Gls)
2018	Polonia Środa Wielkopolska	17	(6)
2019–2022	Raków Częstochowa	5	(0)
2020	→ Warta Poznań (loan)	13	(1)
2020–2021	→ GKS Jastrzębie (loan)	25	(1)
2022–2025	Pogoń Grodzisk Mazowiecki	107	(14)
2025–2026	Polonia Bytom	28	(1)
2026–	Warta Poznań	0	(0)

International career
2019	Poland U20	2	(0)
- * Club domestic league appearances and goals as of 08:48, 27 May 2026 (UTC)

Jakub Apolinarski (born 4 May 1999) is a Polish professional footballer who plays as a right winger for I liga club Warta Poznań.

== Club career ==
In 2019, Apolinarski signed for Raków Częstochowa.

On 23 September 2020, he joined GKS Jastrzębie on a season-long loan.

== Career statistics ==
As of match played 4 May 2026

Appearances and goals by club, season and competition
Club	Season	League			Polish Cup		Europe		Other		Total	
Club	Season	Division	Apps	Goals	Apps	Goals	Apps	Goals	Apps	Goals	Apps	Goals
Polonia Środa Wielkopolska	2018–19	III liga, group II	17	6	2	1	—		—		19	7
Raków Częstochowa	2018–19	I liga	0	0	0	0	—		—		0	0
Raków Częstochowa	2019–20	Ekstraklasa	5	0	0	0	—		—		5	0
Raków Częstochowa	2021–22	Ekstraklasa	0	0	0	0	0	0	0	0	0	0
Raków Częstochowa	Total		5	0	0	0	0	0	0	0	5	0
Warta Poznań (loan)	2019–20	I liga	13	1	—		—		—		13	1
GKS Jastrzębie (loan)	2020–21	I liga	25	1	1	0	—		—		26	1
Pogoń Grodzisk Mazowiecki	2021–22	II liga	13	1	—		—		—		13	1
Pogoń Grodzisk Mazowiecki	2022–23	III liga, group I	29	1	0	0	—		—		29	1
Pogoń Grodzisk Mazowiecki	2023–24	III liga, group I	32	7	—		—		—		32	7
Pogoń Grodzisk Mazowiecki	2024–25	II liga	33	5	2	0	—		—		35	5
Pogoń Grodzisk Mazowiecki	Total		107	14	2	0	—		—		109	14
Polonia Bytom	2025–26	I liga	28	1	4	0	—		—		32	1
Warta Poznań	2026–27	I liga	0	0	0	0	—		—		0	0
Career total			195	23	9	1	0	0	0	0	204	24

== Honours ==
Pogoń Grodzisk Wielkopolski

- III liga, group I: 2023–24
- Polish Cup (Masovia regionals): 2023–24
