= Jakub Szczepaniak =

Polish footballer

Personal information
- Date of birth: 20 May 2003 (age 23)
- Place of birth: Grudziądz, Poland
- Height: 1.78 m (5 ft 10 in)
- Position: Defender

Youth career
- –2020: Olimpia Grudziądz

Senior career*
Years	Team	Apps	(Gls)
2020–2022	Olimpia Grudziądz	1	(0)
2021	→ Sparta Brodnica (loan)	10	(0)
2022	Stal Grudziądz	4	(0)
- * Club domestic league appearances and goals as of 08:18, 20 May 2024 (UTC)

Jakub Szczepaniak (born 20 May 2003) is a Polish professional footballer who plays as a defender.

== Career statistics ==
=== Club ===
As of 13 June 2020.

Appearances and goals by club, season and competition
Club	Season	League			Cup		Continental		Other		Total	
Club	Season	Division	Apps	Goals	Apps	Goals	Apps	Goals	Apps	Goals	Apps	Goals
Olimpia Grudziądz	2019–20	I liga	1	0	0	0	–		0	0	1	0
Career total			1	0	0	0	0	0	0	0	1	0
