= Jakub Szefer =

American professor

Jakub Szefer is an American computer scientist and electrical engineer, currently an associate professor of Electrical and Computer Engineering at Northwestern University. Prior to joining Northwestern, Szefer was an associate professor of Electrical & Computer Engineering & Computer Science at Yale University, where he also served as the director of the Computer Architecture and Security Lab. His research focuses on securing cloud-based computing systems, including classical processors, machine learning accelerators, and quantum computing systems.

== Early life and education ==
Szefer earned a bachelor's degree from University of Illinois at Urbana-Champaign. He completed his master's and doctoral degrees in electrical engineering at Princeton University, advised by Ruby B. Lee.

== Career ==
After graduation, Szefer began his academic career at Yale University. His work addresses the security challenges in cloud computing systems and explores how the design and operation of computing hardware can affect system vulnerabilities. He is especially focused on developing solutions to counteract emerging security threats in modern computing environments.

In January 2025, Szefer joined Northwestern University McCormick School of Engineering as an associate professor in electrical and computer engineering, where he continues his research in computer architecture and hardware security.
