= Jakub Skiba =

Polish politician

Jakub Skiba Ph.D.
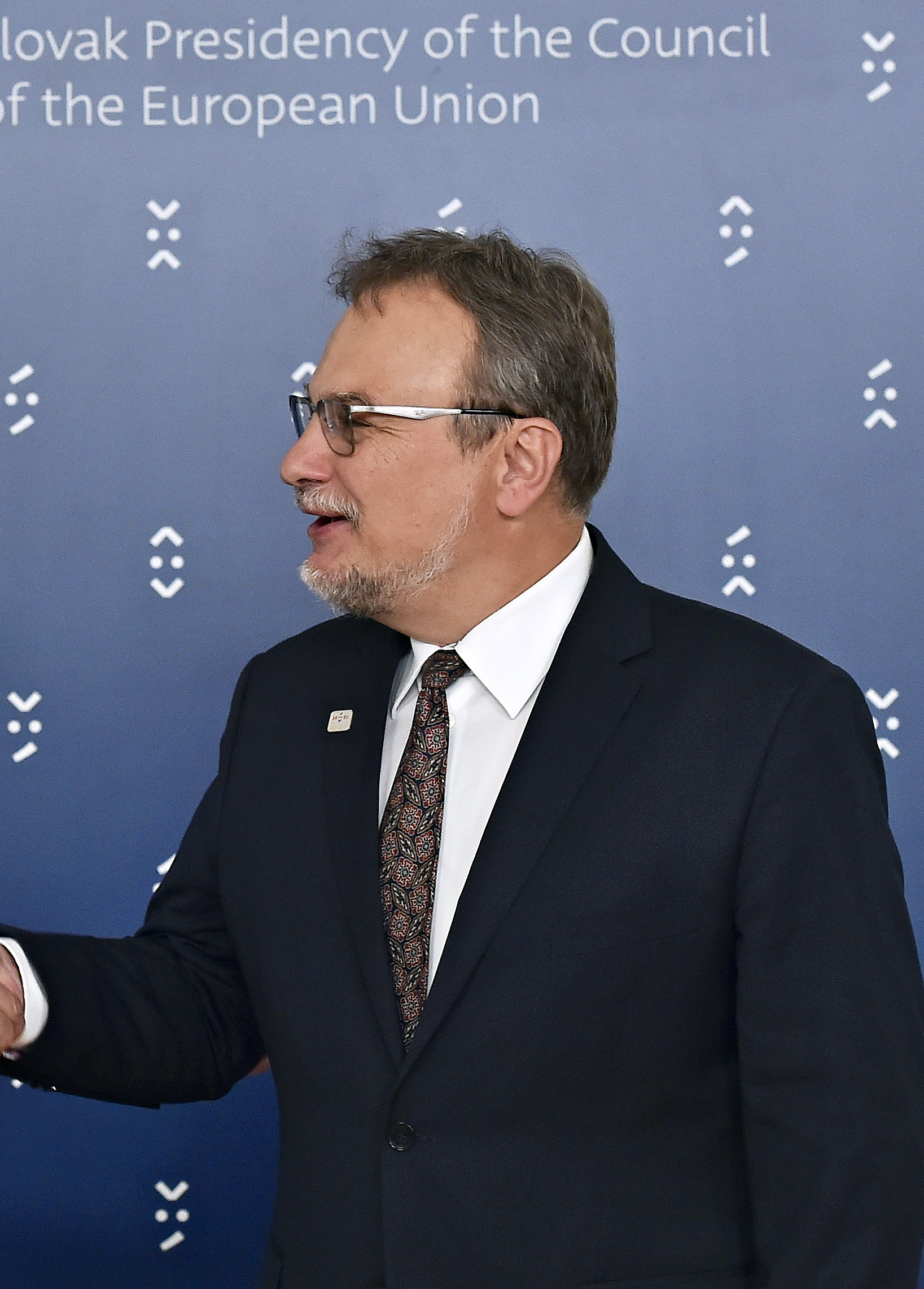

Poland Ambassador to Brazil
- In office March 2020 – 28 February 2023
- Preceded by: Andrzej Braiter
- Succeeded by: Bogna Janke

Personal details
- Born: 16 May 1961 (age 65) Kraków
- Education: John Paul II Catholic University of Lublin; National School of Public Administration
- Profession: diplomat, civil servant

Jakub Tadeusz Skiba (born 16 May 1961 in Kraków) is a Polish civil servant and diplomat who has been serving as a deputy Minister of Interior and Administration (2015–2017), ambassador of Poland to Brazil (2020–2023).

== Life ==
In 1986, Skiba graduated from history at the John Paul II Catholic University of Lublin; his Master thesis received the award of the Polish Historical Society. After the collapse of socialism in Poland, in the early 1990s, he has been engaged for a short time in the Centre Agreement political party. Finally, he chose career of the civil servant and entered the National School of Public Administration (KSAP) which he finished in 1993. In 2016, Skiba received Ph.D., defending at the Warsaw School of Economics thesis on history of Polish economy between 1936 and 1939.

He worked for the Supreme Audit Office (1993) and the Ministry of Foreign Affairs (1993–1996, 2003–2005). Between 1996 and 1997, he was posted as First Secretary at the Permanent Mission of the Republic of Poland to the United Nations in New York. From 1997 to 1999, he was director at the Chancellery of the Prime Minister of Poland, later he was director general of the Central Statistical Office. Since 2005, he has been director general at the Ministry of Interior and Administration and Chancellery of the Prime Minister. He was member of the KSAP council (2000–2007), and Council for Foreigners. In November 2007 he was appointed member of the board of the National Bank of Poland for a six-year term. On 18 November 2015, he was nominated Secretary of State of the Ministry of Interior and Administration. On 20 October 2017 he became acting president of the Polish Security Printing Works. On 8 February 2018, he took the same post at the Polish Armaments Group, within two weeks becoming regular president of the company. Between 2019 and 2020, he was director of the War Studies Academy Center for Security Studies in Warsaw. In January 2020 Skiba was appointed Poland ambassador to Brazil, presenting his letter of credence in March 2020. He ended his term on 28 February 2023.

In 2012, Skiba published a book "Itinerarium. Moja podróż w głąb Europy" (Itinerarium. My journey to the heart of Europe). Besides Polish, he speaks English, French, and has passive knowledge of Spanish and Russian.
