= Jakub M. Godzimirski =

Jakub M. Godzimirski (born 1957) is a Polish/Norwegian social anthropologist and international relations scholar. He is a Research Professor at the Norwegian Institute of International Affairs.

Godzimirski got his M.A. in social/cultural anthropology at the University of Warsaw in 1981, and defended his PhD at the Institute of Art, Polish Academy of Sciences in 1987. Since 1995 he has been employed at the Norwegian Institute of International Affairs, as a senior research fellow and research professor at the Department of Russian and Eurasian Studies (originally the Centre for Russian Studies) where he heads Energy Programme. His research focuses on Russian foreign, defence and security policy, European integration, Central and Eastern Europe, and politics of energy.
