= Jakub Maxa =

Czech ice hockey player

- Born: April 23, 1989 (age 35)
- Height: 5 ft 11 in (180 cm)
- Weight: 176 lb (80 kg; 12 st 8 lb)
- Position: Forward
- Shoots: Left
- Czech Extraliga team: HC Litvínov
- Playing career: 2008–present

Jakub Maxa (born April 23, 1989) is a Czech professional ice hockey player. He played with HC Litvínov in the Czech Extraliga during the 2010–11 Czech Extraliga season.
