= Jakub Martinec (musical artist) =

Czech musician (born 1979)

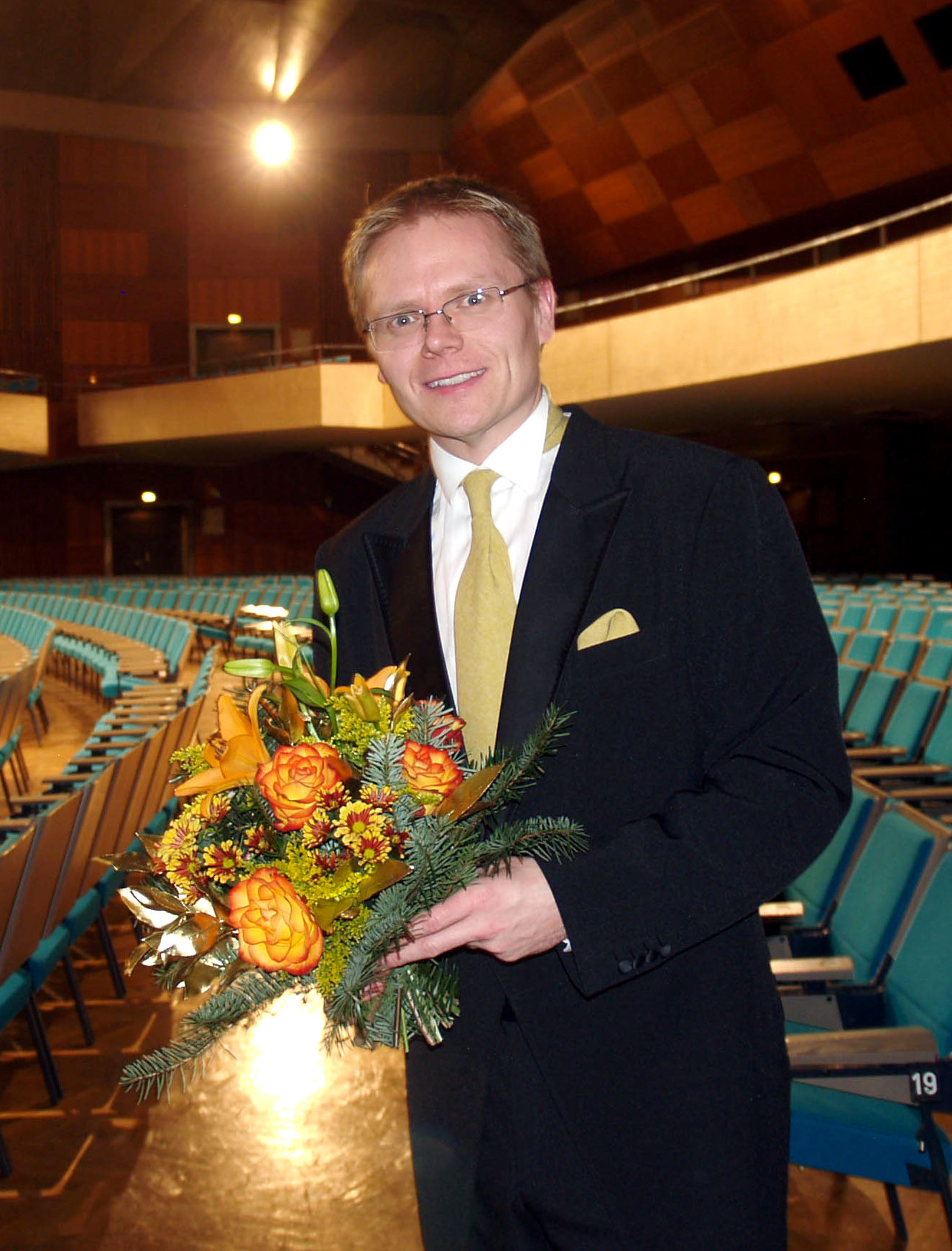
- Jakub Martinec at Meistersingerhalle in 2009
- Born: 23 May 1979 (age 46); Hradec Králové, Czechoslovakia
- Occupation(s): Professor, choirmaster, choral clinician
- Years active: 1996–present
- Organizations: Czech Boys Choir

Jakub Martinec (born 23 May 1979) is a Czech musician, conductor and choirmaster. He is a professor of choral activities at Memorial University of Newfoundland, holds a Ph.D. in music from the University of Western Ontario and Artistic Advisor, and is the former conductor and founding artistic director of the Czech Boys Choir.

== Biography ==
Martinec was born on 23 May 1979 in Hradec Králové, Czechoslovakia. His research focuses on a comparison of European and North American perspectives of choral conducting as well as investigations of early Czech choral literature, and pedagogical strategies for teaching adolescent male singers. He was the founding artistic director of the renowned Czech Boys Choir.

Martinec has recorded for national TV and radio in the Czech Republic. He has directed numerous CDs and DVDs, of which his recording of Britten's A Ceremony of Carols received a Recording of the Month award by the London-based Classical Music Web. Martinec has performed with eminent orchestras, ensembles and musical personalities in some of the world's great concert halls and cathedrals, including Meistersingerhalle, Nuremberg, Germany (2005, 2009, 2011), Grace Cathedral in San Francisco, US (2004), Winspear Hall in Edmonton, Canada (2006), Massey Hall in Toronto, Canada (2012), the Pantheon and the Basilica Santa Maria Maggiore in Rome for the leaders of the Vatican (2009, 2010), Truro Cathedral, United Kingdom (2013) and regularly at the Rudolfinum Dvořák Hall and Smetana Hall in Prague.

With his choirs, he performed the opening concert of choral cycle of the Czech Philharmonic Orchestra (2006), and has appeared at numerous international music festivals including The Prague Spring Festival (2004, 2005), AmericaFest International Festival for Boys’ & Men’ Choirs including the VIth World Choral Symposium in Minneapolis (2002), Festival d'Ambronay (2006), Mitte Europa (2008, 2009, 2013), and the highly acclaimed World Festival of Singing for Men and Boys (Prague, Hradec Kralove, 2004, 2008).

In 2020, Martinec was one of the recipients of the Top 25 Canadian Immigrant Awards of 2020.
