= Jakub Sangowski =

Polish footballer (born 2002)

Personal information
- Full name: Jakub Mateusz Sangowski
- Date of birth: 11 March 2002 (age 24)
- Place of birth: Poznań, Poland
- Height: 1.91 m (6 ft 3 in)
- Position: Striker

Team information
- Current team: Wiara Lecha Poznań

Youth career
- –2013: Warta Poznań
- 2013–2017: Lech Poznań
- 2017–2019: Zagłębie Lubin

Senior career*
Years	Team	Apps	(Gls)
2019–2020	Zagłębie Lubin II	0	(0)
2020	Lechia Gdańsk II	0	(0)
2020–2021	Zagłębie Sosnowiec	3	(0)
2021	→ Cagliari (loan)	0	(0)
2021–2024	Warta Poznań	7	(0)
2022–2023	→ Skra Częstochowa (loan)	24	(1)
2023–2024	→ Olimpia Elbląg (loan)	21	(4)
2024–2025	Sandecja Nowy Sącz	17	(1)
2025–2026	Sokół Kleczew	30	(1)
2026–	Wiara Lecha Poznań	0	(0)
- * Club domestic league appearances and goals as of 18:15, 9 June 2026 (UTC)

Jakub Sangowski (born 11 March 2002) is a Polish professional footballer who plays as a striker for V liga Greater Poland club Wiara Lecha Poznań.

== Honours ==
Sandecja Nowy Sącz

- III liga, group IV: 2024–25
- Polish Cup (Nowy Sącz regionals): 2024–25
