= Jakub Heilpern =

Polish chess player

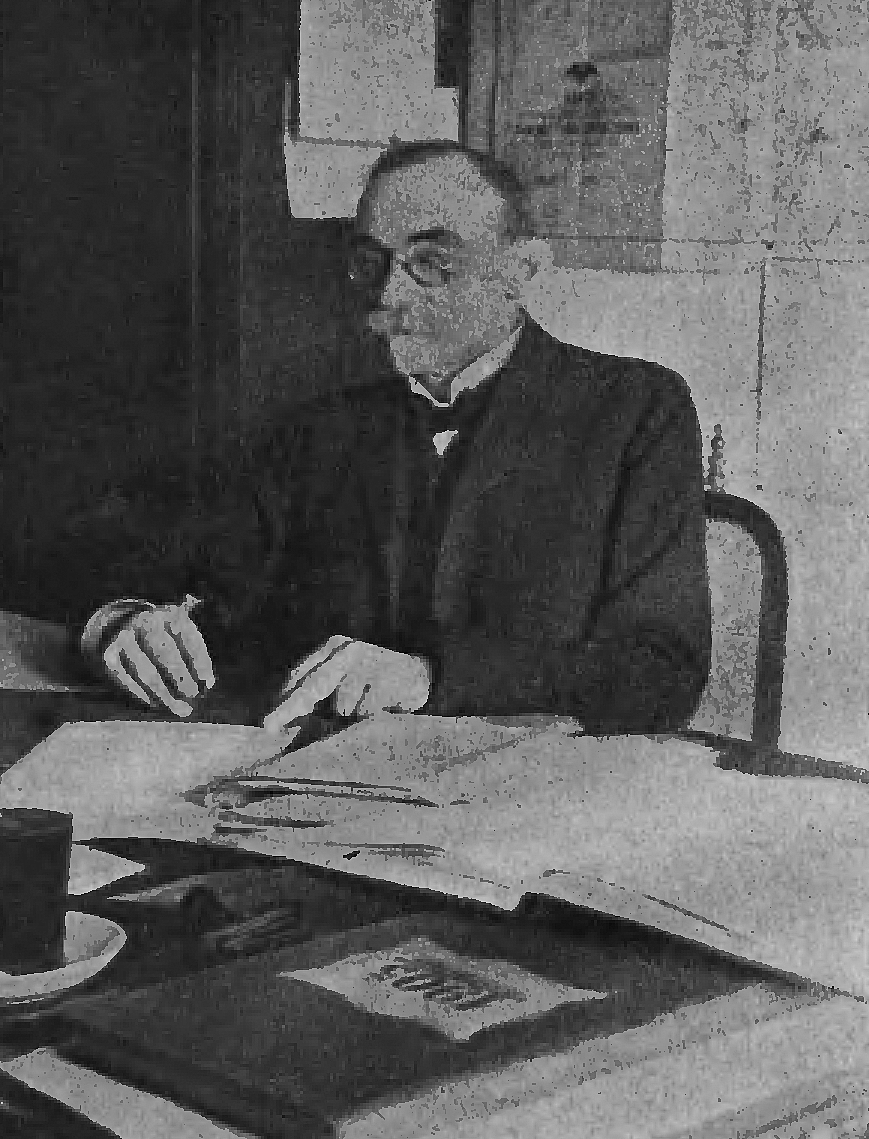

Jakub Heilpern (3 February 1850 – 28 November 1910) was a chess master from the Russian Empire.

== Biography ==
Born into a Jewish family near Warsaw, he was educated in a high school gymnasium in Warsaw, studied in ETH Zurich (Eidgenössische Polytechnische Schule) in 1870–72 and graduated from Technical University of Munich (Technische Hochschule München) in 1874. After the study, he worked in Bavaria, among others in Süddeutsche Brückenbau A.G. In 1879, he returned to Poland, and worked as an engineer at the Warsaw–Vienna Railway.

He tied for 5-6th in the 2nd Warsaw City Chess Championship (Józef Żabiński won). Heilpern won a match against Jean Taubenhaus (5.5 : 3.5) at Warsaw 1887.

Since 1902, he was a chief editor of Przegląd Techniczny (Technical Review) in Warsaw. He died in a health resort at Gardone Riviera in Italy.
