= Jakub Herman =

Czech ice hockey player

- Born: February 21, 1992 (age 33) Přerov, Czechoslovakia
- Height: 5 ft 11 in (180 cm)
- Weight: 196 lb (89 kg; 14 st 0 lb)
- Position: Left wing
- Shoots: Left
- ELH team Former teams: PSG Berani Zlín; HC Olomouc
- National team: Czech Republic
- Playing career: 2011–present

Jakub Herman (born February 21, 1992) is a Czech professional ice hockey left winger for PSG Berani Zlín of the Czech Extraliga.

== Career ==
Herman began his career as a product of HC Zlín's academy. He went to Canada to play in the junior Canadian Hockey League and wad drafted 53rd overall by the Moose Jaw Warriors of the Western Hockey League in the 2009 CHL Import Draft. He played one season in the WHL, scoring three goals and three assists in 34 games before returning to the Czech Republic.

After a season with HC Oceláři Třinec's U20 academy, Herman joined HC Olomouc of the 1st Czech National Hockey League. The team were promoted to the Czech Extraliga in 2014 and Herman went on to play 206 games for the team over the next four seasons.

On March 29, 2018, Olomouc announced that Herman would be leaving the club and on May 1, he signed for PSG Berani Zlín.
