= Jakub Haberfeld =

Polish alcohol factiories

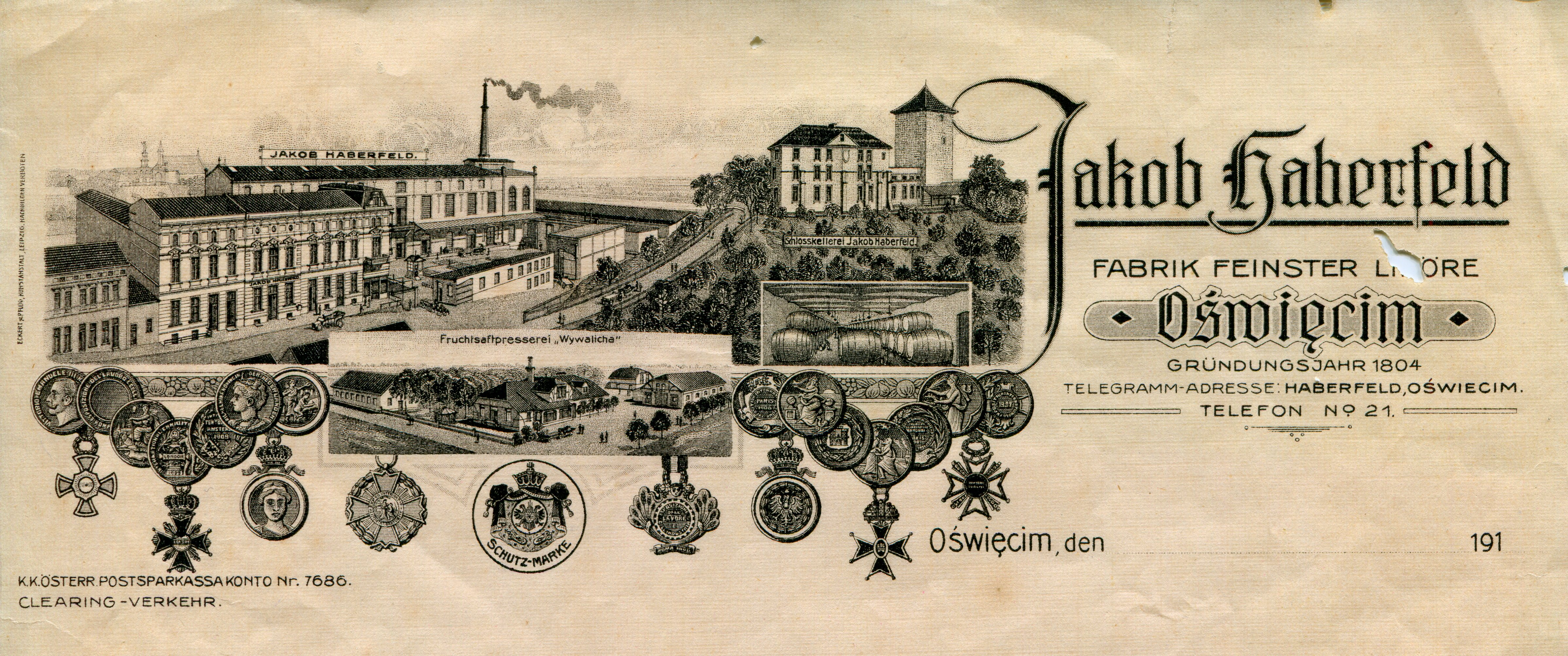
- Type: Distillery
- Founded: 1804
- Founder: Jakub Haberfeld
- Headquarters: Oświęcim, Poland
- Website: jakobhaberfeld.pl

Jakub Haberfeld (original spelling: Jakób Haberfeld or Jakob Haberfeld) – one of the oldest Polish alcohol factories, founded in 1804 in Oświęcim producing vodka and liqueurs. The company was reactivated in June 2019.

== History ==
The Haberfeld family settled in Oświęcim in the second half of the XVIIIth century. Jakub, son of Simon and Jacheta, founded in 1804 the Factory of Vodka and Liqueurs. After his death, the business was inherited by his son, also Jakub (1839–1904). In 1906, Emil Haberfeld became the new owner. The Haberfelds were a progressive Jewish family who were involved in social life; many served on the town council and participated in charity initiatives.

At the turn of the 19th and 20th centuries, the factory poured beer for the Jan Götz brewery in Okocim. From around 1906 until the end of the interwar period, it partnered with the Żywiec Brewery. At the beginning of the 20th century, the factory expanded and obtained new buildings, including spaces in the Oświęcim castle bought by the family from the city, chiefly warehouses.

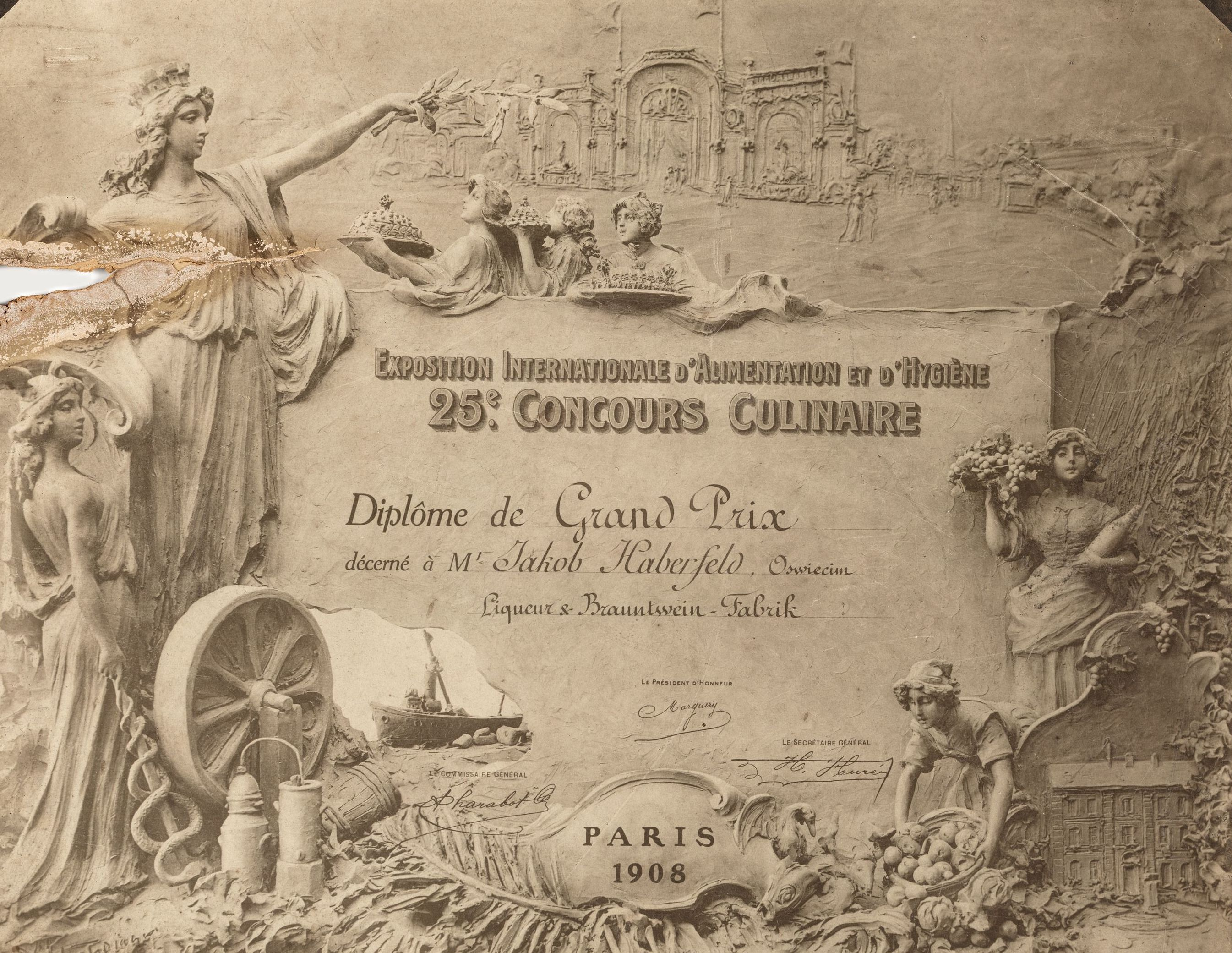
A certificate for the Jakub Haberfeld Factory given at the Paris culinary fair, 1908

In August 1939, Alfons Haberfeld and his wife Felicja participated in the 1939 New York World's Fair, presenting their products at the Polish pavilion. On the way back, at the outbreak of World War II, the ship was stopped and directed to Scotland, preventing them from returning to German-occupied Poland. Their five years old daughter Franciszka Henryka and her grandmother were murdered in 1942 by the Germans in the death camp Bełżec. Alfons and Felicja returned to the USA. In 1952, along with other Holocaust survivors, they founded an organization in Los Angeles called Club 1939. They both died in Los Angeles, Alfons in 1970, and Felicja in 2010.

After the end of hostilities in 1945, the house and factory buildings were taken over by the State Treasury. In the years 1945–1947 the factory was called "Jakub Haberfeld's Factory under state administration", and after 1947 it had been called “Oświęcimskie Zakłady Przemysłu Terenowego", " Non-alcoholic Beverage Factory and Beer Bottling Plant in Oświęcim ". After 1989, the bottling plants were declared bankrupt, and the remaining factory property was plundered. In 1992, a bricked-up cellar was discovered containing several thousand bottles ready for production.

By decision of September 25, 1995. The factory complex and the Haberfeld family house was entered in the register of monuments of the Bielsko Province. By 2003, the factory buildings and the Haberfeld family home, displaced and not renovated, fell into ruin. In 2003, it was decided to demolish the tenement house and the factory.

== Production ==
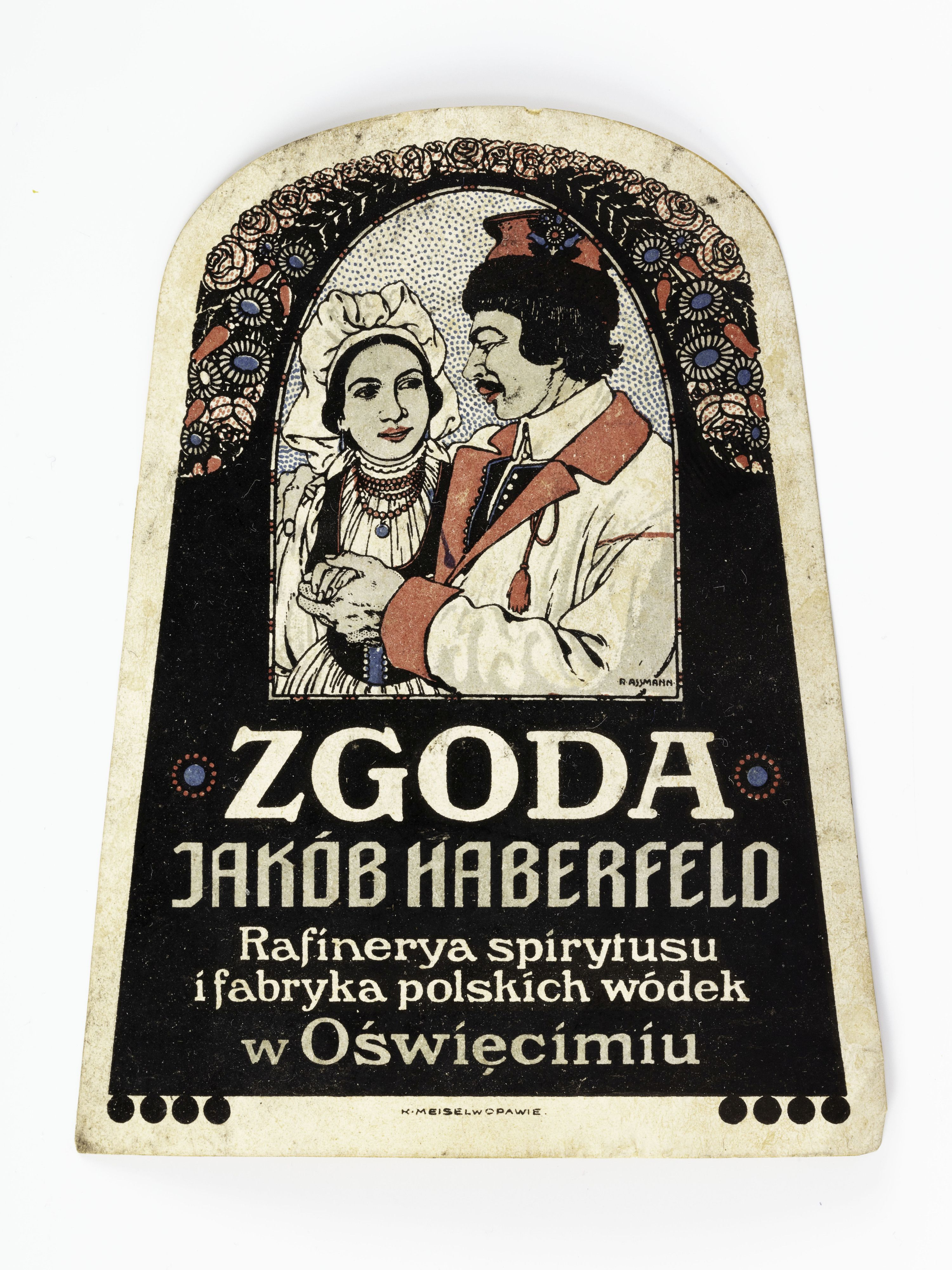
"Zgoda" liquor label

The drinks were made on the basis of natural juices. They were produced and stored in the cellars of the "Monopol" restaurant, which was located in the family house next to the factory premises. The drinks were poured into characteristic, brand and porcelain glass bottles, made to order. For the orangeade and soda water bottles, porcelain stoppers were used. All products of the factory had original labels, which were produced, among others, in Bielsko and in Opava. The factory produced several dozen types of vodkas and liqueurs in several hundred varieties. The specialties of the factory were "Magister", "Basztówka" and "Zgoda".

During World War I, the factory produced vodka for the Austrian army, which was part of the soldier's equipment. This drink was called "Kaizerschutze" (Imperial Gunner). The factory also had a warehouse and sales of products in Kęty, run by Mr. Hoffmann, and a warehouse in Krakow. Haberfeld also had many salesmen who advertised his products. For example, in Silesia it was Franciszek Kehl.

According to the industry questionnaire submitted by the owners in 1934, the factory was called "Vodka and liqueur factory and fruit juice press", it was a general partnership. The average wage of a manual worker was 750 zloty, and office worker - 2000 zloty.

The factory, apart from selling products locally, also exported them to Italy, Austria, Germany and Hungary. Haberfeld also exhibited his products at various foreign exhibitions, where he was awarded with diplomas and medals.

During the German occupation, the factory was taken over by the occupant, and a German named Handelmann became a receivership (so-called treuhänder). The Germans then used the following labels: "Haberfeld unter Verwaltung Treuhändler", and production during this period was continued on a smaller scale. All the factory property and the family house remained intact and survived the period of the Nazi occupation.

== Vodka Museum ==
On June 30, 2019, on the premises of the former Jacob Haberfeld Vodka and Liqueur Factory, the Vodka Museum was opened, commemorating the achievements of this family from Oświęcim, their contribution to the development of the liquor industry both in the region and in the country. The museum shows the history of a family that not only became famous in the world as a significant brand of vodkas and liqueurs, but also outstanding figures for the city. Few people know that Alfons Haberfeld was the only Oświęcim shareholder of the first Polish car factory "Oświęcim-Praga", which was used by such celebrities as Jan Kiepura or Wojciech Kossak. The Jakob Haberfeld brand was also resumed with the introduction of six kosher vodkas and liqueurs, which are made in cooperation with the production plant of the Nissenbaum Family Foundation in Bielsko-Biała.

The exhibition is also a story about the fate of one of the two most influential Jewish families in Oświęcim. The fate was dramatically interrupted by the outbreak of World War II and the murder of 5-year-old Franciszka Henryka Haberfeld in the death camp in Bełżec.
