= Jakub a Terezka =

1999 video game

- Developers: JRC Interactive, Česká spořitelna
- Publishers: JRC Interactive, Česká spořitelna
- Platform: Windows
- Release: 1999
- Genre: Point-and-click

Jakub a Terezka is a Czech adventure game by JRC Interactive and Česká spořitelna.

== Plot and gameplay ==
The game centres around a young man named Jakub who discovers his girlfriend is addicted to heroin. His job is to convince her to begin treatment using lawful methods.

== Production ==
The game was built using the CPAL engine. Created for the Stop Drugs campaign, it is a humanitarian project, and was given away free. Jan Hloušek served as the game's chief programmer while Jan Zemanek did the graphic design.

The characters of Jakub and Terezka have had a life beyond this original game; for example an app was designed that saw the duo overcome the puzzles and riddles that the Sorcerer Matthew has prepared for them.

== Critical reception ==
Bonusweb.cz decided it was wrong to give the game a numerical rating as despite it being technically poor and short, as a humanitarian project it had intrinsic value.
