= Jakub Kolář =

Czech ice hockey player

- Born: June 15, 1992 (age 32)
- Height: 6 ft 3 in (191 cm)
- Weight: 190 lb (86 kg; 13 st 8 lb)
- Position: Defence
- Shot: Left
- Played for: HC Sparta Praha
- Playing career: 2011–2015

Jakub Kolář (born June 15, 1992) is a Czech former professional ice hockey defenceman. He played seven games with HC Sparta Praha in the Czech Extraliga during the 2010–11 Czech Extraliga season.
