= Jakub Kunvaldský =

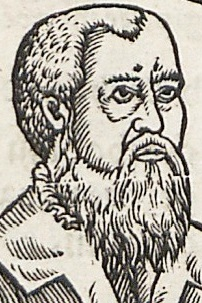

Jakub Kunvaldský (1528–1578) or Jakub Zežula (Zezhula) was a Czech Lutheran clergyman from Moravia, an educator, composer, and editor of hymnals.

He was born in Kunín. He worked among other places in Přerov and Starý Jičín.

He was the editor of the hymnals Písně chval Božských (Songs of Divine Worship, 1572) and Nešpor český (Czech Vespers, 1576). Both of them were printed in Olomouc.

He died in Starý Jičín.

== Bibliography ==
- Josef Jireček, Jakub Kunwaldský a jeho kancionál. Časopis Matice moravské, 1874.
