= Jakub Červeň =

Slovak football goalkeeper

Personal information
- Full name: Jakub Červeň
- Date of birth: 8 April 2001 (age 25)
- Place of birth: Slovakia
- Height: 1.93 m (6 ft 4 in)
- Position: Goalkeeper

Team information
- Current team: Dolný Kubín

Youth career
- 2007–2014: FC TJ Oravský Podzámok
- 2014: → Námestovo (loan)
- 2015–2019: Ružomberok

Senior career*
Years	Team	Apps	(Gls)
2019–2020	Ružomberok B	6	(0)
2019–	Ružomberok	1	(0)
2022–	→ Dolný Kubín (loan)	3	(0)
- * Club domestic league appearances and goals as of 11 June 2022

Jakub Cerven (born 8 April 2001) is a Slovak professional footballer who plays as a goalkeeper for Dolný Kubín.

== Club career ==
=== MFK Ružomberok ===
Červeň made his Fortuna Liga debut for Ružomberok against Zemplín Michalovce on 20 March 2021.

== Personal life ==
According to his social media communications, Červeň is a Christian.
