= Jakub Szulc =

Polish politician

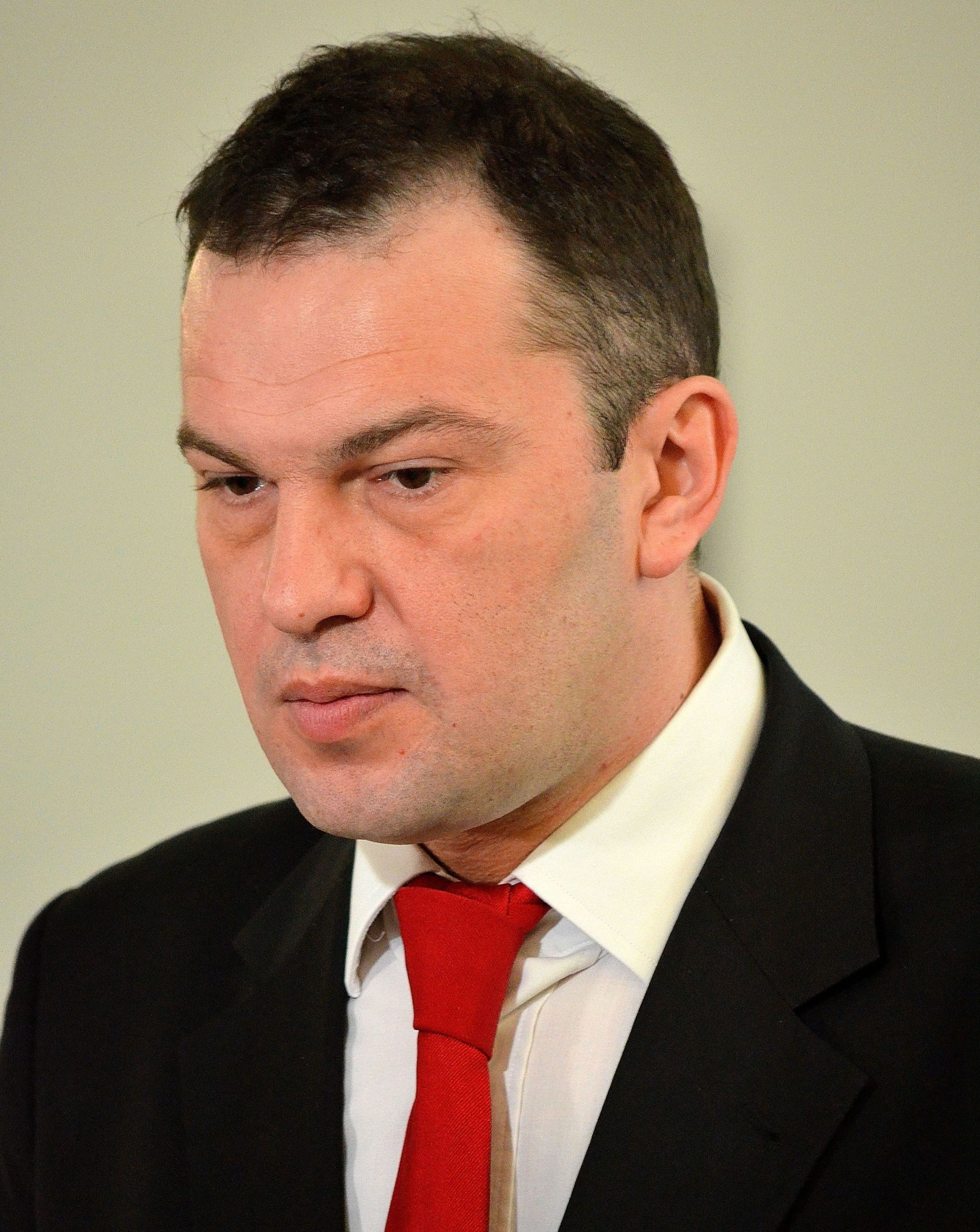

Member of the Sejm
- Incumbent
- Assumed office 25 September 2005
- Constituency: 2 – Wałbrzych

Personal details
- Born: 21 December 1973 (age 52)
- Party: Civic Platform

Jakub Maciej Szulc (born 21 December 1973 in Kłodzko) is a Polish politician. He was elected to the Sejm on 25 September 2005, getting 5004 votes in 2 Wałbrzych district AS A candidatE from the Civic Platform list.

== See also ==
- Members of Polish Sejm 2005-2007
