= Jakub Azulewicz =

Polish–Lithuanian colonel (died 1794)

- Coat of arms: Azulewicz coat of arms
- Born: 1 January 1731; Studzianka, Polish–Lithuanian Commonwealth
- Died: 11 August 1794 (aged 63)
- Buried: Studzianka's Muslim cemetery
- Father: Aleksander Mustafa Azulewicz
- Mother: Felicjanna née Tuhan - Baranowski

Jakub Azulewicz (around 1731 or 1745 – 11 August 1794) was the colonel of the 2nd Regiment of Ułan's Court, later renamed as the 6th Lithuanian Vanguard Regiment.

== Early life ==
Jakub Azulewicz was born in 1731 or 1745 in the Studzianka estates in the Gmina Łomazy, an estate of the Azulewicz family. The Azulewicz (alternative spelling Aziulewicze) had the Azulewicz and Alabanda coat of arms. Jakub Azulewicz was the son of the royal captain Aleksander Mustafa Azulewicz and Felicjanna née Tuhan-Baranowski, the owners of the Studzianka estate.

== Grand Duchy of Lithuania ==
On 20 March 1775, he obtained a royal colonel's patent for the 2nd Light Cavalry Regiment of Ułan's Court, which was mainly composed of Tatars.

=== Great Sejm of 1788-1792 ===
On 7 May 1792, King Stanisław August Poniatowski proposed to the Military Commission to transfer the regiment to the full-time Grand Ducal Lithuanian Army, which took place on 15 May 1792. In July 1792, the unit was renamed the 6th Lithuanian Vanguard Regiment. Jakub's brother, Lieutenant Abraham Azulewicz, and his three sons also served in this regiment: Ensign Dawid Azulewicz, Ensign Abraham Azulewicz and Captain Maciej (Mustafa) Azulewicz.

=== Kościuszko Uprising ===
Jakub Azulewicz was one of the first military commanders to join the Kościuszko Uprising in April 1794. His regiment was in the Lithuanian division of Prince Pranciškus Sapiega. On 2 August 1794, the regiment entered Vilnius to take part in its defense.

Colonel Jakub Azulewicz was killed on 11 August 1794 during a cavalry charge on the Russians, who had broken through the defensive positions.

== Burial ==
After his death, he was buried in Studzianka's Muslim cemetery.

== Bibliography ==
- Kołodziejczyk Arkadiusz - "Colonel Jakub Azulewicz - commander of the 6th Front Guard Regiment of the Grand Duchy of Lithuania" - Przegląd Tatarski 2/2009 pp. 4 - 8 (http://bazhum.muzhp.pl/media//files/Niepodleglosc_i_Pamiec/Niepodleglosc_i_Pamiec-r2009-t16-n1_%2829%29/Niepodleglosc_i_Pamiec-r2009-t16-n1_%2829%29-s5-18/Niepodleglosc_i_Pamiec-r2009-t16-n1_%2829%29-s5-18.pdf)

== See also ==
- Stanisław Kryczyński, in: Polski Słownik Biograficzny. T. 1. Krakow: Polish Academy of Learning - Main Composition in Gebethner and Wolff Bookstores, 1935, p. 191. Reprint: Zakład Narodowy im. Ossolińskich, Krakow 1989, ISBN 83-04-03484-0
