= Jakub Kotala =

Czech ice hockey player

- Born: June 15, 1996 (age 28); Havířov, Czech Republic
- Height: 6 ft 2 in (188 cm)
- Weight: 201 lb (91 kg; 14 st 5 lb)
- Position: Forward
- Shoots: Left
- ELH team Former teams: HC Vítkovice; BK Mladá Boleslav; HC Olomouc
- Playing career: 2014–present

Jakub Kotala (born June 15, 1996) is a Czech professional ice hockey player. He is currently playing for HC Vítkovice Ridera of the Czech Extraliga (ELH).

Kotala made his Czech Extraliga debut playing with BK Mladá Boleslav during the 2014–15 Czech Extraliga season.
