= Jakub Stehlík =

Czech ice hockey player

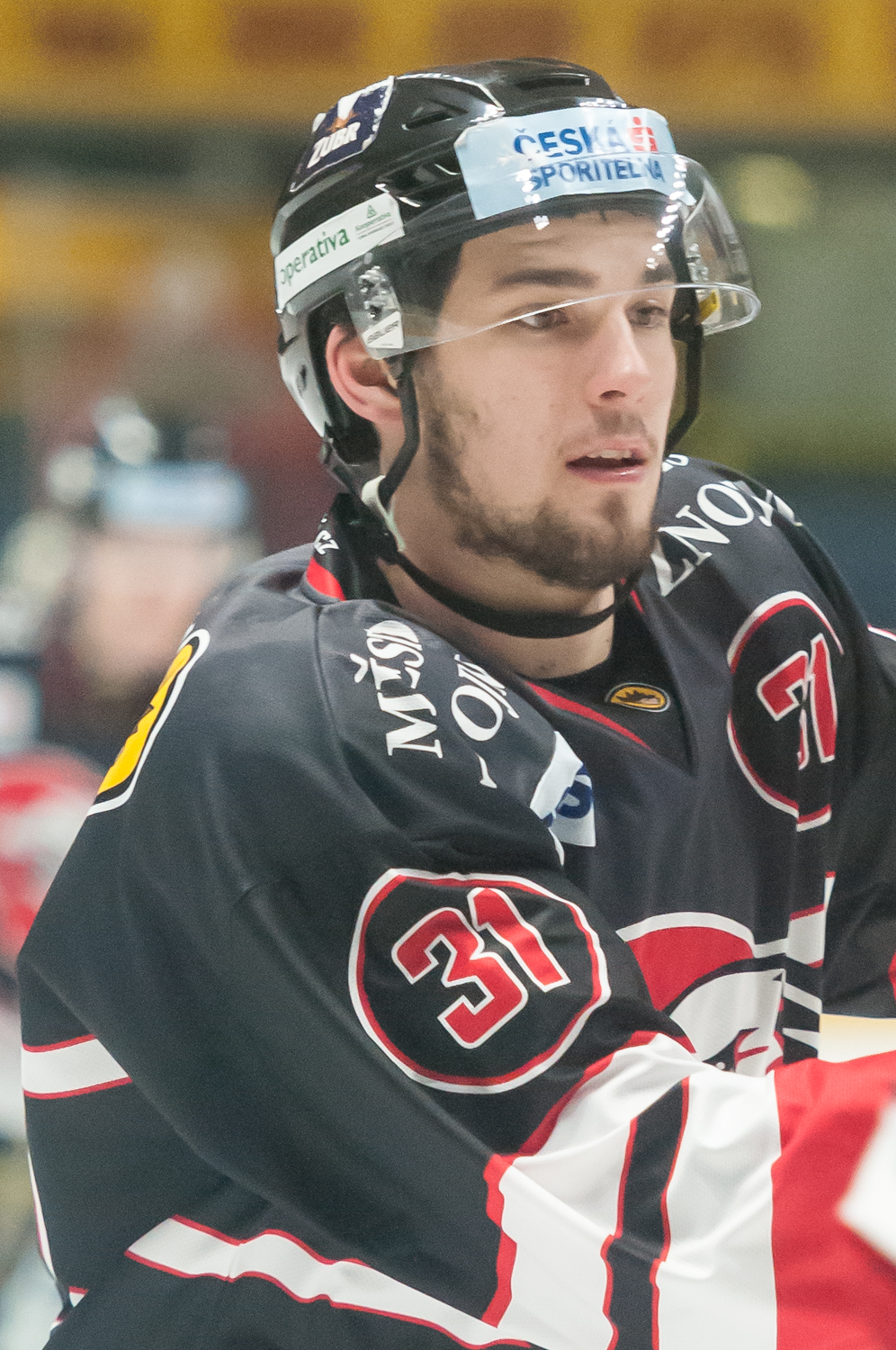
- Born: October 29, 1990 (age 34); Znojmo, Czechoslovakia
- Height: 6 ft 3 in (191 cm)
- Weight: 209 lb (95 kg; 14 st 13 lb)
- Position: Defence
- Shoots: Right
- ELH team Former teams: HC Vítkovice; Orli Znojmo; Piráti Chomutov
- Playing career: 2011–present

Jakub Stehlík (born October 29, 1990) is a Czech professional ice hockey defenceman. He currently plays with HC Vítkovice Ridera in the Czech Extraliga (ELH).

He began his career with Orli Znojmo in the Austrian Hockey League (EBEL), before Stehlík made his Czech Extraliga debut playing with Piráti Chomutov debut during the 2012–13 Czech Extraliga season.
