= Jakub Rybárik =

Slovak actor (born 1986)

Jakub Rybárik (Slovak pronunciation: [ˈjakup ˈribaːrik]; born 17 April 1986 in Bratislava) is a Slovak actor. He studied acting at the Academy of Performing Arts in Bratislava from 2004 to 2008 under the direction of Emil Horváth and Peter Mikulik. He is one of the representatives of the current young generation of Slovak actors.

== Acting ==
His acting is characterized by a rational tone, play with voice and gesture, mimics and flexibility. Representative of young men with rebels outlook on their surroundings, archetype so common in contemporary drama in East and Central Europe. In his work we can find psychological drama - a realistic figure drawing with an emphasis on intellectual background, but also key features of spontaneous character. He also enrich his characters with finer and comic lines.

=== Theater Andrej Bagar in Nitra ===
After graduation he got an engagement at the Theatre of Andrej Bagar in Nitra. After small or medium-sized characters in productions Farms -confusion (Andrew), Piarg (John) Sardines in a scene (Tim) or King Lear (Knight) Rybárik got the great opportunity to play in the production of Jean Anouilh Columbine, directed by Emil Horváth. He became famous after creating a character of Tom in The Glass Menagerie of Tennessee Williams (2011). His has declaimed Ginsberg's poem Howl.

== List of characters ==
William Shakespeare: Romeo and Juliet (Waiting actor) Astorka KORZO '90 Bratislava

Anton Chekhov: Ivanov (Kosych) Academy of Performing Arts

Hana Naglik: Jurgová Hana Academy of Performing Arts

Miroslav Dacho: For sale (Celý) Theatre Ludus

Henrik Ibsen's Hedda Gabler (Eilert Lovborg) Academy of Performing Arts

William Shakespeare: Hamlet (Marcellus) Slovak National Theatre

Who's Afraid of the Beatles (Cinematographer) Slovak National Theatre

David Mamet: Sexual perversity in Chicago (Ramon) Academy of Performing Arts

William Shakespeare: Twelfth Night (Antonio) Slovak National Theatre

Joseph Gregor Tajovský: Farms-messes (Ondrej) Theatre Andrej Bagar

Roman Polak: Piargy (Jano) Theatre of Andrej Bagar

Ivan Kusan: Carugate (Nikola Žažč) Meteorit International Theatre Group

Michael Frayn: Sardines on the scene, please! (Tim Allgood) Theatre Andrej Bagar

William Shakespeare: King Lear (Knight) Theatre Andrej Bagar

Ivan Bukovčan: Until the cock sings (Hobo) Arteatro

Jean Anouilh: Columbine (Julien) Theatre Andrej Bagar

Carlo Goldoni: Fan (Evaristo) Slovak National Theatre

Kamil Žižka: Ghost (Baca, Mayor, Devil 2, Chamberlain) Theatre Andrej Bagar

Arnold Wesker: Kitchen (Alfredo) Theatre Andrej Bagar

Tennessee Williams: The Glass Menagerie (Tom) Theatre Andrej Bagar
