= Jakub Drozd =

Czech footballer

Personal information
- Date of birth: 13 June 2003 (age 23)
- Place of birth: Czech Republic
- Position: Midfielder

Team information
- Current team: Baník Ostrava B
- Number: 10

Youth career
- 2010–2017: FC Hlučín
- 2017–2020: Baník Ostrava

Senior career*
Years	Team	Apps	(Gls)
2020–	Baník Ostrava B	80	(14)
2020–	Baník Ostrava	6	(0)
2021–2022	→ MAS Táborsko (loan)	11	(0)

International career
2018	Czech Republic U15	7	(0)
2018–2019	Czech Republic U16	12	(2)
2019–2020	Czech Republic U17	10	(2)
2021–2022	Czech Republic U19	12	(2)
2022	Czech Republic U20	1	(0)
- * Club domestic league appearances and goals as of 19:55, 3 June 2024 (UTC)

Jakub Drozd (born 13 June 2003) is a Czech professional footballer who plays as a midfielder for the B-team of FC Baník Ostrava.

== Club career ==
Drozd made his professional debut for FC Baník Ostrava on 14 June 2020. After that he played in 4 another games and have 5 starts in First Czech League
