= Jamie =

- Pronunciation: /ˈdʒeɪmi/ JAY-mee
- Gender: Unisex, Male (Scotland)
- Language: English, Scots

Origin
- Languages: Scottish English, Scots
- Origin: Diminutive form of James
- Meaning: "holder of the heel" or "supplanter"
- Region of origin: Scotland

Other names
- Variant forms: Jamey; Jaimie; Jaime; Jaimee; Jayme; Jaymi
- Related names: James, Jaime

Jamie is a unisex name. Traditionally a masculine name, it can be a diminutive form of James, and is of Scots language origin. It is also given as a name in its own right. Since the mid-20th century, it has been used as an occasional feminine name particularly in the United States.

== People ==
=== Female ===
- Jamie Allard (born 1971), American politician
- Jamie Anne Allman (born 1977), American actress
- Jamie Anderson (snowboarder) (born 1990), American snowboarder
- Jamie Anderson (musician) (born 1957), American singer, musician
- Jamie Babbit (born 1970), American filmmaker
- Jamie Barton (singer) (born 1981), American mezzo-soprano
- Jamie Baum, American flautist
- Jamie Beck, American photographer and author
- Jamie Becker-Finn (born 1982), American politician
- Jamie Belsito (born 1973), American politician
- Jamie Bernadette (born 1987), American actress
- Jamie Bick (born 2000), German actress
- Jamie Blake (born 1975), American singer-songwriter
- Jamie Blazejewski (born 1977), Australian rugby player
- Jamie Bochert (born 1983), American musician and model
- Jamie Boggs, American athletic administrator
- Jamie Brewer (born 1985), American actress and model
- Jamie Broadnax (born 1980), American journalist
- Jamie Broder (born 1985), Canadian beach volleyball player
- Jamie Broumas (born 1959), American singer
- Jamie Foster Brown (born 1946), African American publisher
- Jamie Burke (rugby union) (born 1980), US international rugby union player
- Jamie Carey (born 1981), American basketball player and coach
- Jamie Carreau, American politician
- Jamie Chadwick (born 1998), British racing driver
- Jamie Chung (born 1983), American actress
- Jamie Rappaport Clark (born 1950), American conservationist
- Jamie Colby (born 1970), American national news correspondent
- Jamie Lynn Corkish (born 1984), American sport shooter
- Jamie Craighead (born 1980), American college basketball coach
- Jamie Crane-Mauzy (born 1992), American freestyle skier
- Jamie Cruickshank (born 1986), Canadian bobsledder
- Jamie Curry (born 1996), New Zealand YouTube personality, vlogger, and comedian
- Jamie Lee Curtis (born 1958), American actress and author
- Jamie Dantzscher (born 1982), American artistic gymnast
- Jamie Lee Darley (born 1986), American model
- Jamie Denbo (born 1973), American actress
- Jamie deRoy, American theatre producer
- Jamie Donnelly (born 1947), American actress
- Jamie Dutcher, American naturalist, author and sound recorder/sound mixer
- Jamie Eason (born 1976), American fitness model and writer
- Jamie Erdahl (born 1988), American sports reporter
- Jamie Evans, American cannabis and wine professional
- Jamie Farnworth (born 1982), Greek softball player
- Jamie Fellner, American lawyer
- Jamie Finn (born 1998), Irish footballer
- Jamie Flitner (born 1964), American politician
- Jamie S. Foster (born 1970), American astrobiologist, microbiologist, and academic
- Jamie Freveletti (born 1959), American writer of thriller novels
- Jamie Gangel (born 1955), American journalist
- Jamie Gauthier, American politician
- Jamie Geller (born 1978), American cookbook author
- Jamie Gerstenberg (born 2002), German association football player
- Jamie Gilgen (born 1981), Canadian cyclist
- Jamie Gilson (1933–2020), American children's writer
- Jamie Ginn (born 1982), American beauty pageant contestant
- Jamie Golder (born 1962), American tennis player
- Jamie Gorelick (born 1950), American lawyer
- Jamie Gorenberg, American television producer and writer
- Jamie Grace (born 1991), American musician
- Jamie Greubel (born 1983), American bobsledder
- Jamie Grosshans (born 1978), American judge
- Jamie Gunns (born 1985), British fashion model
- Jamie Hagerman (born 1981), American ice hockey player
- Jamie Hampton (born 1990), American tennis player
- Jamie Harpootlian (born 1959), American lawyer and diplomat
- Jamie Haskell (born 1980), American curler
- Jamie Hayter (born 1995), English professional wrestler
- Jamie Lee Henry, American military officer and doctor
- Jamie Herrell (born 1994), Filipino journalist and beauty queen
- Jamie Hersch (born 1987), American sports journalist
- Jamie Hooyman (born 1963), American academic
- Jamie Howe (born 1984), American television auto racing reporter
- Jamie Gray Hyder (born 1985), American actress and model
- Jamie Isenstein (born 1975), American artist
- Jamie Ison (born 1953), American politician
- Jamie Jackson (politician), American politician
- Jamie (singer) (born 1997), South Korean singer
- Jamie Johnson (politician), American politician
- Jamie Leigh Jones (born 1985), American advocate
- Jamie Korngold (born 1965), American Reform Jewish rabbi
- Jamie A. Koufman, American physician
- Jamie Kovac (born 1977), American actress, body builder, and civil engineer
- Jamie Marina Lau (born 1985), Australian novelist
- Jamie Lauren, American chef
- Jamie Lee (comedian) (born 1983), American comedian and screenwriter
- Jamie Lever (born 1987), Indian actress and comedian
- Jamie Chai Yun Liew, Canadian writer and lawyer
- Jamie Likins, American clubwoman
- Jamie Lilly (born 1983), American bicycle motocross rider
- Jamie Lim (born 1997), Filipino karateka
- Jamie Kern Lima (born 1977), American entrepreneur and journalist
- Jamie Little (born 1978), American sportscaster
- Jamie Loeb (born 1995), American tennis player
- Jamie Loftus (born 1993), American comedian and writer
- Jamie Luner (born 1971), American actress
- Jamie Lynn Macchia (born 1991), Miss New York 2015
- Jamie Macdonald (speed skater) (born 1994), Canadian short-track speed skater
- Jamie MacDonald (singer), American Christian pop singer
- Jamie Mackay (born 2003), American professional baseball catcher
- Jamie Marchi (born 1977), American voice actress
- Jamie Margolin, American climate change activist
- Jamie Marich, Croatian-American trauma specialist, author and expressive artist
- Jamie Martens, Canadian politician
- Jamie Mason, American author
- Jamie McCourt (born 1953), American diplomat, attorney, & executive
- Jamie McDell (born 1992), New Zealand singer-songwriter
- Jamie McLeod-Skinner (born 1967), American attorney
- Jamie McNeair (born 1969), American heptathlete
- Jamie Melham (born 1995), Australian jockey
- Jamie Mitchell (boxer) (born 1985), American boxer
- Jamie Molaro (born 1986), American planetary scientist
- Jamie Morgenstern, American computer scientist
- Jamie Moyle (born 1989), American mixed martial arts fighter
- Jamie Mueller (softball), American softball coach
- Jamie Van Natta (born 1978), American archer
- Jamie Nelson (ice hockey) (born 2002), American ice hockey player
- Jamie Lindemann Nelson, American philosophy professor and bioethicist
- Jamie Neushul (born 1995), American water polo player
- Jamie O'Brien (beauty queen) (born 1988), American television host
- Jamie O'Neal (born 1968), Australian singer-songwriter
- Jamie Okuma (born 1977), Native American fashion designer and visual artist
- Jamie Orchard, Canadian journalist
- Jamie Otis (born 1986), American television personality
- Jamie Owens-Collins (born 1954), American composer, singer and songwriter
- Jamie Paik, Canadian roboticist
- Jamie Peck (podcaster), American writer, podcaster, and model
- Jamie Perkins (born 2005), Australian swimmer
- Jamie T. Phelps (1941–2025), American Catholic theologian
- Jamie Pineda (born 1988), American musician
- Jamie Pollock (soccer, born 1989), American soccer player
- Jamie Quatro, American fiction writer
- Jamie Paulin Ramirez, American convert to Islam
- Jamie Lee Rattray (born 1992), Canadian ice hockey player
- Jamie Redman (born 1986), American rower
- Jamie Reid (swimmer) (born 1983), American swimmer
- Jamie Richards (translator), American translator
- Jamie Rivera (born 1966), Filipino singer
- Jamie Romeo (born 1984/85), American politician
- Jamie Rose (born 1959), American actress and acting instructor
- Jamie Salé (born 1977), Canadian pair skater
- Jamie Sanders, American horse trainer
- Jamie Sasson, Venezuelan actress and model
- Jamie Scott (basketball) (born 1994), American-Canadian basketball player
- Jamie Aleshia Scott (born 1982), American politician from Arkansas
- Jamie Shepherd (born 2000), American soccer player
- Jamie Sherrill, American television personality
- Jamie Silberhartz (born 1981), American actress
- Jamie Silverstein (born 1983), American ice dancer
- Jamie Sinclair (born 1992), Canadian-American curler
- Jamie Smith (curler) (born 2001), Canadian curler
- Jamie Renée Smith (born 1987), American actress
- Jamie Solinger (born 1975), American beauty queen and model
- Jamie Sorrentini, American actress
- Jamie Lynn Spears (born 1991), American actress and singer
- Jamie Speiser-Blanchet, Royal Canadian Air Force officer
- Jamie Stang, American dietitian and nutritionist
- Jamie Stanton (born 1995), Australian rules footballer
- Jamie Subandhi (born 1989), American badminton player
- Jamie Summers (born 1968), American pornographic film actress
- Jamie Tarabay (born 1975), Australian journalist
- Jamie Tarses (1964–2021), American television producer
- Jamie Thompson (politician), American politician from Michigan
- Jamie Tisch (born 1968), American businesswoman
- Jamie Trachsel (born 1979), American softball coach
- Jamie Turndorf (born 1958), American psychotherapist
- Jamie Langston Turner (born 1949), American novelist
- Jamie Sue Weiss, American make-up artist
- Jamie White (born 1968), American radio personality and actress
- Jamie Whitmore (born 1976), American triathlete and para-cyclist
- Jamie Lee Wilson, Australian singer/songwriter
- Jamie Wong (cyclist) (born 1986), Hong Kong cyclist
- Jamie Woodson (born 1972), American politician
- Jamie Yeo (born 1977), Singaporean actress and radio presenter
- Jamie Yeung (born 1997), Hong Kong swimmer
- Jamie Zeppa, Canadian writer

=== Male ===
==== A–E ====
- Jamie Adams (footballer) (born 1987), Scottish footballer
- Jamie Allen (disambiguation)
- Jamie Anderson (disambiguation)
- Jamie Arnold (baseball) (born 1974), American baseball pitcher
- Jamie Arnold (basketball) (born 1975), American-Israeli basketball player
- Jamie Baillie (born 1966), Canadian politician and CEO of Credit Union Atlantic
- Jamie Bamber (born 1973), English actor
- Jamie Bartlett (1966–2022), English-born South African actor
- Jamie Bates (born 1989), English welterweight kickboxer
- Jamie Bates (footballer) (born 1968), English footballer
- Jamie Baulch (born 1973), British sprinter and television presenter
- Jamie Bell (born 1986), English actor
- Jamie Benn (born 1989), Canadian ice hockey player
- Jamie Bennett (disambiguation)
- Jamie Bond, Australian rules footballer
- Jamie Boreham (born 1978), Canadian football player
- Jamie Brennan (born c. 1996/7), Irish footballer
- Jamie Briggs (born 1977), Australian politician
- Jamie Brooks (born 1983), English football player
- Jamie Brown (disambiguation)
- Jamie Buhrer (born 1989), Australian rugby player
- Jamie Carragher (born 1978), English footballer
- Jamie Coleman (born 1975), American football player
- Jamie Cope (born 1985), English snooker player
- Jamie Crombie (born 1965), American-Canadian squash player
- Jamie Cullum (born 1979), English pianist, singer, and songwriter
- Jamie DeWolf (born 1977), American slam poet
- Jamie Dimon (born 1956), CEO and chairman of J.P. Morgan Chase and Co.
- Jamie Ding (born 1992), American law student, civil servant and television personality
- Jamie Dornan (born 1982), Northern Irish model, actor and musician
- Jamie Drysdale (born 2002), Canadian ice hockey player
- Jamie Durie (born 1970), Australian landscaper and television personality

==== F–N ====
- Jamie Farr (born 1934), American actor
- Jamie Foreman (born 1958), British actor
- Jamie Foxx (born 1967), American actor and musician
- Jamie Gillan (born 1997), American football player
- Jamie Gillis (1943–2010), American porn star
- Jamie Gold (born 1969), American television producer and poker player
- Jamie Gonoud (born 1992/1993), Westmeath Gaelic footballer
- Jamie Harris (actor) (born 1963), British actor
- Jamie Harris (footballer) (born 1979), Welsh footballer
- Jamie Hendry (born 1985), British theatre producer
- Jamie Hewlett (born 1968), comic book artist and co-creator of the band Gorillaz
- Jamie Hyneman (born 1956), American television host
- Jamie Iannone, American businessman, CEO of eBay
- Jamie Johnston (born 1989), Canadian actor
- Jamie Kennedy (born 1970), American comedian and actor
- Jamie Kennedy (chef), Canadian chef
- Jamie King (born 1972), British television actor
- Jamie Korab (born 1979), Canadian curler
- Jamie Kurisko (born 1963), American football player
- Jamie Langenbrunner (born 1975), American hockey player
- Jamie Lee (disambiguation)
- Jamie Lewis (darts player) (born 1991), Welsh darts player
- Jamie Lidell (born 1973), English musician
- Jamie Lyon (born 1982), Australian rugby player
- Jamie Malonzo (born 1996), Filipino-American basketball player
- Jamie Masters (born 1955), Canadian ice hockey player
- Jamie McGonnigal (born 1975), American voice actor
- Jamie McMurray (born 1976), American NASCAR driver
- Jamie McNeair (born 1969), American heptathlete
- Jamie Meder (born 1991), American football player
- Jamie Miller (singer) (born 1997), Welsh singer
- Jamie Moore (boxer) (born 1978), English boxer
- Jamie Moore (jockey) (born 1985), English jockey
- Jamie Moyer (born 1962), baseball player
- Jamie Muir (1942–2025), Scottish painter and musician
- Jamie Murray (born 1986), Scottish tennis player
- Jamie Muscato (born 1990), English actor and singer
- Jamie Newman (born 1997), American football player

==== O–Z ====
- Jamie O'Hara (disambiguation)
- Jamie O'Neill (born 1962), Irish novelist
- Jamie Oldaker (1951–2020), American drummer
- Jamie Oliver (born 1975), TV chef
- Jamie Oliver (musician) (born 1975), member of lostprophets
- Jamie Parker (born 1979), English actor
- Jamie Peck, British geographer
- Jamie Raines (born 1994), English transgender YouTuber and LGBT advocate
- Jamie Raskin (born 1962), American politician
- Jamie Redknapp (born 1973), English footballer
- Jamie Reid (born 1947), English anarchist artist
- Jamie Roberts (born 1986), Welsh rugby player
- Jamie Scott (born 1984), English singer-songwriter and producer
- Jamie Selzler, American politician
- Jamie Silva (born 1984), American football player
- Jamie Smith (disambiguation)
- Jamie Soward (born 1984), Australian rugby player
- Jamie Spencer (born 1980), Irish jockey
- Jamie T (born 1986), stage name of English musician Jamie Treays
- Jamie Theakston (born 1970), English television and radio presenter
- Jamie Thomas (born 1974), American skateboarder
- Jamie Travis (born 1979), Canadian filmmaker
- Jamie Vardy (born 1987), English footballer
- Jamie Waite (born 1986), Thai footballer
- Jamie Walker (disambiguation), multiple people
- Jamie Walsh (rugby league)
- Jamie Walsh (politician)
- Jamie Whincup (born 1983), Australian racing driver
- Jamie Wilkinson, founder of Know Your Meme
- Jamie Wyeth (born 1946), American painter

== Fictional characters ==
- Jamie, a character in the soap opera Hollyoaks
- Jamie, a character in the TV series Malcolm in the Middle
- Jamie, a character in the Street Fighter video game franchise
- Jamie Clapton, in the soap opera Doctors
- Jamie Kane, a UK pop star of an alternate reality game of the same name
- Ja'mie King, an Australian schoolgirl played by Chris Lilley in various Australian TV series
- Jamie Lloyd, in the Halloween film series
- Jamie Madrox, a Marvel superhero, also known as Multiple Man
- Jamie McCrimmon, in Doctor Who, played by Frazer Hines
- Jamie Tartt, a character in Ted Lasso, played by Phil Dunster
- Jamie Tyler, a boy from Anthony Horowitz' Power of Five series

== See also ==
- Jaime, Spanish/Portuguese variant
- Jaimee (disambiguation)
- Jaimie (disambiguation)
- Jamy (disambiguation)
- Jay (given name)
- Jayme, a given name and a surname
