= Jaime =

- Pronunciation: /ˈdʒeɪ.mi/; Spanish: [ˈxaj.me]; Portuguese: [ˈʒaj.mɨ]
- Gender: Unisex; Male (Spanish, Portuguese)
- Language: Spanish, Portuguese, English
- Name day: Spain: July 25th Spain: November 28th

Origin
- Meaning: "holder of the heel" or "supplanter"

Other names
- Cognates: Chaime, Jaume, Iago, Santiago, Tiago, Diego, Diogo
- Anglicisations: James, Jamie, Jacob

Jaime is a common Spanish and Portuguese male given name most commonly used as a nickname for James. It can also be a nickname for Jacobus. In Occitania Jacobus became Jacome and later Jacme. In east Spain, Jacme became Jaime, in Aragon it became Chaime, and in Catalonia it became Jaume. In western Spain Jacobus became Iago.

In the United States, Jaime is used as an independent masculine given name.

For females, it remains less popular, not appearing on the top 1,000 U.S. female names for the past 5 years.

== People ==
- Jaime, Duke of Braganza, Portuguese nobleman of the 15th/16th centuries, the 4th Duke of Braganza
- Infante Jaime, Duke of Segovia (1908–1975), Spanish prince, the second son of Alfonso XIII of Spain and his wife Victoria Eugenie of Battenberg
- Jaime Alguersuari (born 1990), Spanish racing driver
- Jaime Angelopoulos (born 1982), Canadian sculptor
- Jaime Aparicio (1929–2026), Colombian Olympic hurdler
- Jaime Aparicio Otero (born 1955), Bolivian lawyer, diplomat and political consultant
- Jaime Areizaga-Soto, attorney
- Jaime Augusto Zobel de Ayala (born 1959), Filipino businessman, son of Jaime, and current chairman and CEO of Ayala Corporation
- Jaime Augusto Zobel de Ayala (born 1959), Filipino chairman and CEO of the Ayala Corporation
- Jaime Barría (born 1996), Panamanian baseball player
- Jaime Barros Pérez-Cotapos
- Jaime Battiste (born 1979), Canadian politician
- Jaime Bosch, several people
- Jaime Botín (1936–2024), Spanish billionaire heir and banker
- Jaime Bourbonnais (born 1998), Canadian ice hockey player
- Jaime Callica (born 1985), Canadian actor and dancer
- Jaime Camara (born 1980), Brazilian racing driver
- Jaime Camil (born 1973), actor
- Jaime Carbonell, computer scientist at Carnegie Mellon University
- Jaime Castillo Velasco (1914–2003), Chilean politician
- Jaime Churches (born 1988), American politician
- Jaime Clarke (born 1971), American novelist and editor
- Jaime Córdoba (footballer) (born 1988), Colombian footballer
- Jaime Córdoba (politician) (born 1950), Curaçaoan politician
- Jaime Deer, American police officer
- Jaime de Gracia (born 1996), Panamanian footballer
- Jaime de Marichalar (born 1963), former Spanish royalty
- Jaime Duro (born 2000), Spanish canoeist
- Jaime E. Esparza, American lawyer
- Jaime Escalante, Bolivian-American educator and subject of the film Stand and Deliver
- Jaime Eyzaguirre (1908–1968), Chilean lawyer and historian
- Jaime Fabregas (born 1950), Filipino actor and musical scorer
- Jaime Ffrench Jr. (born 2006), American football player
- Jaime Gutiérrez Avendaño (1936–2012), Salvadoran military officer and politician
- Jaime Guttenberg (2003–2018), one of the 17 victims who was killed in the Stoneman Douglas High School shooting
- Jaime Guzmán (1946–1991), Chilean lawyer and politician
- Jaime Hayon, Spanish designer and artist and founder of Hayon Studio
- Jaime Hernández, American cartoonist and co-creator of the comic book series Love and Rockets
- Jaime Hipp, American water polo goalkeeper
- Jaime Huélamo (1948–2014), Spanish road cyclist
- Jaime Jaquez Jr. (born 2001), American basketball player
- Jaime Jiménez Merlo (born 1980), Spanish football (soccer) player commonly known as Jaime
- Jaime King (academic), professor of law
- Jaime King (born 1979), American actress and model
- Jaime King (swimmer) (born 1976), English Olympic swimmer
- Jaime Laredo (born 1941), Bolivian-American director and violist
- Jaime Lloreda (born 1980), Panamanian basketball player
- Jaime Luis Gomez (born 1975), better known as Taboo, American rapper, musician and actor
- Jaime Lyn Beatty, American actress and singer
- Jaime Maussan (born 1953), Mexican journalist
- Jaime Meline, aka El-P, hip-hop artist
- Jaime Melo (born 1980), Brazilian racing driver
- Jaime Moreno (born 1974), Bolivian football (soccer) player
- Jaime Morón (1950–2005), Colombian footballer
- Jaime Murray (born 1976), British actress
- Jaime Nunó (1824–1908), Spanish composer
- Jaime Patricio Ramírez (born 1967), Chilean football (soccer) player
- Jaime Pinto Bravo (born 1939), Chilean professional tennis player
- Jaime Preciado, bassist of the rock band Pierce the Veil
- Jaime Pressly (born 1977), American actress
- Jaime Queralt-Lortzing Beckmann, Spanish rally driver (winner Rally España Histórico 2009)
- Jaime Ray Newman (born 1978), American actress and singer
- Jaime Reis (born 1983), Portuguese composer
- Jaime Rest (1927–1979), Argentine translator, literary critic, writer and teacher
- Jaime Reyes (skateboarder), American skateboarder
- Jaime Royal "Robbie" Robertson (1943–2023), Canadian musician
- Jaime Sánchez Fernández (born 1973), Spanish footballer
- Jaime Sin, Filipino Catholic cardinal who took part in the People Power Revolution
- Jaime Vera (born 1963), Chilean football (soccer) player
- Jaime Yzaga (born 1967), Peruvian tennis player
- Jaime Zobel de Ayala (born 1934), Filipino businessman and chairman emeritus of Ayala Corporation

== Characters ==
- Jaime Castro, a character in the television series Broad City
- Jaime Garabito, the real name of the character of Jaimito the Mailman in the Mexican television sitcom series El Chavo del Ocho
- Jaime Lannister, known as "Kingslayer", a character in the fantasy epic novel series A Song of Ice and Fire and its derived works such as TV series Game of Thrones.
- Jaime Reyes (comics), a DC Comics superhero known as Blue Beetle
- Jaime Rosales, a character in Cassandra Clare's Lady Midnight
- Jaime Sommers (The Bionic Woman), the title character of the 1976 TV series The Bionic Woman
- Jaime Sommers (Bionic Woman), the title character of the 2007 TV series Bionic Woman

== Surname ==
- Adolphe Jaime also known as Jaime fils (1825–1901), French playwright
- Aguinaldo Jaime (born 1954), Angolan politician and economist
- Álex Jaime (born 1998), Spanish cyclist
- Blanca Jaime (born 1965), Mexican long-distance runner
- Chito Jaime (born 1983), Filipino basketball player
- Christopher Jaime (born 2004), American soccer player
- Ernest Jaime (1804–1884), French painter, art historian and playwright
- Fortino Jaime (ca. 1882–1951), Mexican publisher, printer and bookbinder
- Guillem Jaime (born 1999), Spanish footballer
- Héctor Osuna Jaime (born 1957), Mexican architect and politician
- Iván Jaime (born 2000), Spanish footballer
- José Belarmino Jaime, Salvadoran judge
- José Luis Jaime Correa (born 1953), Mexican politician
- Juan Jaime (baseball) (1987–2024), Dominican baseball player
- Juan Jaime (footballer) (born 1993), Argentine footballer
- Juana Bonilla Jaime (born 1961), Mexican politician
- Léo Jaime (born 1960), Brazilian musician, actor and writer
- Marco Cesar Jaime Jr. (born 1995), American soccer player
- Mercedes Chaves Jaime (1956–2005), Colombian psychologist, pedagogue and academic
- Omar Israel Jaime (born 1981), Mexican footballer
- Rafael Galindo Jaime (born 1952), Mexican politician
- Ricardo Jaime (born 1955), Argentine politician
- Sebastián Jaime (born 1987), Argentine footballer

== See also ==
- Domingo Romeo Jaime, one of the pioneers of Cuban Scouting
- Jaime (1974 film), a Portuguese film directed by António Reis
- Jaime (1999 film), a 1999 Portuguese film
- Jaime (album), a 2019 album from Brittany Howard
- Jaimee (disambiguation)
- Jaimes
- Jaimie
- James (name)
- Jamie
