= Jammy =

Jammy, jammie or jammies may refer to:

== Entertainment and media ==
- Jammy, a character in the film Good Bad Ugly
- Jammy, a character in the television series Maynila
- Jammy, a character from the sixth season of Battle for Dream Island, an animated web series
- Jammy, a minor character in the sitcom Gavin & Stacey
- Jammy Awards, an awards show for jam bands
- Jammie Awards, an awards show presented by the radio station WYCE

== People ==
=== In government and military ===
- Jammy Shah Al-Islam, a retired Bruneian police officer
- Jammy Cruz, involved in a flood control projects scandal in the Philippines
- Jammie Jamieson, a United States Air Force officer
- Satyendra Singh Jamwal "Jammy", Indian Navy officer

=== Sportspeople ===
- Jammie Kirlew, an American former professional football player
- Jammie Deese, an American football coach
- Jammie Robinson, an American professional football safety
- Jammie Clinch, an Irish rugby player and medical practitioner

=== Other people ===
- Jammy, a producer of the album Interview with a Madman
- King Jammy, a Jamaican dub mixer
- Jammie Thomas-Rasset, involved in a lawsuit with Capitol Records
- Joseph Acton Morris, an English geographer also known as "Jammy"

== Other uses ==
- Jammy, a wine tasting descriptor
- Jammy Jellyfish, the codename of version 22.04 of the Ubuntu Linux distribution
- Jammies, a colloquial name for pajamas

== See also ==
- Jam (disambiguation)
- Jamy
- Jammu (disambiguation)
- Jamie (disambiguation)
