= Jamie (disambiguation) =

Jamie is a given name.

Jamie may also refer to:

== Music ==
- Jamie Records, an American record label
- The Jamies, an American doo wop group
- Jamie, a 2021 album by B Wise
- "Jamie", a 1961 song by Eddie Holland
- "Jamie", a 1984 song by Ray Parker Jr.
- "Jamie", a 1994 B-side to the Weezer song "Buddy Holly"

== People with the surname ==
- Kathleen Jamie (born 1962), Scottish poet
- Poppy Jamie (born 1990), British entrepreneur and former television presenter

== Other uses ==
- Jamie (TV series), a 1953-54 American sitcom
- Jamie, a 2020 short film by Esmé Creed-Miles
- Jamie, the title character of Everybody's Talking About Jamie, a 2017 West End musical

== See also ==
- Jaime
- Jaimie
- Jamey
- Jamy (disambiguation)
