= Jaime (disambiguation) =

Jaime is a common Spanish and Portuguese male given name.

Jaime may also refer to:

- Jaime (1974 film), a Portuguese documentary film
- Jaime (1999 film), a Portuguese drama film
- Jaime (album), a 2019 album by Brittany Howard

== See also ==
- Jamie (disambiguation)
- James (disambiguation)
