= Kamie =

Kamie is a feminine given name. Notable people with the name include:

- Kamie Crawford (born 1992), American television host and beauty pageant winner
- Kamie Ethridge (born 1964), American basketball player and coach

== See also ==
- Jamie
