= Jayme =

Jayme is a unisex given name and a surname which may refer to:

Given name:

- Jayme Alaric de Perpignan, ambassador from Pope Clement IV and James I of Aragon to the Mongol ruler Abaqa Khan in 1267
- Jayme de Almeida (born 1953), Brazilian football assistant coach and former player and manager
- Jayme Lynn Blaschke (born 1969), American journalist and author
- Jayme Caetano Braun (1924–1999), Brazilian folk musician, poet and composer
- Jayme Cramer (born 1983), American swimmer
- Jayme Garfinkel (born 1945), Brazilian billionaire, Chairman of the Board and CEO of Porto Seguro Seguros, a large insurance company
- Jayme Lawson (born 2001), American actress
- Jayme Mitchell (born 1984), American former football player
- Jayme Richardson (born 1989), Australian Paralympic cyclist
- Jayme Stone (fl. 2007-present}, Canadian banjoist, composer and producer
- Jayme Luiz Szwarcfiter (born 1942), Brazilian computer scientist
- Jayme Tiomno (1920–2011), Brazilian physicist

Surname:

- Antonio Ledesma Jayme (1854-1937), Filipino lawyer, revolutionary, Governor of Negros Occidental and assemblyman
- Carlos Jayme (born 1980), Brazilian retired swimmer
- Erik Jayme (born 1934), Canadian-born German law professor
- Luis Jayme (1740-1775), Spanish Roman Catholic priest, missionary in America and martyr

== See also ==
- Jaymee Joaquin (born 1985), Filipina actress, model and game show host
- Jamie, a given name
- Jaymes, a surname
