= James O'Hara =

James O'Hara may refer to:

- James O'Hara, 2nd Baron Tyrawley (1682–1774), British Army officer
- James E. O'Hara (1844–1905), U.S. Representative from North Carolina
- James G. O'Hara (1925–1989), U.S. Representative from Michigan
- James O'Hara (announcer), Scottish former television announcer, now audio description specialist
- James O'Hara (quartermaster) (c. 1752–1819), Continental Army officer, U.S. Army quartermaster
  - USS James O'Hara, a Frederick Funston-class attack transport
- James O'Hara (actor) (1927–1992), Irish-born American actor
- James O'Hara (Latinist) (born 1959), American scholar of Latin literature
- James O'Hara (1796–1838), Irish politician, Member of Parliament for Galway Borough 1826–1831
- James O'Hara (singer) (1950–2021), American country singer
- James O'Hara (footballer) (2006-) originally from Takapuna, New Zealand now in the United Kingdom is well known for his goalkeeping.

== See also ==
- Jim O'Hara (born 1954) American businessman and politician
- Jim O'Hara (footballer) (1874–1960), Australian rules footballer
- Jamie O'Hara (disambiguation)
