= Tarabay =

Tarabay is a name. Notable people with the name include:

- Tarabay dynasty, Bedouin dynasty of governors and chiefs in northern Ottoman Palestine
- Tarabay ibn Qaraja (circa mid-16th century), Arab chieftain and governor
- Anthony Tarabay (born 1967), Maronite Catholic bishop
- Jamie Tarabay (born 1975), Australian journalist
- Nick E. Tarabay (born 1975), Lebanese-American actor
