= Dorothy Olsen =

American aviator (1916–2019)

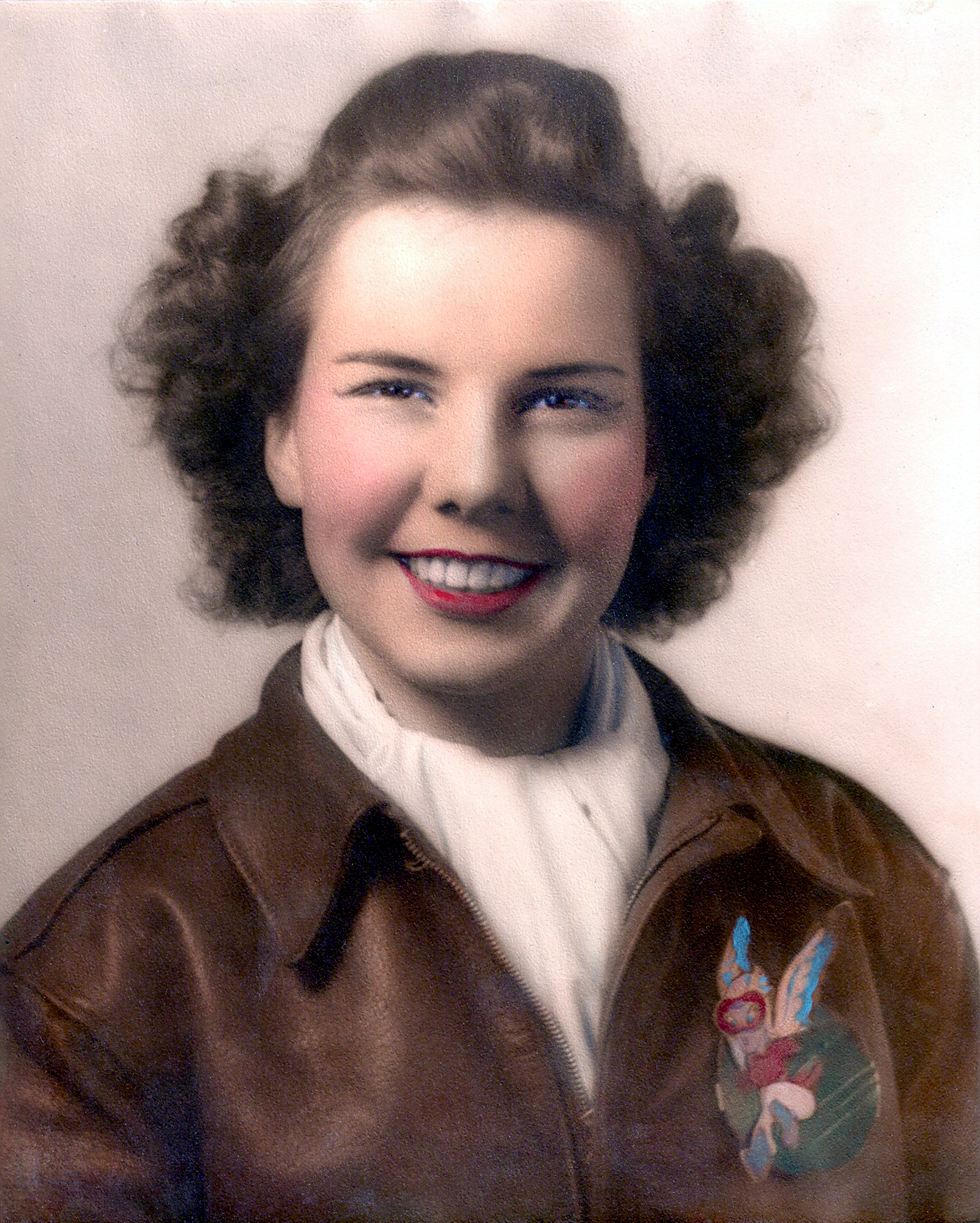
- Kocher c. 1943 (U.S. Air Force photo).
- Born: Dorothy Eleanor Kocher; July 10, 1916; Woodburn, Oregon, U.S.
- Died: July 23, 2019 (aged 103); University Place, Washington, U.S.
- Known for: Member of Women Airforce Service Pilots (WASP)

Dorothy Eleanor Olsen (née Kocher; July 10, 1916 – July 23, 2019) was an American aircraft pilot and member of the Women Airforce Service Pilots (WASPs) during World War II. She grew up on her family's farm in Woodburn, Oregon, developing an interest in aviation from a young age. She earned her private pilot certificate in 1939, when it was unusual for women to be pilots.

In 1943, Olsen joined the newly formed WASPs as a civil service employee. After training in Texas, she was assigned to the Sixth Ferrying Group in Long Beach, California, where she worked ferrying new aircraft from the factories where they were built to U.S. airbases. She flew more than 20 types of military airplanes, including high-performance fighters such as the P-51 Mustang and the twin-engine P-38 Lightning, which she favored over larger aircraft such as bombers; she was particularly fond of the P-51.

After the war, Olsen retired from flying and moved to the state of Washington, where she married, raised a family, and lived for the rest of her life. In 2009, she was awarded the Congressional Gold Medal honoring her service during the war. Olsen died in 2019 aged 103.

== Early life ==
Dorothy Eleanor Olsen was born in Woodburn, near Portland, Oregon, on July 10, 1916, to Ralph and Frances (Zimmering) Kocher, and grew up on the family's small farm. At the age of eight, she decided she wanted to fly airplanes after reading The Red Knight of Germany, Floyd Gibbons's biography of World War I flying ace Manfred von Richthofen. Olsen's introduction to flight was when she took a biplane ride at a state fair, which inspired her to take flying lessons; the cost of the flight reportedly exhausted her entire savings. In 2011, she told the Chinook Observer:

From the time I was a little girl and jumped from the top of our barn in Woodburn, Oregon, and into the hay until the time I was flying night missions as a Woman Airforce Service Pilot (WASP) over moon-lit Texas during World War II, I just loved to fly.

After leaving high school, Olsen worked briefly as a dance instructor. She earned her private pilot's license in 1939, taking her checkride in a 40 hp (30 kW) Taylorcraft. Reportedly one of only three women in the Portland area to have a private pilot's license at the time, Olsen flew with the Woodburn Flying Club (she recalled being the only woman among nineteen men), and with the Civil Air Patrol in Portland and The Dalles.

== WASPs ==
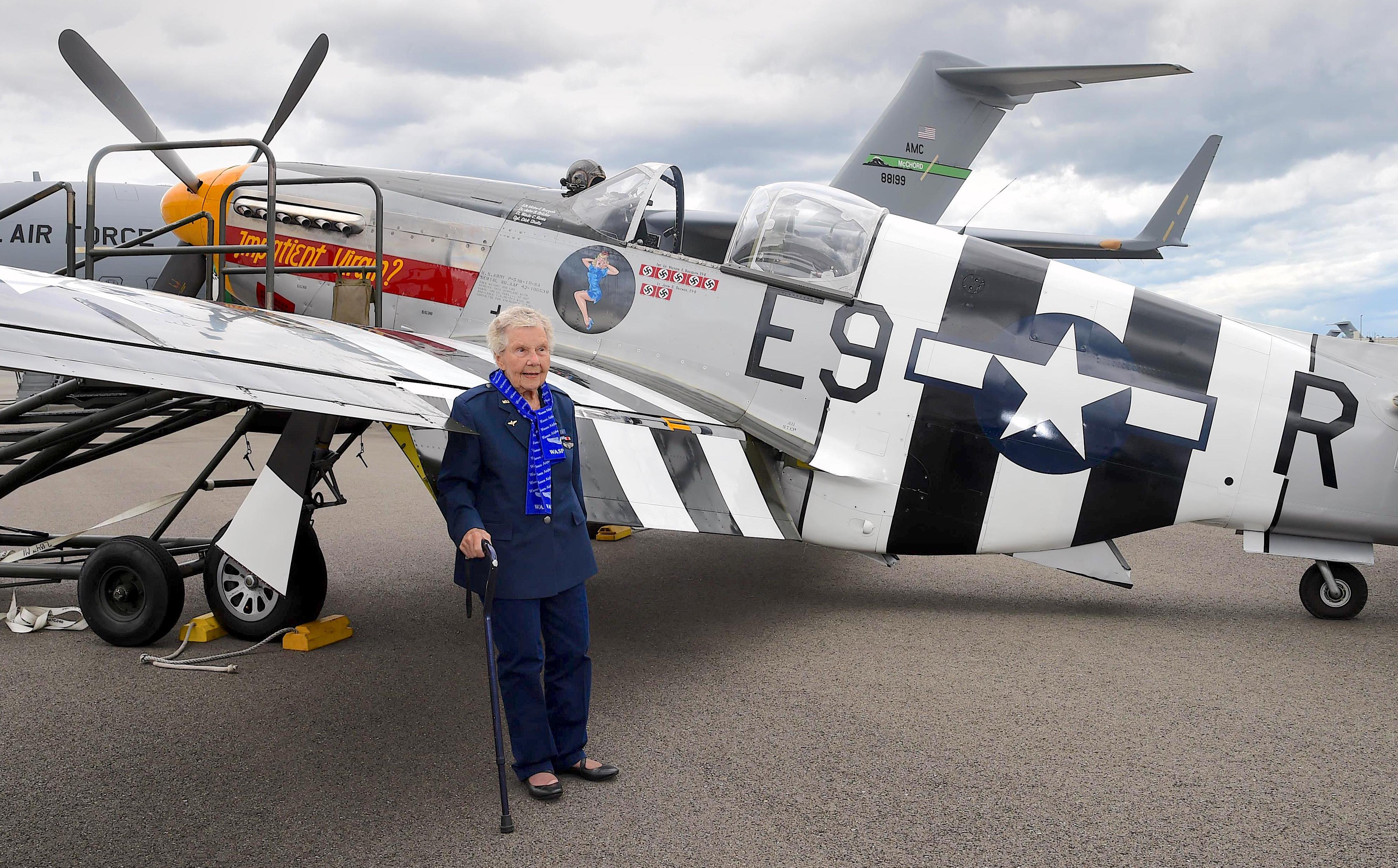
Olsen in front of a P-51 at a 2016 airshow.

In September 1942, the Women's Auxiliary Ferrying Squadron was formed, led by Nancy Harkness Love. The squadron recruited women who already held commercial pilot licenses with an average of 1,100 hours flying experience, to ferry military aircraft without the need for any additional training. In the same month, the Women's Flying Training Detachment was created under the leadership of Jacqueline Cochran. This group took less experienced women pilots and provided them with additional training to fly military aircraft, comparable to the Army Air Forces Training Command's cadet curriculum. In the summer of 1943, (Note: One source says July, another says August.) these two units were merged to form the Woman Airforce Service Pilots (WASPs). WASPs took non-combat flying jobs as civil service employees, including flight instruction, towing gliders and gunnery practice targets, performing engineering test flights, and aircraft ferrying.

Olsen joined the WASPs in 1943. A small woman, 5 feet (1.52 m) tall, Olsen embarked on a weight-gaining regimen based on bananas and malted milk to make the 100-pound (45 kg) required minimum. There were more than 25,000 applicants to the program, of whom fewer than 1,900 (Note: Sources differ on the exact number, reporting either 1,830 or 1,879.) were accepted and 1,074 graduated; Olsen was one of 152 students in class 43–4. Her training began in February 1943, at Houston Municipal Field (renamed William P. Hobby Airport in 1967) where half of her class was stationed; the other half reported to Avenger Field in Sweetwater, Texas. Applicants had to pay their own travel expenses to get to the training camps, as well as covering lodging expenses and purchasing dress uniforms. The initial training was in the Fairchild PT-19, progressing to the Vultee BT-13, the North American AT-6, and finally to the twin-engine Beechcraft AT-11.

Olsen initially hated her training, but she stayed with the program to avoid the embarrassment of dropping out. In a 2010 interview, she recollected crowded housing, insects, and poor weather that made the conditions "pretty primitive". She encountered difficulties when her fiancé died of spinal meningitis; taking time off to attend his funeral put her behind the rest of her class. Despite being sick with a cold on her return, she passed a checkride that included aerobatic maneuvers, allowing her to stay with her class although she struggled to catch up. She graduated on August 7, 1943, and was assigned to the Sixth Ferrying Group in Long Beach, California. She later said:

I was so lucky, 'cause I wouldn't have gotten Long Beach if I'd been held back. Long Beach was the base that was the key to the fighters. I would have been heartbroken if I hadn't gotten Long Beach.

Olsen credited Jacqueline Cochran, the director of the WASP, with providing an opportunity to keep women pilots flying during World War II. Olsen flew 61 missions for the U.S. Army Air Corps, delivering brand new planes with less than a half hour of flight time on them from the factory. She was one of only 12 women certified for night flight. A typical assignment for Olsen was to ferry a P-38 or P-51 from Long Beach to Newark, New Jersey, then get a military transport flight to Niagara Falls, New York, where she would pick up a Bell P-63 for delivery to Great Falls, Montana, and then return to Long Beach for another trip. These were all single-seat fighters, with the P-38 being twin-engine, the P-51 and P-63 single engine.

Olsen took a pair of good shoes with her on ferry flights so she could go on dancing dates with men at her destination before having to take off on her next flight. She often left her name and address in the cockpits of planes she had ferried, to be found later by the combat pilots, a practice shared by other WASPs. Two such combat pilots sent replies. One, a lieutenant, wrote "I thought I'd write a few lines to let you know that despite the fact that a woman once flew it, the ship performs perfectly and is apparently without flaws of any kind". WASPs were not considered military personnel; Olsen is listed in the Sixth Ferrying Group yearbook with the title of "Civilian Pilot". When the WASP program ended in 1944, the pilots were discharged at their home bases but with no transportation allowance to get back home. WASPs were retroactively granted veteran status as part of the GI Bill Improvement Act of 1977.

According to Olsen, she flew more than 20 different models of military aircraft, both Army and Navy types. Her favorite was the P-51. Debbie Jennings, a historian with the Seattle Museum of Flight, said Olsen disliked flying bombers because in the single-seat fighters, "she was by herself and could do whatever she wanted". Jennings mentioned that Olsen enjoyed scaring farmers on their tractors by flying close to them and "would do the same at railroad stations just because". For these actions, she was reprimanded by her superiors. According to her son, "She felt bombers were like driving buses". Her daughter noted that Olsen felt the P-38 was "an old woman's plane", which "anybody could fly", but a pilot had to "stay on top of" the P-51.

== After the war ==
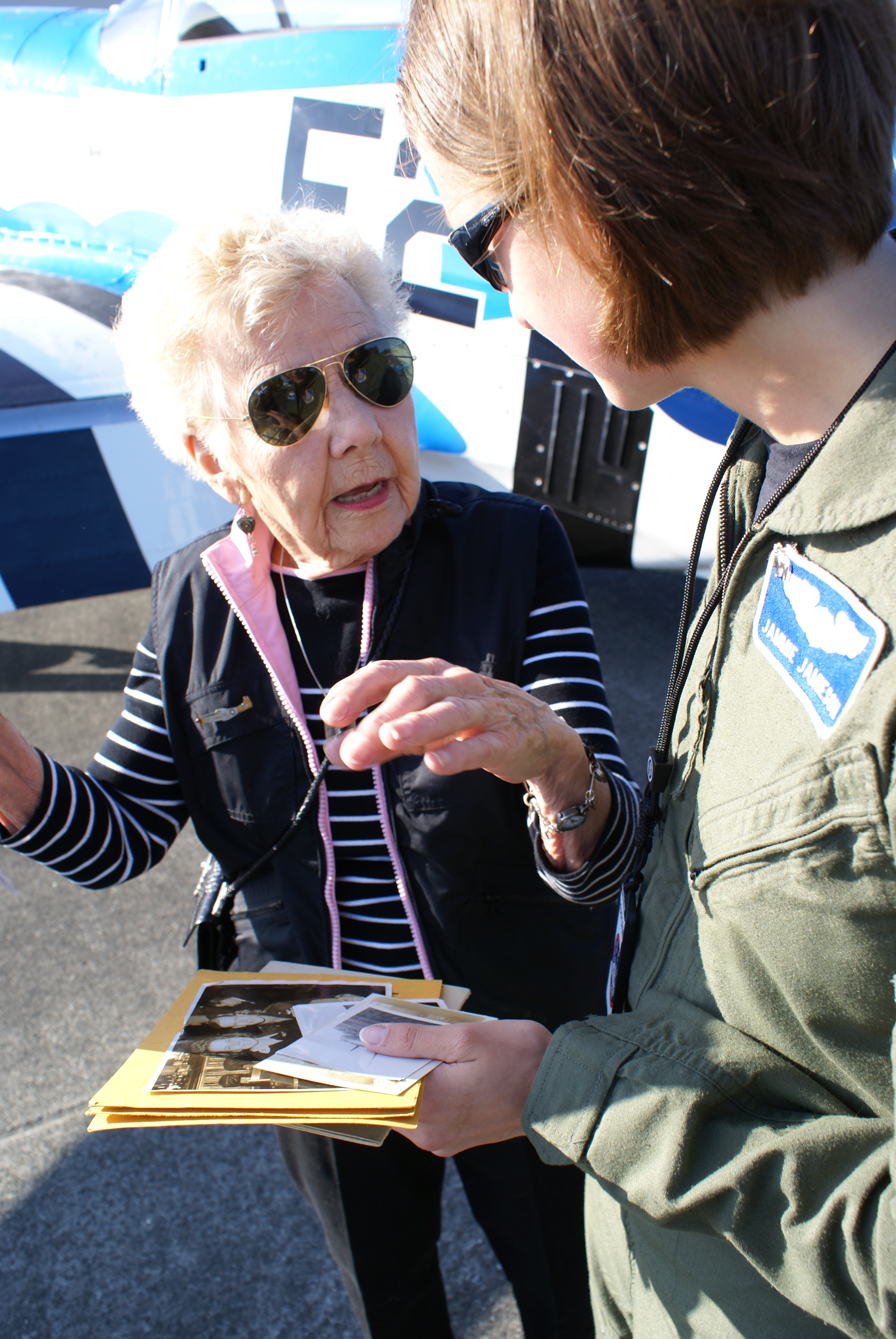
Dorothy Olsen meets with F-22 pilot Capt. Jammie Jamieson at McChord AFB in 2008 (U.S. Air Force photo).

After the war, Kocher married Harold W. Olsen of the Washington State Police Department, and they moved to University Place, Washington. The couple had a daughter, Julie (Stranburg), and a son, Kim; after raising them, she ran antique shops. Nerve damage from a dental procedure left her deaf for many years, but at the age of 80 she received cochlear implants that restored her hearing.

Olsen never flew commercially after the war, and never flew at all after having children. She is quoted as saying, "Why would I want to fly a Cessna when I've flown a P-51?" In 2009, Olsen (along with her fellow WASPs) was awarded the Congressional Gold Medal to commemorate her service. In 2015, she was honored with a flyover of Seattle's Boeing Field by vintage aircraft for her 99th birthday. In 2016, Olsen celebrated her 100th birthday at Joint Base Lewis–McChord. Also in attendance were fellow WASPs Alta Thomas, Betty Dybbro, and Mary Jean Sturdevant.

Olsen died on July 23, 2019, at her home in University Place, Washington, aged 103. She was given military honors at her funeral. Olsen was one of the last 38 WASPs still alive. Her husband Harold died in 2006.
