= Jamie Raines =

British YouTuber (born 1994)

Jamie Lotun-Raines
- Born: 19 February 1994 (age 32); Colchester, Essex, England
- Education: University of Essex (MSc, PhD)
- Occupations: Psychologist; YouTube personality
- Spouse: Shaaba Lotun-Raines (m. 2022)

YouTube information
- Channel: Jammidodger
- Years active: 2011–present
- Genres: LGBTQIA+; commentary; lifestyle and Inclusivity activist
- Subscribers: 1.17 million
- Views: 323.6 million
- Last updated: 20:30, 22 October 2025 (UTC)
- Website: shaabaandjamie.com

Jamie Anthony Lotun-Raines (born 19 February 1994) is an English YouTuber, LGBTQ activist, psychologist, and author. His videos include commentary on gender identity and other LGBTQ+ issues, as well as general lifestyle topics. Raines is a trans man and has documented his gender transition, including the effects of hormone replacement therapy and gender reassignment surgery. His channel, Jammidodger, has over one million subscribers.

== Early life and education ==
Jamie Anthony Lotun-Raines (Note: Archived at Ghostarchive and the Wayback Machine: Raines, Jamie (7 October 2015). FTM transgender: How I Chose my Name. YouTube (Video).) was born 19 February 1994, and is from Colchester in Essex. He attended St Mary's School in Colchester, and later Colchester Sixth Form College.

Raines recalls feeling like a boy from the age of four, and that he chose to express himself in masculine ways from an early age. At the age of 16, he realized he was transgender after watching a documentary involving a trans man and relating to their shared experiences. He describes his family and close friends as being immediately supportive and choosing the name Jamie with their help. In order to document the physical changes he underwent during his transition, Raines took a photograph of himself each day for three years. Raines has a master's degree and earned a PhD in Psychology from the University of Essex in 2021.

== Career ==
=== Social media ===
Raines started the YouTube channel Jammidodger in 2011. The title is a reference to his name and to Jammie Dodgers, a popular type of biscuit in the UK. Having found YouTube videos to be a useful resource when discovering his own gender identity, he started the channel to provide a UK perspective on the transition process as well as to document the process for himself.

Over time the channel has evolved to cover broader LGBT+ issues and also more general lifestyle content such as reacting to internet memes and subreddits, and reviewing cat toys. Raines was prominent among the many YouTubers to make videos criticising the views about trans people expressed by J. K. Rowling. In 2020, both Raines and his wife, Shaaba Lotun, made videos as part of Southend Council's Protect Your Fam project to encourage social distancing, hand-washing and mask wearing during the COVID-19 pandemic.

In addition to frequently appearing in videos with his wife, Shaaba, Raines has made videos collaborating with other YouTubers such as Jessica Kellgren-Fozard and Noahfinnce. Raines has a significant audience on both Instagram, with 338,000 followers, and Twitter, with 47,400 followers. Raines more frequently uploads to Instagram, using story and grid posts to share information about upcoming videos and projects, as well as general daily life. Raines and Lotun began livestreaming together on Twitch in April 2020, playing video games while talking with viewers.

=== Research and writing ===
Raines has conducted research into the sexual response of transgender men, as well as other topics related to gender and sexuality.

Raines' first book, The T in LGBT: Everything you need to know about being trans, was released on 30 June 2023, published by Ebury Publishing's Vermilion imprint. An audiobook is also scheduled for release by Penguin Random House Audio, with narration by Raines and Lotun.

== Reception ==
Raines' series of daily selfies, which he took during three years of his gender transition, were compiled into a 20-second montage for the Channel 4 television documentary Girls To Men. (Note: Channel 4 Entertainment (8 October 2015). "Girls To Men - Jamie's Transgender Transmission Timelapse". YouTube. Archived from the original on 7 May 2021.) Raines was featured in the Channel 4 documentary series Bride and Prejudice covering the tensions within Lotun's family in the run up to their engagement.

=== Awards ===
In 2020, Raines was a finalist in the LGBTQ+ Account section at the 12th Shorty Awards. In 2022, he won the Online Influencer award at the British LGBT Awards.

== Personal life ==
Raines is married to fellow YouTuber Shaaba Lotun-Raines (née Lotun). Both are bisexual. The two met in a college art class and became close friends prior to Raines' transition. When Raines came out, Lotun's family initially disapproved of their relationship, but eventually grew to support the couple's relationship. They then attended university together and both now hold PhDs. Each makes semi-regular appearances on the other's YouTube channel.

Raines received his Gender Recognition Certificate late in 2019, which allows him to be recognised as a man in marriage. He describes this as marking the end of his transition process. The couple had initially planned to marry in 2020 but they chose to delay the wedding due to COVID-19 travel restrictions, which would have prevented members of Lotun's Mauritian extended family from attending, eventually marrying in 2022.
