= Jamey =

Jamey is a given name. Notable people with the name include:

- Jamey Aebersold (born 1939), American jazz saxophonist and music educator
- Jamey Bowen (born 1969), former lacrosse player
- Jamey Carroll (born 1974), American professional baseball infielder
- Jamey Chadwell (born 1977), the head football coach at Delta State University
- Jamey Driscoll (born 1986), professional American Cyclocross and road racing cyclist
- Jamey Gambrell (1954–2020), American translator of Russian literature
- Jamey Grosser, former professional Supercross racer and current serial entrepreneur originally from Minnesota
- Jamey Haddad (born 1952), American percussionist in jazz and world music, specializing in hand drums
- Jamey Heath, political activist in Ontario, Canada
- Jamey Jasta (born 1977), American musician and vocalist from New Haven, Connecticut
- Jamey Jewells (born 1989), Team Canada athlete, women's wheelchair basketball
- Jamey Johnson (born 1975), American Grammy Award nominated country music artist
- Jamey Mosley (born 1995), American football player
- Jamey Richard (born 1984), American football center
- Jamey Rootes, American sports executive
- Jamey Scott, musical composer for film, television, and video games
- Jamey Sheridan (born 1951), American actor
- Jamey Wright (born 1974), American professional baseball pitcher

== See also ==
- Suicide of Jamey Rodemeyer (1997–2011), openly bisexual teenager
- Jaimie (disambiguation)
- Jaymay
- James (disambiguation)
- Jamie
- Jim (disambiguation)
- Jimbo (disambiguation)
- Jimmy (disambiguation)
- Jaimee (disambiguation)
