= Jaimes =

Jaimes is the Spanish equivalent of James.

== Surname ==
- Bartolomé Jaimes (1522–1603), Spanish nobleman and conquistador
- Brenden Jaimes (born 1999), American football player
- Fabián Jaimes (born 1992), Mexican basketball player
- José Jaimes García (born 1952), Mexican politician
- Laureano Jaimes (born 1961), Venezuelan footballer
- Ricardo Jaimes Freyre (1868–1933), Peruvian-Bolivian poet
- Sam Jaimes (born 1934), American animator
- Sole Jaimes (born 1989), Argentine footballer
- Ulises Jaimes (born 1996), Mexican footballer

== Given name ==
- Jaimes McKee (born 1987), English-born Hong Kong footballer

== See also ==
- Jaime
- James (disambiguation)
