= A Hobo's Christmas =

1987 television film directed by Will Mackenzie

- Print advertisement
- Genre: Drama
- Written by: Joe Byrne; Jeb Rosebrook
- Directed by: Will Mackenzie
- Starring: Barnard Hughes; Gerald McRaney; Wendy Crewson; William Hickey; Harley Cross; Helen Stenborg
- Theme music composer: Mark Snow
- Country of origin: United States
- Original language: English

Production
- Executive producer: Joe Byrne
- Producer: Paul Freeman
- Production location: Salt Lake City
- Cinematography: Stephen W. Gray
- Editor: Corky Ehlers
- Running time: 94 minutes
- Production companies: Joe Byrne/Falrose Productions; Phoenix Entertainment Group

Original release
- Network: CBS
- Release: December 6, 1987

A Hobo's Christmas is a 1987 American made-for-television drama film directed by Will Mackenzie and produced by Joe Byrne and Paul Freeman for CBS. The screenplay was written by Joe Byrne and Jeb Rosebrook. The film stars Barnard Hughes, Gerald McRaney, Wendy Crewson, William Hickey, Harley Cross, Helen Stenborg, Lee Weaver, and Jamie Sorrentini.

== Plot ==
After abandoning his family in Pittsburgh 25 years prior, Chance (a hobo) decides it's time to go home.

Drifting from place to place, Chance finds himself in Salt Lake City, where his now adult son lives with his two children. However, his son (still resenting the fact that Chance ran out on his family 25 years earlier), gives Chance only one day with his grandkids; after that, he's expected to leave and never come back. Meanwhile, Chance's friends warn him that his son and the past are memories that are best left alone, and should leave, but he has to find out for himself.

== Cast ==
- Barnard Hughes as Chance
- Gerald McRaney as Charlie
- Wendy Crewson as Laurie
- William Hickey as Cincinnati Harold
- Harley Cross as Bobby Grovner
- Helen Stenborg as Mrs. Gladys Morgan
- Michael Flynn as Priest
- Lee Weaver as Biloxi Slim
- Jamie Sorrentini as Kathy Grovner
- Michael Rudd as Omaha John Boswell
- Logan Field as Lt. Nielsen
- Alan Gregory as Desk Clerk
- Laura Hughes as Carolina Blue
- Dana Cutrer as Cajun
- Donré Sampson as Desk Sergeant

== Production ==
Parts of the film were shot in Salt Lake City, Utah.

== See also ==
- List of Christmas films
