= Jamie Lee =

Jamie Lee may refer to:

- Jamie Lee (comedian), American comedian, writer, and actress
- Jamie Lee (cricketer), New Zealand cricketer
- Jamie Lee (Gaelic footballer), Irish sportsman

== See also ==
- Lee (English surname)
