= Jaime King (academic) =

American law professor

Academic background
- Thesis: The regulation of individual autonomy in medical decision-making (2008)

Jaime Staples King is an American law academic, and is the John and Marylyn Mayo Chair in Health Law and Professor of Law at the University of Auckland, specialising in medical law and policy.

== Academic career ==
King completed a Bachelor of Arts at Dartmouth College in 1998, followed by a J.D. at Emory University in 2001. Her 2008 PhD dissertation at Harvard University was titled The regulation of individual autonomy in medical decision-making. King held the Bion M. Gregory Chair of Business Law at the University of California Hastings College of the Law. King's appointment to the law faculty at the University of Auckland was announced in early 2020, but she worked remotely from taking up the position in July until early the following year, due to the need to go through quarantine for COVID 19.

King's research covers the interaction of law and medicine, and how health policy can influence people's lives. She is interested in access and equity issues, including healthcare costs and pricing transparency, and has researched medical decision-making and genetic testing. She has commented on how the wording of New Zealand law around advertising of therapeutics in the Therapeutic Products Bill would need to be precise to avoid preventing patients from fundraising for medicines.

King has testified before members of the US House of Representatives, and served on a Technical Expertise Panel for the US Department of Health and Human Services. She has been a board member and President of the Board of the American Society of Law, Medicine, and Ethics.

== Selected works ==
- Annette M O'Connor; John E Wennberg; Légaré, France; Hilary A Llewellyn-Thomas; Benjamin W Moulton; Karen R Sepucha; Andrea G Sodano; King, Jaime (2007). "Toward the 'tipping point': decision aids and informed patient choice". Health Affairs. 26 (3): 716–725. doi:10.1377/hlthaff.26.3.716. PMID 17485749. Wikidata Q34626219.
- King, Jaime; Benjamin W Moulton (2006). "Rethinking informed consent: the case for shared medical decision-making". American Journal of Law & Medicine. 32 (4): 429–501. doi:10.1177/009885880603200401. PMID 17240730. Wikidata Q79617754.
- Benjamin Moulton; King, Jaime (2010). "Aligning ethics with medical decision-making: the quest for informed patient choice". The Journal of Law. 38 (1): 85–97. doi:10.1111/j.1748-720x.2010.00469.x. PMID 20446987. Wikidata Q48820433.
- M A Allyse; L C Sayres; M Havard; et al. (2013). "Best ethical practices for clinicians and laboratories in the provision of noninvasive prenatal testing". Prenatal Diagnosis. 33 (7): 656–661. doi:10.1002/pd.4144. PMC 4057377. PMID 23613322. Wikidata Q33754305.
- King, Jaime; Benjamin Moulton (2013). "Group Health's participation in a shared decision-making demonstration yielded lessons, such as role of culture change". Health Affairs. 32 (2): 294–302. doi:10.1377/hlthaff.2012.1067. PMID 23381522. Wikidata Q43576718.
- Megan Allyse; Lauren C Sayres; King, Jaime; Mary E Norton; Mildred K Cho (2012). "Cell-free fetal DNA testing for fetal aneuploidy and beyond: clinical integration challenges in the US context". Human Reproduction. 27 (11): 3123–3131. doi:10.1093/humrep/des286. PMC 3472618. PMID 22863603. Wikidata Q36321452.
- King, Jaime; Mark H Eckman; Benjamin W Moulton (2011). "The potential of shared decision making to reduce health disparities". The Journal of Law. 39 Suppl 1 (S1): 30–33. doi:10.1111/j.1748-720x.2011.00561.x. PMID 21309892. Wikidata Q46196718.
