= Rafael Galindo Jaime =

Mexican politician

- Born: 18 December 1952 (age 73); Sonora, Mexico
- Occupation: Politician
- Political party: PRI

Rafael Galindo Jaime (born 18 December 1952) is a Mexican politician affiliated with the Institutional Revolutionary Party. As of 2014 he served as Deputy of the LIX Legislature of the Mexican Congress as a plurinominal representative.
