= Jamie Beck =

American photographer and author

- Born: March 2, 1983 (age 43)
- Education: Fashion Institute of Technology
- Occupations: Photographer; author

Jamie Beck (born March 2, 1983) is an American photographer and author of the 2022 book An American in Provence. Beck is best known, with her husband Kevin Burg, for co-creating the Cinemagraph, and also for her work and life in Provence; including her Isolation Creation series.

Beck studied and began her career in New York City working for brands including Armani, Cartier, Chanel, Disney, and Google.

== Early life and education ==
Beck grew up in the Dallas-Fort Worth, Texas area and moved to New York City to attend the Fashion Institute of Technology where she studied analog photography.

== Career ==
Beck began her career by assisting photographers, editors and doing freelance work for fashion houses and independent designers. With her husband Kevin Burg she opened Ann Street Studio and operated the Tumblr page From Me to You. In 2011 Beck and Burg created the cinemagraph and worked at the New York Fashion Week and other major brands.

After moving to France, Beck began shooting everyday objects and self-portraits in her studio in Apt, where she created her Provençal Self Portrait series. During the COVID-19 pandemic, Beck created a series called Isolation Creation which featured members of her online community. The series incorporated one photograph per day of lockdown and was shared via Instagram stories. Her images, influenced by the weather, a feeling or current event, would display a creation that would capture the beauty that was true of the day. Beck sold the images in her online shop with funds raised to go to Foundation for Contemporary Arts' COVID-19 Emergency Grants Fund.

Her book An American in Provence was released in November 2022 and published by Simon and Schuster.
