= Jamie Marich =

Croatian-American trauma specialist, author and expressive artist

Jamie Marich is a trauma therapist, author, researcher, educator, singer-songwriter, producer, and advocate. She is best known for her work as a trainer in eye movement desensitization and reprocessing (EMDR) and for disclosing her own mental history with a dissociative disorder. She also developed an approach to conscious dance called Dancing Mindfulness, and wrote a book of the same name.

== Early life ==
Marich was born in Youngstown, Ohio to parents who met in Croatian folklore groups. Marich performed in the same group that her mother did as a young child, and she was also active in figure skating and theatre.

Marich grew up attending a Catholic parish and elementary school, while also attending an Assemblies of God church. Her father converted to this evangelical movement when she was very young. She writes about the spiritual trauma experienced in this religious upbringing in You Lied To Me About God: A Memoir.

Jamie Marich attended Youngstown State University for her undergraduate studies where she was a University Scholar. She graduated from Chaney High School in Youngstown in 1997.

Marich lived in Bosnia and Herzegovina from 2000 to 2003 where she worked with various humanitarian aid and parish projects connected to the parish of Medjugorje. As of 2022, Marich is a Croatian citizen.

== Career ==
Marich is based in Ohio and travels internationally, speaking on topics related to Eye Movement Desensitization and Reprocessing (EMDR) therapy, trauma, addiction, expressive arts and mindfulness. She completed her doctoral dissertation on the use of EMDR therapy with addiction.

Marich is the founder of The Institute for Creative Mindfulness and its publishing and media arm, Creative Mindfulness Media.

She is the winner of the 2015 President's Award from NALGAP: The Association of Gay, Lesbian, Bisexual, Transgender Addiction Professionals and Their Allies. She is the winner of the 2019 EMDR Advocacy Award from the EMDR International Association.

Marich refers to herself as an expressive artist to define her connection to creative projects. She directed I Wanted to Write You a Think Piece (2021), served as a consulting producer and on-call trauma therapist on the short film Garage (2021), a co-producer of the short film Silk (2022), and was featured as herself in the documentary Stop Breathe Let Go (2018). She is a performing singer-songwriter and records music.

== Personal life ==
Marich is bisexual.

She is in active recovery from alcohol and opiates.

Marich has two stepchildren who she calls her "bonus boys" from a marriage that she is no longer in.

== Publications ==
- —— (2024). You Lied to Me About God: A Memoir. North Atlantic Books. ISBN 9798889840442.
- —— (2023). Dissociation Made Simple: A Stigma-Free Guide to Embracing Your Dissociative Mind and Navigating Daily Life. North Atlantic Books. ISBN 9781623177218.
- ——; Pirkl, Anna (2022). Transforming Trauma with Jiu-Jitsu: A Guide for Survivors, Therapists, and Jiu-Jitsu Practitioners to Facilitate Embodied Recovery. Berkeley, CA: North Atlantic Books. ISBN 9781623176150.
- ——; Dansiger, Stephen (2021). Healing Addiction with EMDR Therapy: A Trauma-Focused Guide. Springer. ISBN 9780826136060.
- —— (2020). Trauma and the 12 Steps, Revised and Expanded. ISBN 9781623174682.
- —— (2019). Process Not Perfection: Expressive Arts Solutions for Trauma Recovery. Warren, OH: Crative Mindfulness Media.
- ——; Dansiger, Stephen (2018). EMDR Therapy and Mindfulness for Trauma-Focused Care. New York: Springer. ISBN 9780826149145.
- —— (2015). Dancing Mindfulness: A Creative Path to Healing and Transformation. Skylight Paths. ISBN 9781683360216.
- —— (2013). Trauma Made Simple: Competencies in Assessment, Treatment, and Working with Survivors. PESI Publishing. ISBN 9781936128921.
- —— (2012). EMDR Made Simple: 4 Approaches to Using EMDR with Every Client. PESI Publishing. ISBN 9781936128068.

== Discography ==
- Give Us Your Peace/Daruj nam mir (2002)
- Under My Roof (2004)
- Grace of a Woman (2012)
- You Lied to Me About God (2024)
