= Jamie Sorrentini =

American actress

- Born: New Jersey, United States
- Other names: Jamie Perez Sorrentini, Jamie Mills
- Occupation: Actress
- Years active: 1987 - present
- Website: http://jamiesorrentini.com/

Jamie Sorrentini (also known as Jamie Perez Sorrentini and Jamie Mills) is an American film, television and theatre actress. She starred as Kathy Grovner in the 1987 television movie A Hobo's Christmas. Sorrentini was a cast member during the 2000 United States tour of the 1999 musical Parade. In 2002, she performed in the play Birdie's Bachelorette Party, and appeared on the television program Law & Order: Special Victims Unit.

== Early life and education ==
Sorrentini was born in New Jersey, and began acting in advertisements at the age of seven. She performed off-Broadway with actor Tom Hulce in a production of the play about author Lewis Carroll, titled Haddock's Eyes. Sorrentini studied acting, art history and photography at New York University's Tisch School of the Arts. She attended the Lee Strasberg Theatre and Film Institute program. Sorrentini graduated with a B.F.A. degree from New York University.

== Career ==
Sorrentini starred as Kathy Grovner in the 1987 television movie A Hobo's Christmas. In a review of the movie for The State, Ray Benson singled out Sorrentini's performance. In 2000, Sorrentini appeared in a Harold Prince-directed production of the 1999 Tony Award-winning musical Parade, as part of a U.S. national tour. She was a cast member of the play Birdy's Bachelorette Party in 2001 and 2002. Birdy's Bachelorrette Party received positive reception from Barbara & Scott Siegel in a review in Theatremania. In 2002, Sorrentini portrayed Vincenza Agosto on the television program Law & Order: Special Victims Unit.

== Personal life ==
She is married to singer and musician Tiziano Lugli, and both are former members of the Church of Scientology.

== Filmography ==
=== Film ===
Year	Film	Role	Director	Notes
2006	Big Top	Val	J.P. Mulero	
2007	You're So Dead	Selma	Norman Thaddeus Vane	
2009	Inside	Girlfriend	Tracie Laymon	

=== Television ===
Year	Title	Role	Director	Notes
1987	A Hobo's Christmas	Kathy Grovner	Will Mackenzie	TV movie; credited as Jamie Mills
1988	Steampipe Alley	Self, vocal guest	Mario Cantone	Ep. # 1.13
1990	The Baby-Sitters Club	Patti	Noel Black	Ep. # 1.1; credited as Jamie Mills
2002	Law & Order: Special Victims Unit	Vincenza Agosto	Michael Fields	Ep. # 4.4
2004	The Sopranos	Mimi	David Chase	Ep. # 5.1, 5.5
2004	NYPD Blue	Angela	Mark Tinker	Ep. # 12.3
2005	Numb3rs	Stacy Manning	Alex Zakrzewski	Ep. # 2.1
2006	Las Vegas	Krystal	David Solomon	Ep. # 4.2
2009	House M.D.	Stripper	Greg Yaitanes	Ep. # 5.22
2009	General Hospital	Woman	Phideaux Xavier	Ep. # 1.11807
2009	CSI: Miami	Maria Guzman	Larry Detwiler	Ep. # 8.4
2010	It's Always Sunny in Philadelphia	Slutty Woman	Randall Einhorn	Ep. 6.6
2010	Desperate Housewives	Ramona	David Grossman	Ep. # 6.20

== See also ==
- "Epiphany" (Desperate Housewives)
- Lists of actresses
- List of American film actresses
