= Jamie Isenstein =

American artist

Jamie Isenstein is an American artist.

== Work ==
Jamie Isenstein works in sculpture, drawing, and performance. In conversation with Friday Arts on the occasion of the 2025 exhibition Body / Body / Body, in which her work was shown alongside Fabienne Lasserre and Sophy Naess, Isenstein stated: "My work has always grappled with political questions, especially work that uses disembodied body parts. When I use my own body, or now other people’s—sometimes it's a hand or feet or a leg—there's this question of subject and object. Am I the subject or have I become an object? There are questions of power. Am I going to be the object and be the thing that power is acted upon, or am I making an object into a subject that has some sort of agency?"

Isenstein has received numerous reviews and mentions in the art press. Her work has been described by art critic Roberta Smith as "cryptic and light, with an undertow of sorrow." The critic David Velasco described her signature as "sculptures that use parts of her own living body as material".

== Selected exhibitions ==
=== Solo exhibitions ===
- Home Theater, Lullin + Ferrari Gallery, Zurich, CH, 2023
- Jamie Isenstein: Infinite Expansion of the Rubber Band Mansion, The Institute of Contemporary Art, University of Tennessee, Chattanooga, 2022
- Spectacle, Gluck50, Milan, Italy, 2017
- Head Space, Crisp-Ellert Art Museum, Flagler College, St. Augustine, FL, 2017
- Jamie Isenstein: Infinite Invisible Soft-Shoe, special presentation in conjunction with Collected By Thea Westreich Wagner and Ethan Wagner, The Whitney Museum of American Art, New York City, NY, 2016
- Para Drama, Andrew Kreps Gallery, New York City, NY, 2015
- Jamie Isenstein: “ “ Visual Arts Center, University of Texas, Austin, TX, 2011
- Hammer Projects: Jamie Isenstein, This Way to the Egress Armand Hammer Museum of Art, Los Angeles, CA, 2007
- Acéphal Magical, Andrew Kreps Gallery, New York, NY, 2007

=== Group exhibitions ===
- Body / Body / Body, Friday Arts, New York, NY 2025
- Four Rooms: A Floating World, Lullin + Ferrari, Zurich, CH, 2022
- Illusions Are Real, Manif d’Art, La Biennale de Québec, curated by Steven Matijcio, Québec City, Québec, Canada, 2022

== Collections ==
- Museum of Modern Art
- Whitney Museum of American Art
- Hammer Museum
