= José Luis Jaime Correa =

Mexican politician

- Born: 18 February 1953 (age 73); State of Mexico, Mexico
- Occupation: Politician
- Political party: PRD

José Luis Jaime Correa (born 18 February 1953) is a Mexican politician from the Party of the Democratic Revolution. From 2009 to 2012 he served as Deputy of the LXI Legislature of the Mexican Congress representing the State of Mexico.
