= Juana Bonilla Jaime =

Mexican politician

- Born: 16 May 1961 (age 65); Miguel Hidalgo, D.F., Mexico
- Occupation: Deputy
- Political party: PRD

Juana Bonilla Jaime (born 16 May 1961) is a Mexican politician affiliated with the PRD. She currently serves as Deputy of the LXII Legislature of the Mexican Congress representing the State of Mexico.
