= Jamie Langston Turner =

American novelist (born 1949)

Jamie Langston Turner (born 1949) is a Christian novelist.

== Biography ==
Jamie Turner was born in Mississippi and taught writing and poetry at Bob Jones University. She has written eight novels: Suncatchers (1995), Some Wildflower in My Heart (1998), By the Light of a Thousand Stars (1999), A Garden to Keep (2001), No Dark Valley (2004), Winter Birds (2006), Sometimes a Light Surprises (2009), and To See the Moon Again (2014).

Her novel A Garden to Keep won a 2002 Christy Award; her Winter Birds was named one of the "one hundred best books" of 2006 by Publishers Weekly and also won a Christy Award. After Bethany House remaindered Winter Birds, Turner published her eighth novel, To See the Moon Again, with mainstream Berkley Books, an imprint of Penguin Random House. Turner's novels were "loosely conceived as a series" and are all set in three fictional towns near Greenville in Upstate South Carolina.
