= Jamie O'Hara =

Jamie O'Hara may refer to:

- Jamie O'Hara (footballer) (born 1986), English footballer
- Jamie O'Hara (singer) (1950–2021), American country singer

== See also ==
- James O'Hara (disambiguation)
