= Mercedes Chaves Jaime =

Colombian pedagogue

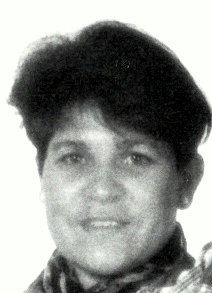
Mercedes Chaves Jaime 1956 - 2005

Mercedes Chaves Jaime (7 November 1956 La Uvita, Colombia - 22 August 2005 Tunja, Colombia) was a Colombian psycopedagogue, professor and educational researcher. Chaves established herself as a notable Vygotskian pedagogue in Latin America.

== Work ==
Her work extended to early childhood education and cognitive stages for child development in read/write processes. She was inspired by the work of the Soviet psychologist Lev Semyonovich Vygotsky, the founder of cultural-historical psychology.

Chaves was a proponent of the empty acts theory in children's learning processes. The theory argues that the relationship between teachers and students must be focused on Vygotsky's Zone of Proximal Development, in order to avoid negative interactions with other students, potencializing the ability to interpret, as a complex interaction between the text and the reader, the information symbols represent, and to be able to re-create those same symbols so that others students can derive the same meaning.

== Education and career ==
Mercedes Chaves attended the National Pedagogic and Technological University of Colombia in Tunja, studying early childhood education and getting a degree in Bachelor of Education. In 1993 Chaves founded the Lev Vygotsky Research Center and Private School, located in Tunja. In 1993 she went to Bogotá to finish her studies in Education at the Pontifical Xavierian University, receiving a Master of Arts in Education with honors. From 1994 to 2004, Chaves was an academic in the field of child psychopedagogy, teaching at the National Pedagogic and Technological University of Colombia.

== See also ==
- Creative Pedagogy
- Educational psychology
- Learning theory (education)
- Zone of Proximal Development
