= Jaymes =

Jaymes is a surname. Notable people with the surname include:

- Jessica Jaymes (1979–2019), American pornographic actress
- Christopher Jaymes, American television and film actor, director, screenwriter, and producer
- David Jaymes, English musician and songwriter
- Terry Jaymes, radio host

== See also ==
- Jaymes Mansfield, American drag queen
