= Jamie Hooyman =

American academic

Jamie Hooyman (born 1963) is an American academic and the first woman provost, or chief academic officer, of Northwest Missouri State University.

== Life ==
She earned her Doctor of Education in Applied Educational Studies with a focus in exercise science from Oklahoma State University in 2003 and her Master of Science in Education with a concentration in exercise physiology and fitness from Northern Illinois University. She also holds a Bachelor of Science in Education with a concentration in physical education from Missouri State University and an Associate of Arts degree.

In July 2016, she joined Northwest as vice provost and was appointed provost November 2017. Before being selected by Northwest, Hooyman was an administrator at North Central Missouri College, where she served as vice president of Institutional Effectiveness, Dean of Instruction, and associate dean. Before that, she was on faculty at University of Central Oklahoma in the Department of Kinesiology and Health studies, where she served as curriculum coordinator for recreation management and fitness management degrees.

== See also ==
- Academic administration
- Governance in higher education
