= Satyendra Singh Jamwal =

- In office 2009–2010

Personal details
- Born: 1959
- Died: 2010 (aged 50–51)
- Spouse: Geeta Jamwal
- Parent: Major-General Jagdish Singh Jamwal (retired).
- Occupation: Naval officer

Satyendra Singh Jamwal (1959 — 2010) was a former flag officer in the Indian Navy. He was serving as the Chief of Staff at the Southern Naval Command when he died in a tragic accidental shooting death in 2010. Standing 6 feet 4, “Jammy” - as he was called in the navy - belonged to the Chenani town of Udhampur district in Jammu and was an avid sportsman renowned for his handsome features.

== Naval Positioned held ==
A highly decorated officer he was being groomed to take over as the chief of the Indian Navy.Rear Admiral S S Jamwal was commissioned in the Executive Branch of the Indian Navy as a Surface Warfare Officer on 1 July 1980.

- ADC to the President of India.
- Naval Attache to Russia
- In-charge southern command Indian Navy.
- Commanding officer INS Delhi (D61).

== Alma Mater ==
- The Lawrence School, Sanawar.
- National Defence Academy.
- Grechko Naval War College in the then USSR.
- Defence Services Staff College at Wellington

== Controversy surrounding his death ==
Rear Admiral S S Jamwal was accidentally killed while examining a firearm at the INS Dronacharya in Kochi. The police investigation claimed that the death was a suicide. But the Navy said it was an accidental shooting.
