= Jámy =

- Municipality
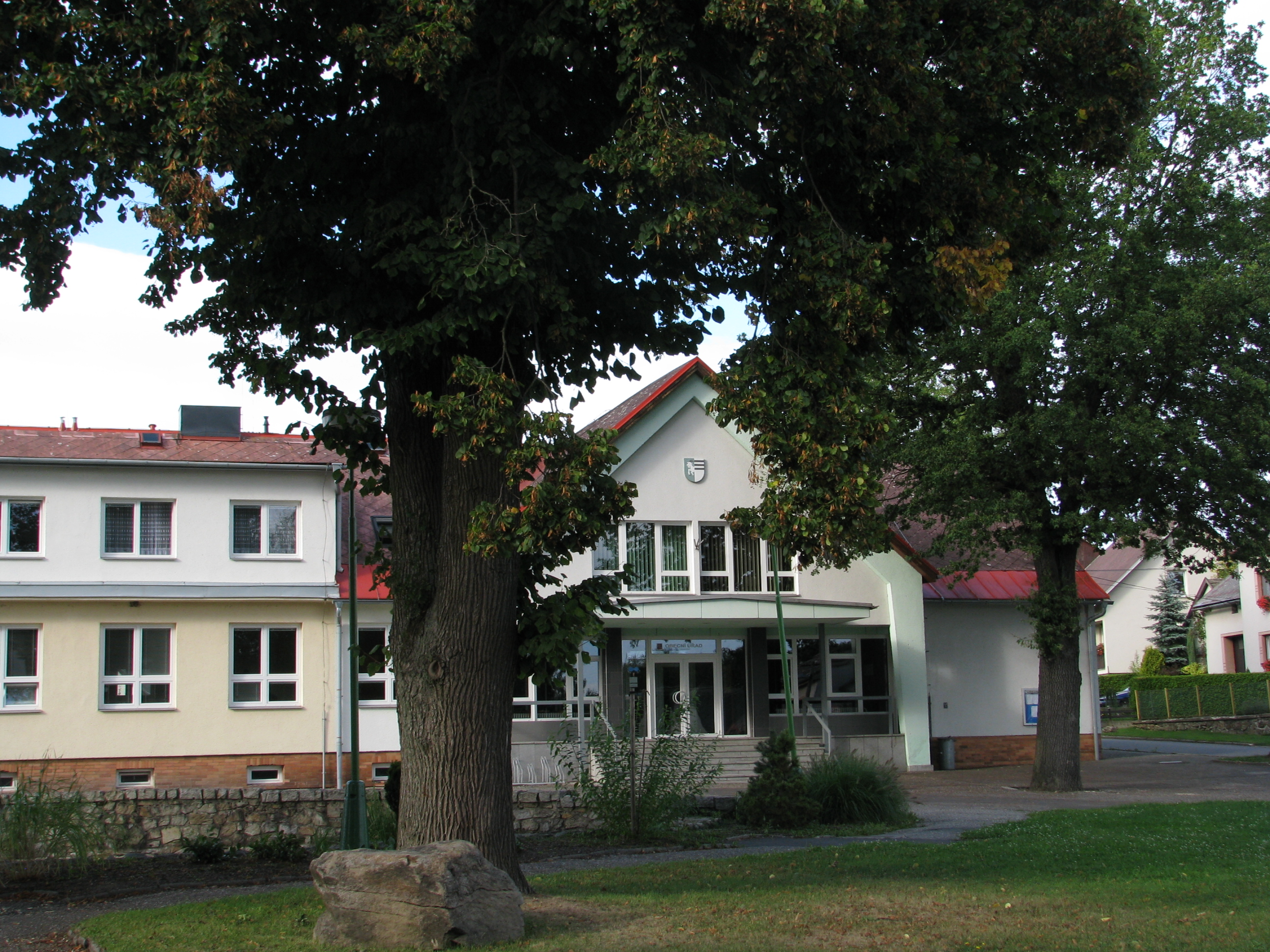
- Municipal office

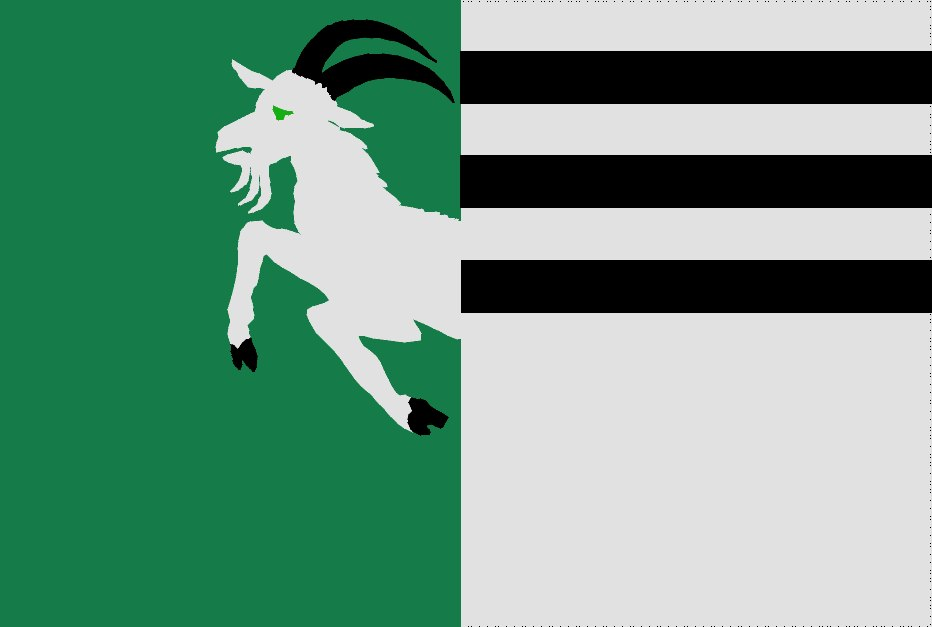
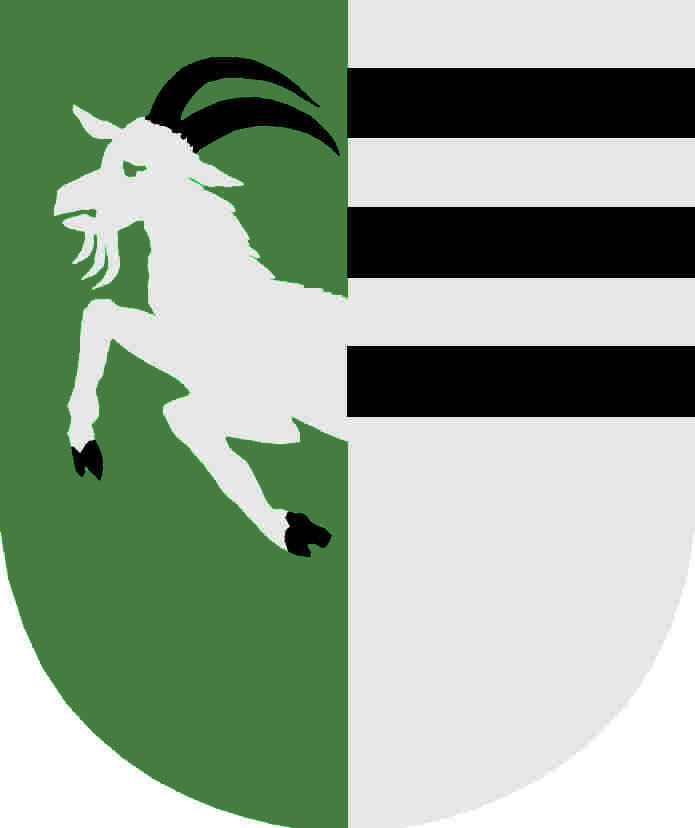
- Flag Coat of arms

- Location in the Czech Republic
- Coordinates: 49°31′49″N 16°0′22″E
- Country: Czech Republic
- Region: Vysočina
- District: Žďár nad Sázavou
- First mentioned: 1252

Area
  - Total: 12.39 km^{2} (4.78 sq mi)
- Elevation: 593 m (1,946 ft)

Population (2026-01-01)
  - Total: 655
  - Density: 52.9/km^{2} (137/sq mi)
- Time zone: UTC+1 (CET)
  - Summer (DST): UTC+2 (CEST)
- Postal code: 592 32
- Website: www.obec-jamy.cz

Jámy is a municipality and village in Žďár nad Sázavou District in the Vysočina Region of the Czech Republic. It has about 700 inhabitants.

== Etymology ==
The name Jámy literally means 'pits' in Czech.

== Geography ==
Ostrov nad Oslavou is located about 6 kilometres (4 mi) southeast of Žďár nad Sázavou and 33 km (21 mi) northeast of Jihlava. It lies in the Křižanov Highlands. The highest points are hills Vejdoch and Vrchy, both at 663 m (2,175 ft) above sea level. The Oslava River briefly flows along the southern municipal border. The stream Jamský potok originates here and supplies a system of small fishponds, before it joins the Oslava.

== History ==
The settlement probably existed in 1240, when Přibyslav of Křižanov acquired the area. The first written mention of Jámy is from 1252, when Přibyslav's son-in-law, Boček of Obřany, donated the settlement to the Žďár Monastery.

In 1888, a major fire devastated the municipality, leading to the establishment of a voluntary fire brigade the following year. In 1926, an agricultural distillery was built in the municipality.

== Demographics ==
Historical population

Year	Pop.	±%
1869	696	—
1880	687	−1.3%
1890	675	−1.7%
1900	696	+3.1%
1910	669	−3.9%

Year	Pop.	±%
1921	662	−1.0%
1930	678	+2.4%
1950	481	−29.1%
1961	548	+13.9%
1970	498	−9.1%

Year	Pop.	±%
1980	498	+0.0%
1991	524	+5.2%
2001	545	+4.0%
2011	581	+6.6%
2021	606	+4.3%

Source: Censuses

== Transport ==
Between 1953 and 1984, a railway station named Jámy was located approximately 2 kilometres (1 mi) west of the village. Following its closure, the nearest railway stop has been located about 3 kilometres (2 mi) north in Veselíčko.

== Sights ==
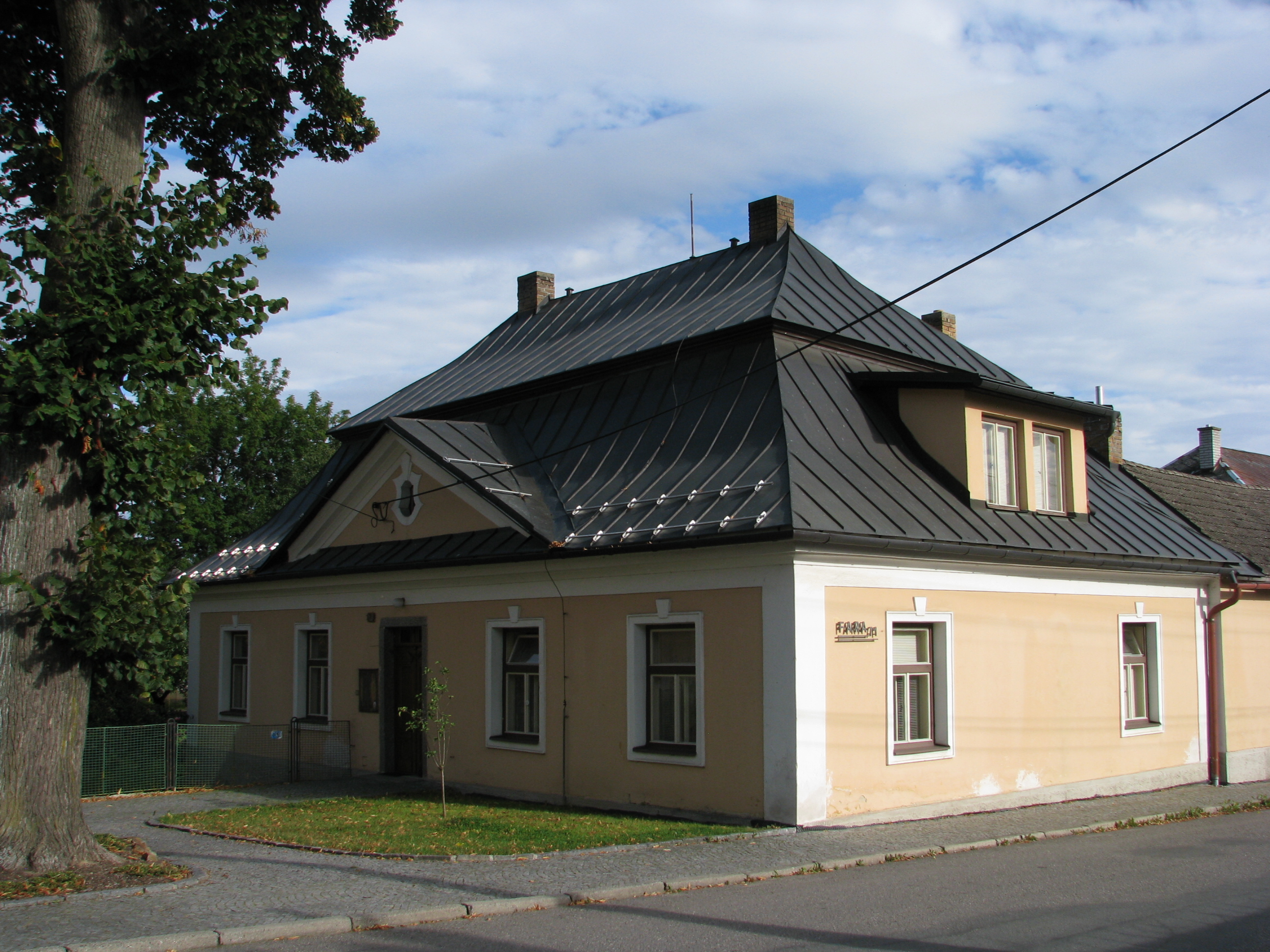
Rectory

There are two protected cultural monuments in Jámy, specifically a late Baroque rectory and a column shrine built in 1831.

The main landmark of the municipality is the Church of Saint Martin. It was built in 1792 on the site of an older church from the 17th century. It was reconstructed several times.
