= Jaimie =

Jaimie is an alternative spelling of Jamie and may refer to:

== People ==
- Jaimie Alexander (born 1984), American actress
- Jaimie Cloud, American sustainability educator and advocate
- Jaimie Dawson (born 1969), badminton player from Canada
- Jaimie Leonarder (born 1958), Australian musician, archivist, social worker, film critic, radio announcer, and DJ
- Jaimie Branch (born 1983), trumpeter playing jazz and improvisational music
- Jaimie D'Cruz, British documentary film producer and director
- Jaimie Thibeault (born 1989), Canadian female volleyball player
- Jaimie Leonard (died 2011), lieutenant colonel in the United States Army
- Jaimie Natsuki (born 1992), Japanese actress and tarento
- Jaimie Thomas (born 1986), American football guard
- Jaimie Warren (born 1980), American photographer and performance artist
- Jaimie Mantzel, inventor

== Media ==
- Jaimie McPheeters, a character from The Travels of Jaimie McPheeters and its TV series adaptation

== See also ==
- Jamey
- Jamie
- Jaimee (disambiguation)
