= Jamy =

Jamy may refer to:

== Places ==
- Jamy, Lublin Voivodeship, east Poland
- Jamy, Opole Voivodeship, south-west Poland
- Jamy, Podkarpackie Voivodeship, south-east Poland
- Jamy, Pomeranian Voivodeship, north Poland
- Jámy, Czech Republic

== People ==
- Jamy Franco (born 1991), Guatemalan race walker
- Jamy Gourmaud, French journalist
- Jamy Ian Swiss, American magician

== Characters ==
- Jamy, a Scottish soldier in Shakespeare's Henry V

== See also ==
- Jamie, a given name
