= Jaime Bosch =

Jaime Bosch may refer to:

- Jaime Felipe José Bosch (1825–1895), known as Jacques Bosch, Catalan guitarist and song composer
- Jaime Milans del Bosch y Ussía (1915–1997), Lieutenant General in the Spanish Army
