= James O'Hara (announcer) =

James O'Hara is a former Scottish television continuity announcer.

O'Hara, a graduate of Manchester University and Aberdeen University, worked at Grampian Television as a staff announcer and newsreader.

He switched to BBC Scotland during the mid-1970s and became one of their first full-time television announcers. In common with other BBC Scotland announcers, O'Hara also directed transmission and read Scottish News summaries both in and out of vision.

He left the corporation in 1988 and became a freelance for BBC North East and BBC West Yorkshire FM (now known as BBC Radio Leeds). In 1994, O'Hara became an audio describer for Audetel, a trial providing audio description of television programmes for blind and partially sighted viewers. The trial was a success and led to the legislation of audio description for digital terrestrial television within the 1996 Broadcasting Act.

O'Hara was the managing editor of the Deluxe's audio description department, working as an audio describer on television programmes and films until his retirement in 2016.
