= Jamie Lee (cricketer) =

New Zealand cricketer (born 1971)

Jamie Baden Lee (born 3 December 1971 in Gisborne, New Zealand) is a former New Zealand cricketer, who played two first-class and five one-day matches for the Northern Districts Knights in the 2003–04.

Lee was a right-handed batsman and a right-arm medium bowler.
