= Jamie A. Koufman =

American physician

Jamie A. Koufman is a physician and researcher on the topic of acid reflux. She coined the terms "laryngopharyngeal reflux" and "silent reflux".

Koufman is the founder and director of the now defunct Voice Institute of New York, a comprehensive voice and reflux treatment center, and Professor of Clinical Otolaryngology at New York Medical College. As a surgeon, Koufman pioneered laryngeal framework surgery in the United States and was a founding member of the International Association of Phonosurgery. She performs voice (vocal cord) reconstruction surgery and office-based minimally invasive laryngeal laser surgery.

Koufman is a past president of the American Bronchoesophagological Association. She has received the Honor Award and the Distinguished Service Awards of the American Academy of Otolaryngology, as well as the Casselberry Award and a Presidential Citation from the American Laryngological Association. For 25 years, Dr. Koufman has lectured and published in the fields of laryngology and acid reflux research.

Koufman is the principal author of Dropping Acid: The Reflux Diet Cookbook & Cure, which provides information on healthy eating for people with acid reflux.
