= Jamie Stang =

American dietitian and nutritionist

Jamie Sue Stang is an American dietitian and nutritionist. She is an associate professor in the Division of Epidemiology and Community Health at the University of Minnesota School of Public Health.

== Early life and education ==
Jamie Sue Stang was born to parents Larry and Ruth. Stang completed a bachelor of science in dietetics at University of North Dakota in 1986. She earned a master of public health in public health nutrition from University of North Carolina at Chapel Hill in 1988. Stang completed a doctor of philosophy in nutrition with a minor in epidemiology and concentration in public health at the University of Minnesota in 1996. She completed postdoctoral research from 1996 to 1997 in maternal and child health nutrition epidemiology in the division of epidemiology at the University of Minnesota School of Public Health. Her thesis was "The effects of iron and folate on serum zinc status in a cohort of pregnant women." Her doctoral advisors were Mary Story and Judith Brown.

== Career ==
From 1997 to 1998, Stang was an instructor in the Department of Food Science and Nutrition at University of Wisconsin–Stout where she taught courses in Maternal and Child Nutrition and Geriatric Nutrition and Medical Terminology. From 1998 to 2005, Stang served as a continuing education specialist and project director for the leadership, education, and training program in maternal and child nutrition at the University of Minnesota School of Public Health. Starting in 2010, she has been associate professor in the division of epidemiology and community health in the School of Public Health at University of Minnesota.

Stang is a registered dietitian through the Commission on Dietetic Registration of the American Dietetic Association. Stang is a licensed nutritionist through the Minnesota Board of Dietetics Licensure.

== Personal life ==
At the time of her dissertation, Stang was married to David Kusner.

== Publications ==
Her most cited peer-reviewed journal articles are:

- Harnack, Lisa, Jamie Stang, and Mary Story. "Soft drink consumption among US children and adolescents: nutritional consequences." Journal of the American Dietetic Association 99.4 (1999): 436–441. According to Google Scholar, it has been cited 1083 times.
- Heim, Stephanie, Jamie Stang, and Marjorie Ireland. "A garden pilot project enhances fruit and vegetable consumption among children." Journal of the American Dietetic Association 109.7 (2009): 1220–1226.. According to Google Scholar, it has been cited 309 times.
- Harnack, Lisa J., Sarah A. Rydell, and Jamie Stang. "Prevalence of use of herbal products by adults in the Minneapolis/St Paul, Minn, metropolitan area." Mayo Clinic Proceedings. Vol. 76. No. 7. Elsevier, 2001.According to Google Scholar, it has been cited 170 times.
- Stang J, Story MT, Harnack L, Neumark-Sztainer D., Jamie, et al. "Relationships between vitamin and mineral supplement use, dietary intake, and dietary adequacy among adolescents." Journal of the American Dietetic Association 100.8 (2000): 905–910.. " .According to Google Scholar, it has been cited 163 times.
- Reicks M, Trofholz AC, Stang JS, Laska MN. "Impact of cooking and home food preparation interventions among adults: outcomes and implications for future programs." Journal of nutrition education and behavior 46.4 (2014): 259–276. " .According to Google Scholar, it has been cited 156 times.
