= Jammie Jamieson =

American fighter pilot

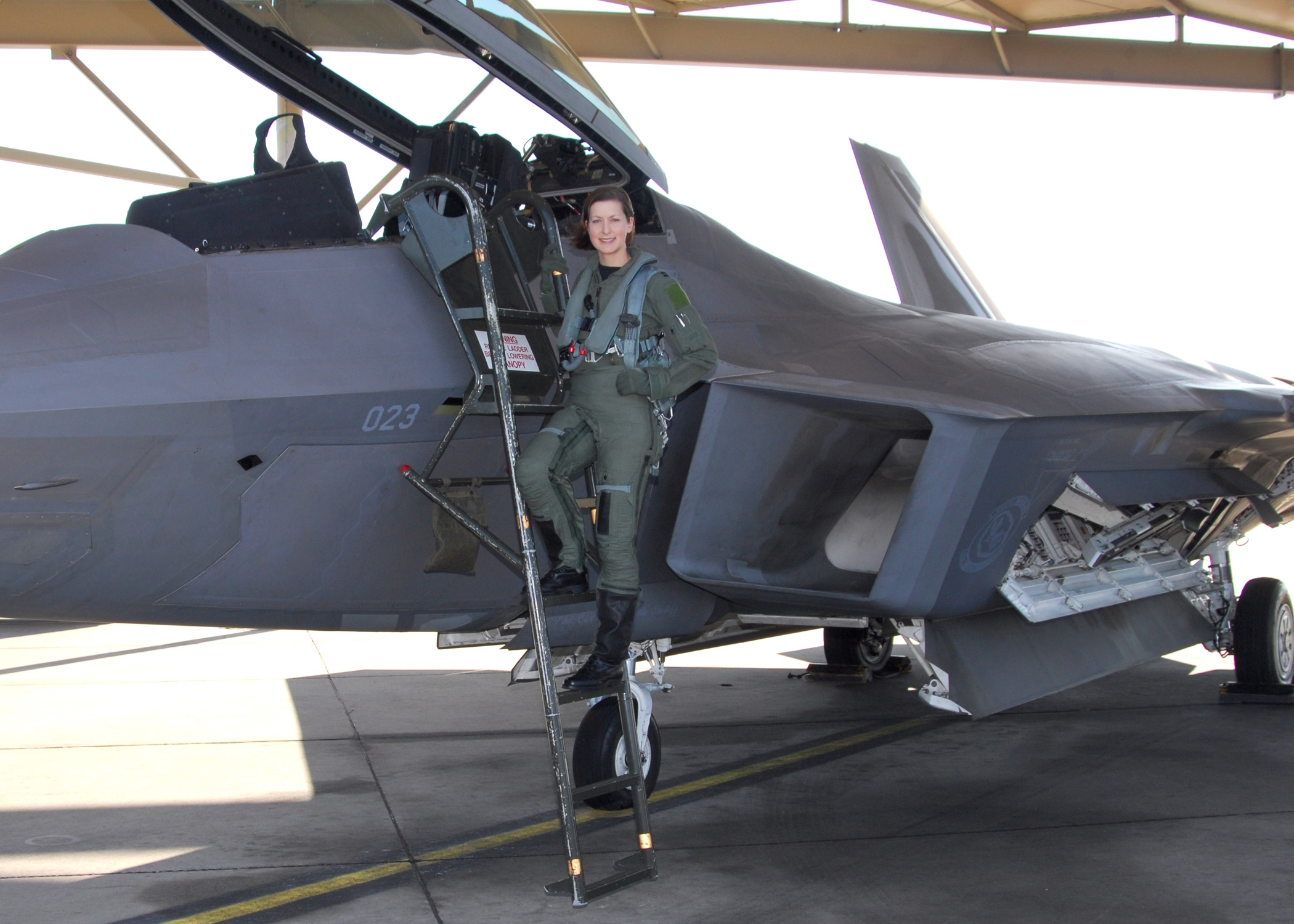
- Jamieson with a F-22A Raptor
- Born: 1982 (age 43–44); Tacoma, Washington, U.S.
- Military career
- Allegiance: United States of America
- Branch: United States Air Force
- Service years: 2000 – present
- Rank: Colonel
- Conflicts: Operation Enduring Freedom

Jammie Jamieson is a United States Air Force officer and the first operational female fighter pilot selected to fly the Lockheed Martin F-22 Raptor. Her call sign is "Trix".

Jammie Jamieson was born in Tacoma and lived in Prosser from 1982 until she left for the Air Force Academy in 1996. After receiving her commission through the academy in 2000 and a master's degree in public policy in national security and political economy from the John F. Kennedy School of Government at Harvard University in 2002, Jamieson completed the F-15C Basic Course at Tyndall AFB. After three years flying the F-15C in Alaska, she completed the F-22A Transition Qualification Course at Tyndall in 2008. She also served as a glider trainer.

She attended as a guest speaker in the air force TV Report that featured a story on American and Iraqi women celebrating Women's Equality Day together on 11 September 2009. Jamieson is a mother of three.

== Gallery ==
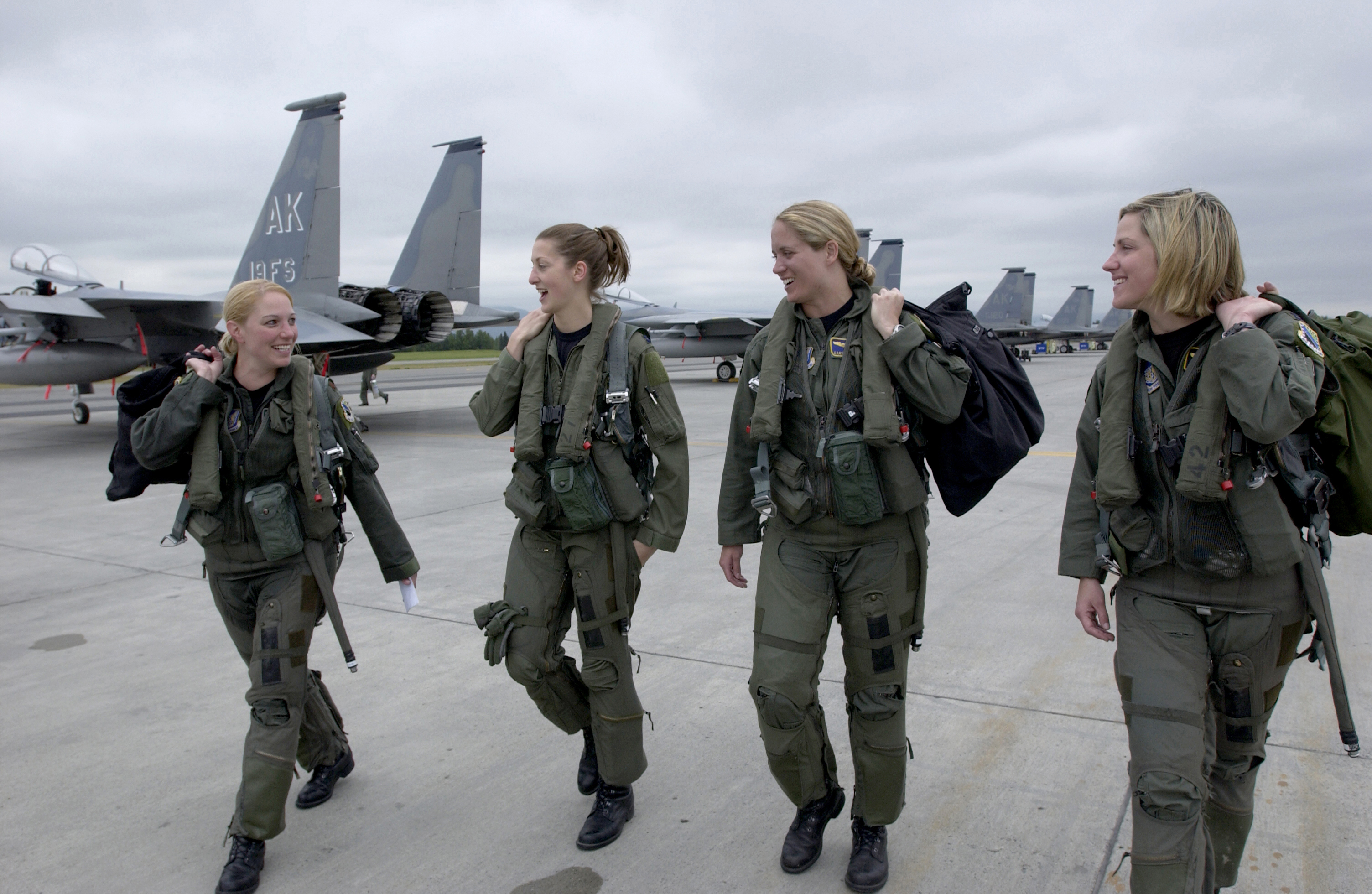
Capt. Jamieson walks with three female fellow F-15 Eagle pilots

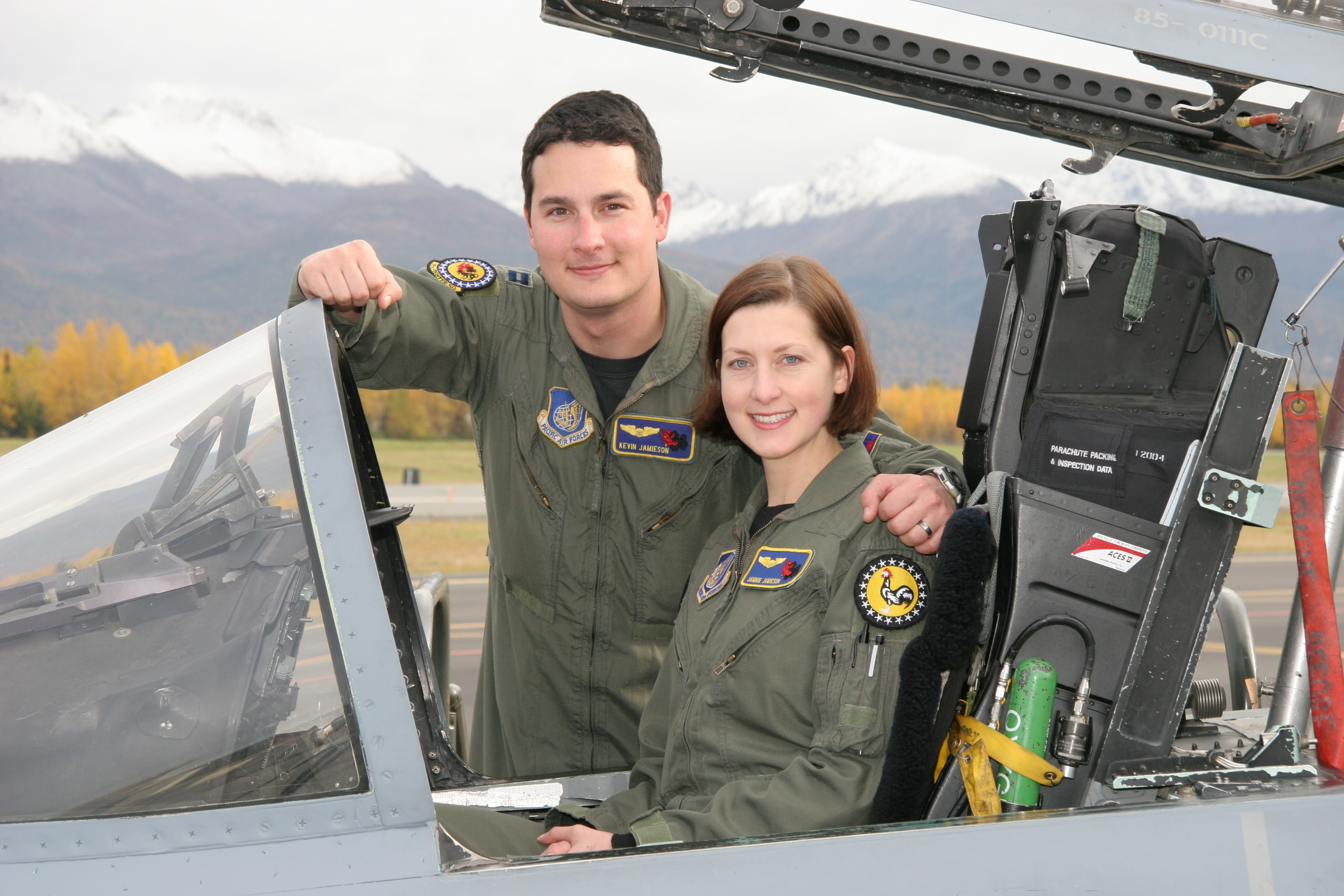
Captains Jammie and Kevin Jamieson pose for a family photo with the F-15C during their assignment to the 3rd Wing at Elmendorf Air Force Base, Ala., in Fall 2007.

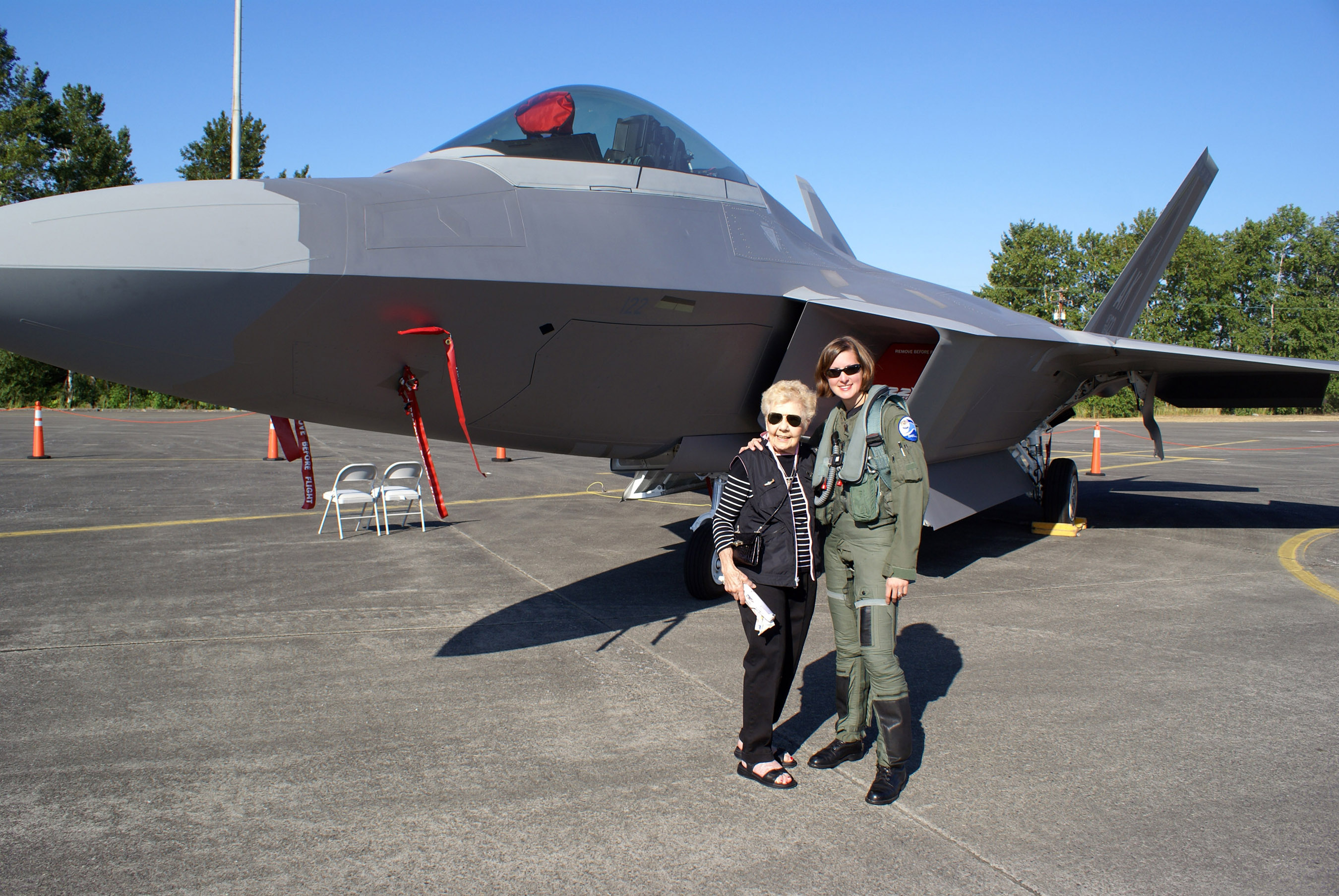
Jamieson with WW2 WASP Dorothy Olsen

Video: First female F-22 Pilot Maj. Jammie Jamieson in Women's Equality Day

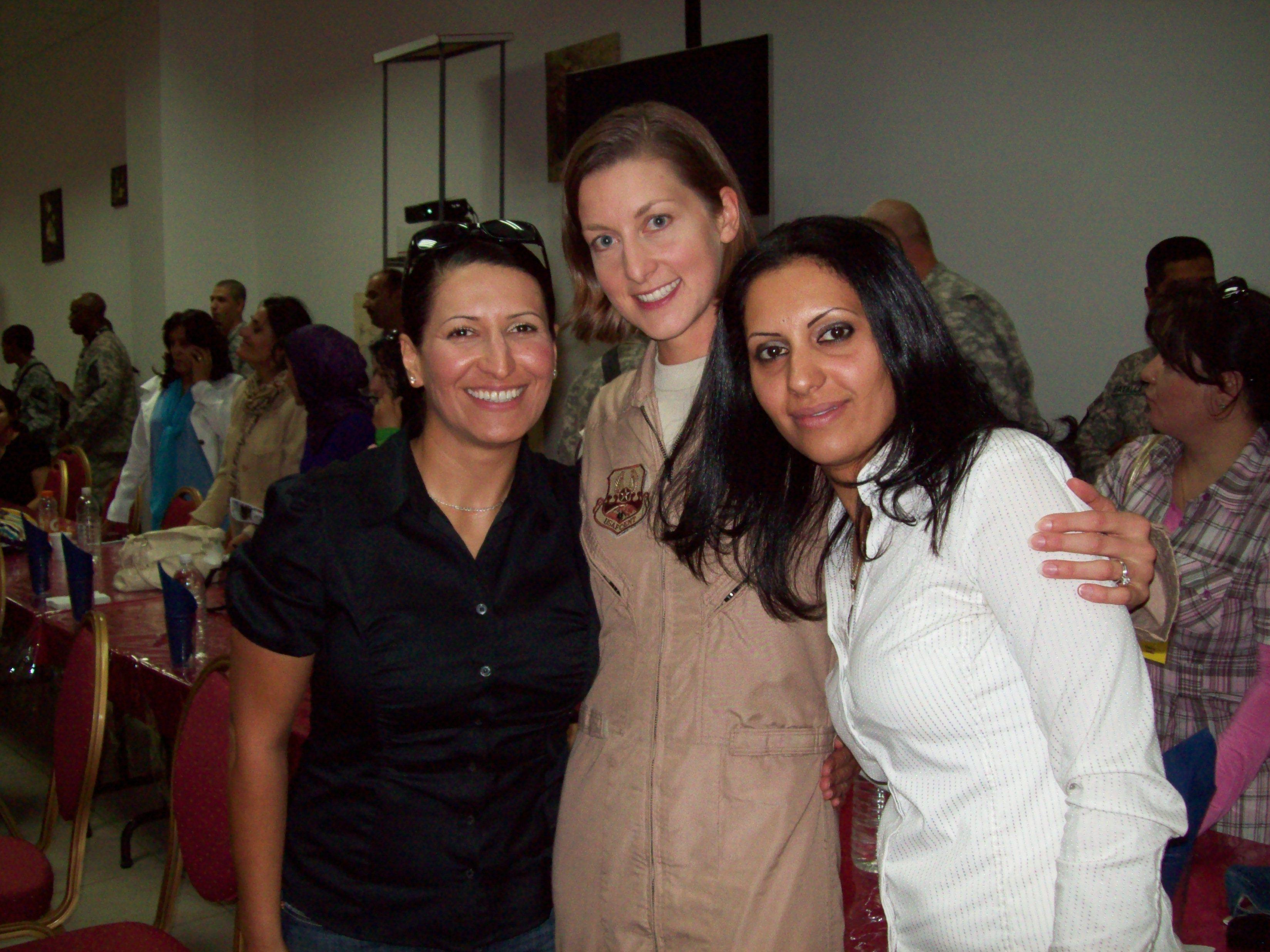
Jamieson with Iraqi translators, celebrating Women's Equality Day

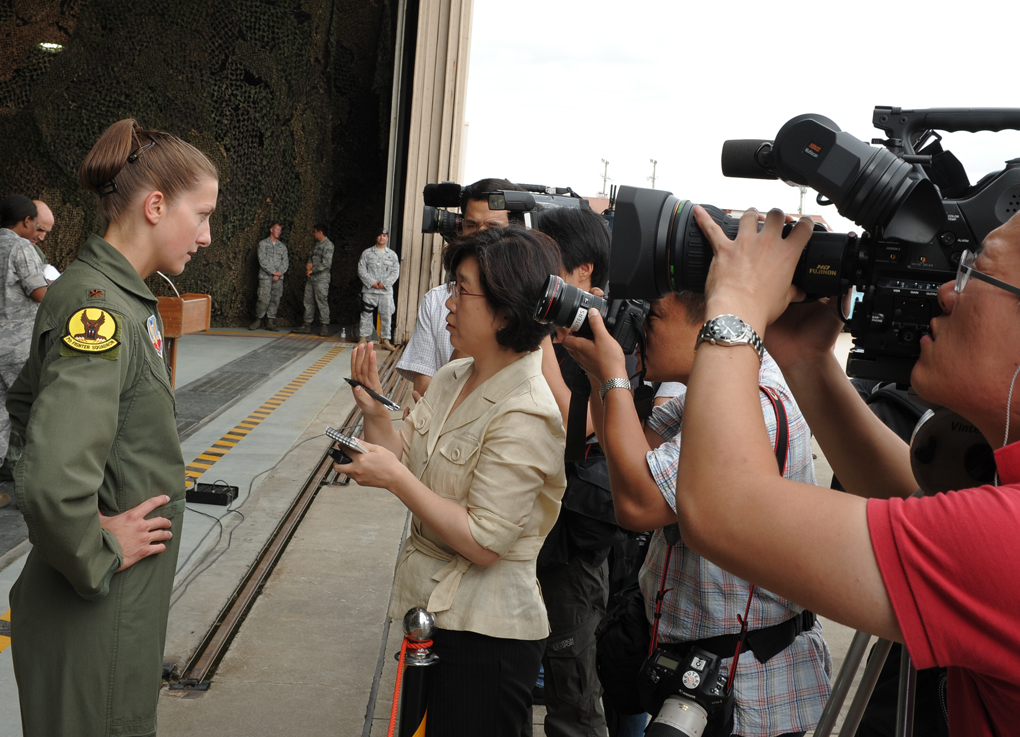
Jamieson interviewed at Osan Air Base

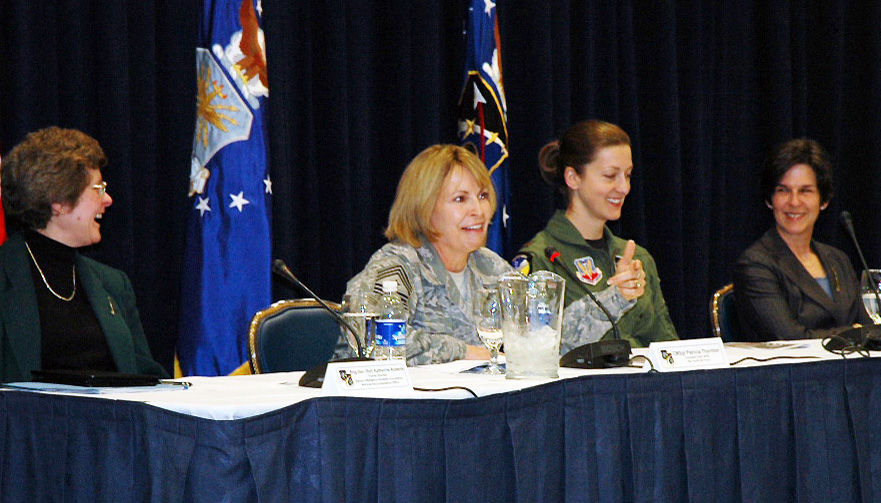
2010 Women's History Month conference
