= Jamie Tarabay =

Australian journalist

Jamie Tarabay is a journalist born in Australia. She is based in New York City.

Tarabay has a B.A. in Government and French from the University of Sydney, is fluent in French and Arabic and has worked as a foreign correspondent. She lived in Beirut for three years as a child and has spent much time as a journalist covering and living in the Middle East. In 2000 she was sent to Jerusalem by the Associated Press and in 2005 she released a book about her experiences in the Middle East during 2000 to 2004: A Crazy Occupation: Eyewitness to the Intifada. She has covered Iraq since the formal end of hostilities in 2003 and from 2005 to 2007 she was the NPR News bureau chief in Baghdad. She was part of the NPR News team that in January 2007 were awarded the Alfred I. duPont-Columbia University Award for their coverage of Iraq. As of early 2014 she was a Senior Staff Writer at Al Jazeera America.

== Bibliography ==
- A Crazy Occupation: Eyewitness to the Intifada
