= Jaimee =

- Jaimee Fourlis, Australian tennis player
- Jaimee Kaire-Gataulu, New Zealand television actress
