= Jay (given name) =

Unisex given name

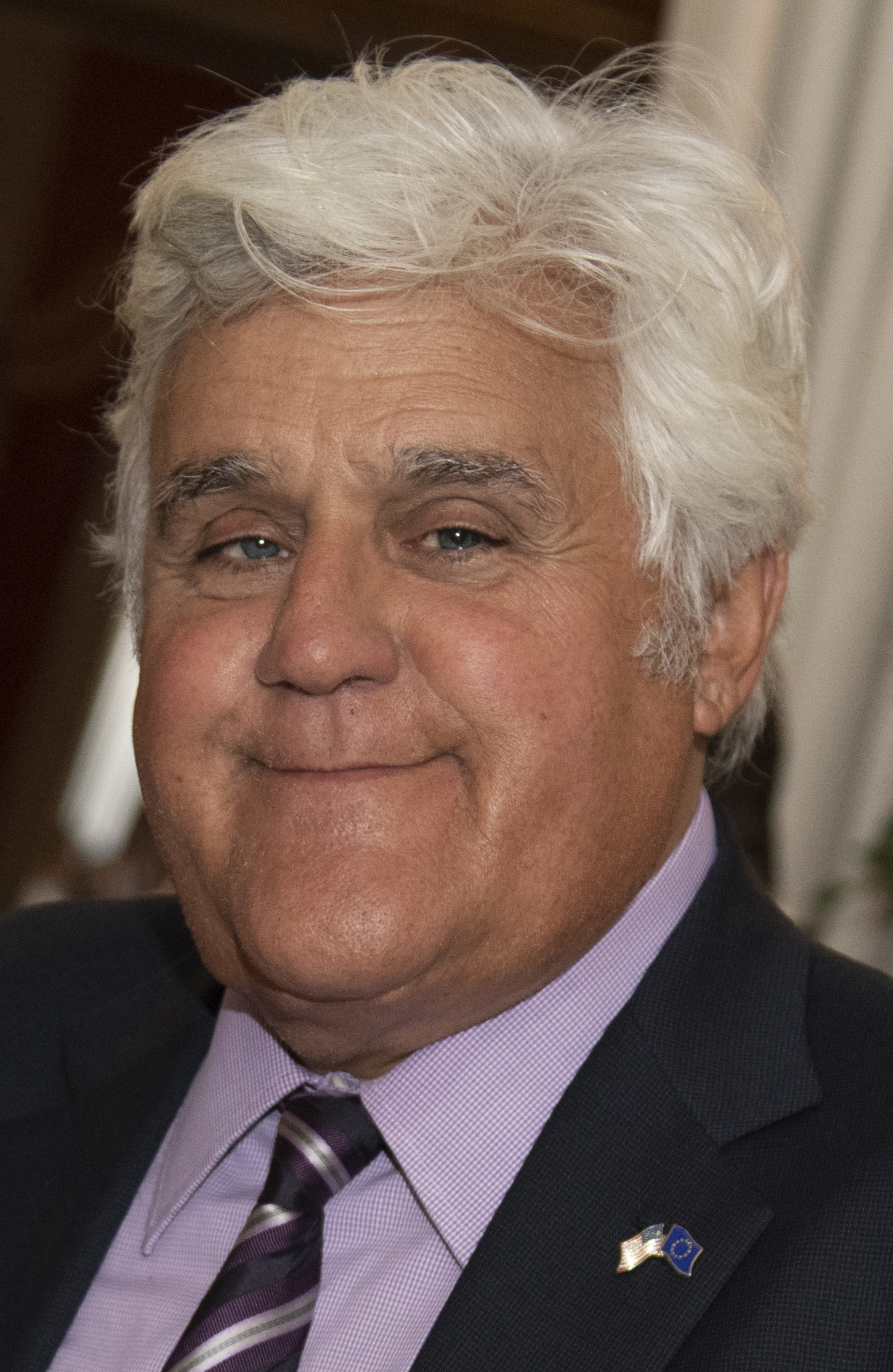
- Jay Leno in 2019
- Pronunciation: /dʒeɪ/
- Gender: Unisex, predominantly masculine

Origin
- Meaning: "intelligent," "joyful," "cheerful," "victory," "triumph"

Other names
- Related names: Ajay, Vijay, Sanjay, Jeet, Ajeet, Jason, Jaylin, Jacob, Jake, James, Jamie, Jadon, Jayden

Jay (or Jai) is a predominantly male given name. 'Jaya' is a female variation or female given name with same meaning and origin from Sanskrit.

It has multiple origins and meanings, commonly associated with intelligence, cheerfulness, and victory. The name is often used as a shortened form of longer names.

Jai and Jay are pronounced differently. Jay is pronounced as in similar to Jaybird and Jai is pronounced as 'J-ae-h'. The spelling 'Jai' is common in South Asia.

In English, Jay is derived from the name of the jaybird, a colorful and intelligent bird known for its lively nature. The name became popular in English-speaking countries during the 19th and 20th centuries, often symbolizing quick thinking, playfulness, and individuality. It may also have roots in Old French from the name Gai, meaning "joyful" or "cheerful".

In Sanskrit, Jay or Jai means "victory" or "triumph" and is commonly used in Indian culture. It is often associated with success, strength, and overcoming challenges. The name has historical significance in Hinduism and Indian traditions, where it appears in religious texts and is used in names such as Jayendra and Jayant.

== Sports ==
- Jay Adams (1961–2014), American skateboarder
- Jay Ajayi (born 1993), English-American NFL football player
- Jay Barnett (born 2001), Australian association football player
- Jay Beagle (born 1985), Canadian ice hockey player
- Jay Berger (born 1966), American tennis player
- Jay Bothroyd (born 1982), English football player
- Jay Bouwmeester (born 1983), Canadian hockey player
- Jay Briscoe (1984–2023), American professional wrestler
- Jay Bruce (born 1987), Major League Baseball player, three-time All-Star
- Jay Cutler (born 1983), American football player
- Jay Cutler (bodybuilder) (born 1971), American bodybuilder
- Jay Dahlgren (born 1948), Canadian javelin thrower
- Jay DeMerit (born 1979), American soccer player
- Jay Devilliers (born 1994), French professional pickleball player
- Jay Emmanuel-Thomas (born 1990), English footballer
- Jay Faatz (1860–1923), American baseball player
- Jay Fiedler (born 1971), American NFL football quarterback
- Jay Haas (born 1953), American golfer
- Jay Higgins (born 2002), American football player
- Jay Horwitz (born 1945), American executive for the New York Mets
- Jay Idzes (born 2000), Dutch-indonesia footballer
- Jay Jones (born 1974), American football player
- Jay Lethal (born 1985), American professional wrestler
- Jay Lynch (footballer) (born 1993), English footballer
- Jay McDonagh (born 1973), American football player
- Jay McKee (born 1977), Canadian ice hockey player
- Jay Monahan (born 1971), PGA Tour commissioner
- Jay Moriarity (1978–2001), American big wave surfer
- Jay Novacek (born 1962), American football player
- Jay-Jay Okocha (born 1973), Nigerian footballer
- Jay O'Shea (born 1988), Irish footballer
- Jay Person (born 2000), American football player
- Jay Scrubb (born 2000), American basketball player
- Jay Sigel (1943–2025), American golfer
- Jay Toia (born 2003), American football player
- Jay Tufele (born 1999), American football player
- Jay Wheeldon (born 1989), English footballer

== Music ==
- Jay Aston (born 1961), English singer
- Jay Azzolina (born 1952), American guitarist
- Jay Bennett (1963–2009), American musician
- Jay Bentley (born 1964), American musician
- Jay Chou (born 1979), Taiwanese musician
- Jay Cloidt (born 1949), American composer and audio engineer
- Jay Dee Daugherty (born 1952), American drummer
- Jay Ferguson (American musician) (born 1947)
- Jay Ferguson (Canadian musician) (born 1968)
- Jay Fung (born 1988), Hong Kong-Canadian singer-songwriter
- Jay Greenberg (composer) (born 1991), American composer
- James "Jay" Huguely (1940–2008), American actor, recording artist known as Cledus Maggard & the Citizen's Band
- Jay Kay (born 1969), British musician and frontman of British band Jamiroquai
- Jay Lane (born 1964), American musician
- Jay Livingston (1915–2001), American composer
- Jay Osmond (born 1955), American musician
- Jay Park (born 1987), Korean American b-boy and singer (Ex-2PM member)
- Jay Park (born 2002), Korean American singer, member of the group ENHYPEN
- Jay Reatard (1980–2010), American musician
- Jay Reynolds, British record engineer
- Jay Sean (born 1979), British musician
- Jay Traynor (1943–2014), American singer, member of the group Jay and the Americans
- Jay Weinberg (born 1990), American drummer
- Jay Wilbur (1898–1970), British bandleader
- Jay Alan Yim (born 1958), American composer
- Jay Yuenger (born 1966), American guitarist
- Jay Zeffin, English musician, composer
- Jay Ziskrout (born 1962), American drummer
- Jeezy (Jay Wayne Jenkins) (born 1977), American rapper

== Television and film ==
- Jay Abdo (born 1962), Syrian actor
- Jay Muldoon (born 2008) Alienland Actor
- Jay Baruchel (born 1982), Canadian actor
- Jay Bhanushali (born 1984), Indian actor
- Jay Brazeau (born 1953), Canadian actor
- Jay Chandrasekhar (born 1968), American director
- Jay Faerber (born 1972), American comic and television writer
- Jay R. Ferguson (born 1974), American actor
- Jay Gallentine (born 1970), American filmmaker and historian
- Jay Harrington (born 1971), American actor
- Jay Hayden (born 1987), American actor
- Jay Hernandez (born 1978), American actor
- Jay Howell (illustrator) (born 1979), American illustrator, animator, cartoonist, and artist
- Jay Ilagan (1953–1992), Filipino actor
- Jay Karnes (born 1963), American actor
- Jay Laga'aia (born 1963), New Zealand actor
- Jay Leno (born 1950), American comedian and talk-show host
- Jay Lycurgo (born 1998), English actor
- Jay McCarroll (born 1974), American fashion designer
- Jay Mohr (born 1970), American actor
- Jay North (1951–2025), American actor
- Jay Odjick, Algonquin artist, writer, and television producer
- Jay Presson Allen (1922–2006), American screenwriter, playwright, and novelist
- Jay Purvis (born 1976), Canadian carpenter and television presenter
- Jay Roach (born 1957), American director
- Jay Ryan (actor) (born 1981), New Zealand actor
- Jay Silverheels (1912–1980), Canadian actor
- Jay Thomas (1948–2017), American actor and talk-show host
- Jay Underwood (born 1968), American actor and pastor
- Jay Wolpert, American television producer and screenwriter

== Politics ==
- Jay C. Block (born 1970), American politician
- Jay DeBoyer, American politician
- Jay Hammond (1922–2005), American politician and state governor
- Jay Inslee (born 1951), American politician
- Jay Jalisi (born 1965), American politician
- Jay Nixon (born 1956), American politician
- Jay Obernolte (born 1970), American politician, businessman, and video game developer
- Jay Rockefeller (1937–2026), American politician
- Jay P. Rolison Jr. (1929–2007), New York politician
- Jay H. Upton (1879–1938), American politician and attorney
- Jay Weatherill (born 1964), Australian politician
- Jay Wolfe (born 1955), American businessman and politician

== Other professions ==
- Jay Adair (born 1969/1970), American businessman, CEO of Copart
- Jay Armes (born 1932), American amputee, actor, and private investigator
- Jay Bhattacharya (born 1968), American-Indian professor
- Jay Boersma (born 1947), American fine art and documentary photographer
- Jay Bybee (born 1953), American judge
- Jay Chaudhry (born 1958/1959), American billionaire, CEO and founder of Zscaler
- Jay Chevalier (1936–2019), American singer and songwriter
- Jay Chiat (1931–2002), American advertising designer
- Jay Cooke (1821–1905), American financier
- Jay Fox (1870–1961), American journalist, trade unionist, and political activist
- Jay Garner (born 1938), American retired US Army lieutenant general and business executive
- Jay Gillenwater (born 1933), American professor
- Jay Gould (1836–1892), American financier
- Jay Greenberg (psychoanalyst) (born 1942), American psychoanalyst and psychologist
- Jay Gunter (1911–1994), American pathologist and amateur astronomer
- Jay Jasanoff (born 1942), American linguist
- Jay Kordich (1923–2017), American author and juice fasting advocate
- Jay McCallum (born 1960), justice of the Louisiana Supreme Court
- Jay McInerney (born 1955), American writer
- Jay Miner (1932–1994), American computer pioneer
- Jay Nordlinger (born 1963), American journalist
- Jay Ohrberg, American car collector and customizer
- Jay Penske, American media entrepreneur
- Jay Pritzker (1922–1999), American businessman
- Jay Raymond (born 1962), American general
- Jay Rosen (born 1956), American writer
- Jay Sekulow (born 1956), American lawyer
- Jay Severin (1951–2020), American radio talk show host
- Jay Ulfelder, American political scientist
- Jay Walljasper (1955/56–2020), American writer, editor, speaker, and community consultant
- Jay Wynne (1968–2025), American weather forecaster
- Jay Xu (born 1963) Chinese-born American museum director, art historian, curator
- Jay Zeamer Jr. (1918–2007), American aeronautical engineer, pilot, and WWII veteran

== Fictional characters ==
- Jay Cartwright, in the television series The Inbetweeners
- Jay Garrick, in the DC Comics universe
- Jay Gatsby, in the 1925 novel The Great Gatsby by F. Scott Fitzgerald
- Jay Guthrie (Icarus), a mutant character in Marvel Comics
- Jay Halstead, in the television series Chicago P.D.
- Jay Hogart, in the television series Degrassi: The Next Generation
- Jay Kelso, a character in That 90's Show
- Jay Kyle, in the TV series My Wife and Kids
- Jay Landsman, in the television series The Wire
- Jay Nakamura, Superman (Jon Kent)'s boyfriend in DC Comics
- Jay Sherman, in the animated series The Critic (TV series)
- Jay Walker (Ninjago), a character in Ninjago
- Jay, in the films of Kevin Smith
- Jay, in the web series Marble Hornets

== Lists of people with the name ==
- Jay Baker (disambiguation), multiple people
- Jay Bell (disambiguation), multiple people
- Jay Bergman (disambiguation), multiple people
- Jay Bernard (disambiguation), multiple people
- Jay Chapman (disambiguation), multiple people
- Jay Clark (disambiguation), multiple people
- Jay Clarke (disambiguation), multiple people
- Jay Clayton (disambiguation), multiple people
- Jay David (disambiguation), multiple people
- Jay Edwards (disambiguation), multiple people
- Jay Ferguson (disambiguation), multiple people
- Jay Foreman (disambiguation), multiple people
- Jay Frank (disambiguation), multiple people
- Jay Gordon (disambiguation), multiple people
- Jay Gould (disambiguation), multiple people
- Jay Greenberg (disambiguation), multiple people
- Jay Harris (disambiguation), multiple people
- Jay Hart (disambiguation), multiple people
- Jay Henderson (disambiguation), multiple people
- Jay Hickman (disambiguation), multiple people
- Jay Hill (disambiguation), multiple people
- Jay Hoffman (disambiguation), multiple people
- Jay Hughes (disambiguation), multiple people
- Jay Hunt (disambiguation), multiple people
- Jay Jackson (disambiguation), multiple people
- Jay Jacobs (disambiguation), multiple people
- Jay Johnson (disambiguation), multiple people
- Jay Johnston (disambiguation), multiple people
- Jay Jones (disambiguation), multiple people
- Jay Katz (disambiguation), multiple people
- Jay Kim (disambiguation), multiple people
- Jay Lawrence (disambiguation), multiple people
- Jay Leach (disambiguation), multiple people
- Jay Lee (disambiguation), multiple people
- Jay Lewis (disambiguation), multiple people
- Jay Lynch (disambiguation), multiple people
- Jay Marshall (disambiguation), multiple people
- Jay Martin (disambiguation), multiple people
- Jay Miller (disambiguation), multiple people
- Jay Mitchell (disambiguation), multiple people
- Jay O'Brien (disambiguation), multiple people
- Jay Powell (disambiguation), multiple people
- Jay Rabinowitz (disambiguation), multiple people
- Jay Robbins (disambiguation), multiple people
- Jay Robinson (disambiguation), multiple people
- Jay Rosenblatt (disambiguation), multiple people
- Jay Ryan (disambiguation), multiple people
- Jay Scott (disambiguation), multiple people
- Jay Smith (disambiguation), multiple people
- Jay Taylor (disambiguation), multiple people
- Jay Turner (disambiguation), multiple people
- Jay Walker (disambiguation), multiple people
- Jay Wallace (disambiguation), multiple people
- Jay Ward (disambiguation), multiple people
- Jay White (disambiguation), multiple people
- Jay Williams (disambiguation), multiple people
- Jay Wright (disambiguation), multiple people

== See also ==
- Jay Jay (disambiguation)
- Jay (disambiguation)
- J (disambiguation)
- Jay (surname)
