= Jay Mountain =

Jay Mountain may refer to:

- Jay Mountain (New York), USA; a mountain located in Essex County
- Jay Mountain Wilderness Area, New York, USA; an Adirondack Park unit of the Forest Preserve located in Essex County

== See also ==
- Mountain Jay (Cyanocitta stelleri), a bird
- Jay Peak (disambiguation)
- Jay Hill (disambiguation)
- Jay Hillock
- Mountain (disambiguation)
- Jay (disambiguation)
- J (disambiguation)
