= Blue Jay (disambiguation) =

The blue jay is a species of bird that is native to North America.

Blue Jay or Blue Jays may also refer to:

== Animals ==
- Graphium evemon, a species of butterfly found in South-east Asia
- A general term for American jays, most of which have largely blue plumage

== People and characters ==
- The nickname of child prodigy composer Jay Greenberg
- Mascot for Raytown Senior High School
- Mascot for Guthrie High School
- The Blue Jay, a name for the character Mortimer Folchart in the novel Inkheart
- Blue Jay (character), DC Comics superhero
- BlueJay, an animator and comedic-documentary style YouTuber based in the United States

== Places ==
- Blue Jay, California, U.S.
- Blue Jay, Ohio, U.S.
- Blue Jay, Pennsylvania, U.S.; a place in Pennsylvania
- Blue Jay, West Virginia, U.S.
- Blue Jays Way, Toronto, Ontario, Canada; the street in Toronto that Rogers Centre, the stadium that is home to the Toronto Blue Jays and the Toronto Argonauts, is addressed to

== Sports ==
- Toronto Blue Jays, a Major League Baseball team based in Toronto, Ontario, Canada, and 4 of its minor league affiliates:
  - Dunedin Blue Jays, of the Advanced-A Florida State League, based in Dunedin, Florida
  - Gulf Coast Blue Jays, of the Rookie-level Gulf Coast League, also based in Dunedin
  - Bluefield Blue Jays, of the Rookie-level Appalachian League, based in Bluefield, Virginia
  - Dominican Summer League Blue Jays, of the Rookie-level Dominican Summer League, based in Boca Chica, Dominican Republic
- A short-lived name for the Philadelphia Phillies in the 1940s
- Johns Hopkins Blue Jays, the mascot and teams of Johns Hopkins University
- Creighton Bluejays, nickname for students, faculty, and alumni of Creighton University and its sports teams
- Minnesota West Bluejays, nickname for student, faculty and alumni of Minnesota West Community and Technical College and its sports teams
- Nippon Blue Jays, a Brazilian baseball club whose name is derived from the MLB Blue Jays

== Media, entertainment, arts ==
- The Blue Jays, a short-lived (1961–62) Los Angeles based doo wop quartet
- Bluejay Books, an independent publishing house run by James Frenkel
- Blue Jay (film), a 2016 film starring Mark Duplass and Sarah Paulson
- Blue Jays (album), a 1975 album by Justin Hayward and John Lodge
- "Bluejay", a song by Bif Naked from The Promise, 2009

== Other uses ==
- Blue Jay missile, a code name used during development of the de Havilland Firestreak missile
- Blue Jay (dinghy), a class of sailboat used primarily in the north-eastern United States
- BlueJ, a Java development environment
- Operation Blue Jay, the code name for the construction of Thule Air Base in Greenland
- Pixel 6a, an Android mid-range smartphone released in 2022, also known as bluejay

== See also ==
- "Blue Jay Way", a 1967 song by The Beatles
- Blue (disambiguation)
- J (disambiguation)
- Jay (disambiguation)
- jay bird (disambiguation)
