= J-Bird =

J-Bird may refer to:

- Japan Airlines Domestic (callsign J-BIRD); see List of defunct airlines of Japan
- J-Bird (videogame), a Q*bert knockoff game, see also List of self-booting IBM PC compatible games
- J-Birds, a robotics team that competed at the Charged Up (FIRST)
- "Jaybird" is a slang term with several meanings, most commonly referring to a person who talks a lot, or a novice/simpleton. It is also famous for its use in the idiom "naked as a jaybird," meaning completely nude.

== Fictional characters ==
- Joan 'J-Bird', a fictional character from the 2019 U.S. crime drama film Duke (film)
- Jeremiah "J-Bird" Peet, a fictional character from the 2001 U.S. horror film Bones (2001 film)
- Jules "J-Bird" Cobb, a fictional character from the U.S. TV sitcom Cougar Town

== See also ==
- One on One: Dr. J vs. Larry Bird (game), a 1983 basketball videogame from EA Sports
- J-Bird Digital Designs, https://jbirddigitaldesigns.com/
- Jailbird (disambiguation)
- Jay bird (disambiguation)
- Bird (disambiguation)
- J (disambiguation)
