= Jay Powell =

Jay Powell may refer to:

- Jay Powell (baseball player) (born 1972; James Willard "Jay" Powel), American baseball player
- Jay Powell (politician) (1952-2019; Alfred Jackson "Jay" Powell Jr.), member of the legislature of the U.S. State of Georgia
- Jerome Powell (born 1953; Jerome Hayden "Jay" Powell), 16th chair of the U.S. Federal Reserve

== See also ==
- Jay (given name)
- Powell (surname)
- J (disambiguation)
- Jay (disambiguation)
- Powell (disambiguation)
