= Jay Leach =

Jay Leach may refer to:

- Jay Leach (ice hockey, born 1951), assistant coach for several NHL hockey teams, uncle of the below
- Jay Leach (ice hockey, born 1979), AHL and NHL hockey player and coach, nephew of the above
