= Isabelle Aboulker =

French composer (born 1938)

- Born: 23 October 1938 (age 88); Boulogne-Billancourt, France
- Genres: Classical; opera; vocal music
- Occupations: Composer; educator
- Years active: 1960s–present
- Awards: Académie des Beaux-Arts Prize (1999); SACD Music Prize (2000)

Isabelle Aboulker (born 23 October 1938) is a French composer, particularly known for her operas and other vocal works. In 1999, she gained a prize from the Académie des Beaux-Arts and in 2000 the music prize of the Société des Auteurs et Compositeurs Dramatiques for her numerous lyric pieces.

== Life and work ==
Isabelle Aboulker was born in the Parisian suburb of Boulogne-Billancourt. Her father was the Algerian-born film director and writer Marcel Aboulker and her maternal grandfather was the composer Henry Février. While following a course in composition and keyboard studies at the Conservatoire National Supérieur de Musique in Paris, she started composing for the theatre, the cinema and television. She then worked for the Conservatoire as their chief accompanist and voice teacher and authored several educational works. In 1980, she turned to composing operas and subsequently many other vocal works.

Because of her work with children, Isabelle Aboulker made a particular speciality of composing pieces, which would appeal to them or in which they could participate, as they do in Les Fables enchantées (2004), based on the work of Jean de la Fontaine. Other subjects have included Beauty and the Beast, Cinderella and Tom Thumb (Petit Poucet). Among her work for adults are two operas based on plays by Eugène Ionesco and settings of poems by Guillevic and Charles Cros. In 1998, she was commissioned by the Orchestre de Picardie to write the oratorio L'Homme qui titubait dans la guerre to commemorate the 80th anniversary of the ending of World War I and this was subsequently chosen to represent France when Weimar became European city of culture in 1999. To celebrate the second centenary of Honoré de Balzac's birth that same year she was commissioned by the Grand Théâtre in Tours to write the comic opera Monsieur de Balzac fait son théâtre.

The 2011 contemporary classical album Troika, by Julia Kogan, includes Isabelle Aboulker's song cycle Caprice étrange, set to poems written in French by 19th-century Russian poets Mikhail Lermontov, Aleksandr Pushkin and Fyodor Tyutchev.

== Note ==
- The article is based on French-language resources at the website on the composer and the Classical Composers database
