= Jay Peak =

Jay Peak can refer to

- Jay Peak Resort, an alpine skiing area located in Jay, Vermont, USA.
- Jay Peak (Vermont), a 1,176-m-high mountain in Jay, Vermont, USA

== See also ==
- Jay Mountain (disambiguation)
- Jay Hill (disambiguation)
- Jay Hillock
- J (disambiguation)
- Jay (disambiguation)
- Peak (disambiguation)
