= Jay Bird =

Jay Bird or Jaybird or variation, may refer to:

- Jay, several species of birds in the crow family, Corvidae
  - Blue jay (Cyanocitta cristata)

== Places ==
- Jaybird, Ohio, USA; an unincorporated community in Adams County
- Jay Bird Springs, Georgia, USA; an unincorporated community in Dodge County
- Jaybird Island, Lake Kapowsin, Pierce County, Washington, USA; an island
- Jaybird Creek, a tributary of the Siletz River in Oregon, USA
- Jaybird Pond, Oxford County, Maine, USA; see List of lakes of Maine
- Jay Bird Mine, Carberry Creek, Oregon, USA; see List of mines in Oregon
- Jay Bird Mine, Granite, Oregon, USA; see List of mines in Oregon

== People ==
- Jay Bird (footballer) (born 2001), English footballer
- Jaybird Coleman (1896–1950) U.S. country blues musician
- Jerry "Jaybird" Drennan, a U.S. musician, and former associate of The Picks

=== Fictional characters ===
- Jason "Jaybird" Watkins, a character from the U.S. comedy TV show The Last O.G.
- Jaybird, a character from Adventure Time (season 3)

== Groups, companies, organizations ==
- The Jaybirds, a UK blues rock band
- Jaybird (company), a Utah-based consumer electronics company
- The Jay Bird Democrats, a political faction involved in the Jaybird–Woodpecker War
- Cleveland Jaybirds, a softball team

== Arts and entertainment ==
- The Jay Bird, a 1920 short Western film
- The Jaybird, a 1932 novel by MacKinlay Kantor
- "Jaybird", a 2006 song by Comets on Fire off the album Avatar
- "Jaybird", a 2008 tune from the film The Lazarus Project, off the soundtrack album
- "Jaybird", a 2011 song by The Coathangers off the album Larceny & Old Lace

== Other uses ==
- VJ-21 Jaybird, an aircraft; see List of civil aircraft
- Software: Jaybird, a JDBC driver for Firebird (database server)

== See also ==
- Ziryab (789–857; Persian: زَریاب, lit. 'Jaybird'), Islamic golden age polymath and artist
- J-Bird (disambiguation)
- Jay (disambiguation)
- Bird (disambiguation)
- Blue jay (disambiguation)
- Sojka (disambiguation) (Slavic languages: jaybird)
