= Sojka =

Sojka, sójka or šojka is a word for the Eurasian jay in several Slavic languages.

It may also refer to:

== People ==
- Agnieszka Skalniak-Sójka (born 1997), Polish cyclist
- Arkadiusz Sojka (1980–2012), Polish footballer
- David Sojka (born 1994), Czech cyclist
- Gary Allan Sojka (born 1940), American academic
- Ján Sojka (born 1990), Slovak footballer
- Katarzyna Sójka (born 1986), Polish politician
- Stanisław Sojka (1959–2025), Polish musician
- Trude Sojka (1909–2007), Czech-Ecuadorian artist

== Places ==
- Sojka Pavilion, a sport arena in Lewisburg, Pennsylvania

== Other ==
- Sojka III, an unmanned aerial vehicle operated by the Czech Army

== See also ==
- Jay bird (disambiguation)
- Jay (disambiguation)
- Soyka (disambiguation)
