= List of Mississippi State Bulldogs head softball coaches =

The Mississippi State Bulldogs softball program is a college softball team that represents Mississippi State University in the Southeastern Conference. The Bulldogs compete in the National Collegiate Athletic Association (NCAA) Division I. The current head coach is Samantha Ricketts, who coached her first season in 2020.

The first season of softball at Mississippi State was in 1982, and no team was sponsored from 1987–1996. The team has had six recorded head coaches.

The Huskies have appeared in the Women's College World Series once, in 2026, when they finished tied for seventh with an 0–2 record.

Jay Miller holds the record for most victories overall and within the SEC, at 295 and 98, respectively. Current coach Samantha Ricketts has the highest winning percentage at .633. Kathy Arendsen's .520 winning percentage in SEC games is the best among Bulldog coaches.

== Key ==
General
#	Number of coaches (Note: A running total of the number of head coaches.)
GC	Games coached

Overall
OW	Wins
OL	Losses
OT	Ties
O%	Winning percentage

Conference (Note: The Bulldogs played as Independents from 1982 through 1986. With the relaunching of the program in 1997, they played in the Southeastern Conference.)
CW	Wins
CL	Losses
CT	Ties
C%	Winning percentage

Postseason (Note: Postseason play involving the NCAA Division I softball championship.)
PA	Total appearances (Note: Postseason appearances include seasons with NCAA Division I softball championship bids since the tournament began in 1982.)
PW	Total wins
PL	Total losses
WA	Women's College World Series appearances (Note: Women's College World Series appearances include seasons with WCWS bids since the tournament began in 1969.)
WW	Women's College World Series wins
WL	Women's College World Series losses

Championships
DC	Division regular season (Note: The Southeastern Conference used a divisional format from 1997–2014. Regular season conference championships were not recognized in those seasons.)
CC	Conference regular season
CT	Conference tournament (Note: The SEC softball tournament began in 1997.)

== Coaches ==
List of head Softball coaches showing season(s) coached, overall records, conference records, postseason records, championships and selected awards (Note: Statistics correct as of the end of the 2026 college softball season.)
#	Name	Term	GC	OW	OL	OT	O%	CW	CL	CT	C%	PA	PW	PL	WA	WW	WL	DCs	CCs	CTs	NCs	Awards
1	Lynn Keiser	1982–1983	39	8	31	0	.205	—	—	—	—	—	—	—	—	—	—	—	—	—	0	—
2	Vivian Langley	1984–1986	109	66	43	0	.606	—	—	—	—	—	—	—	—	—	—	—	—	—	0	—
3	Kathy Arendsen	1997–2002	380	219	161	0	.576	90	83	0	.520	2	3	4	—	—	—	—	—	—	0	—
4	Jay Miller	2003–2011	548	295	253	0	.538	90	83	0	.520	6	6	12	—	—	—	—	—	—	0	—
5	Vann Stuedeman	2012–2019	465	276	189	0	.594	69	127	0	.352	7	7	14	—	—	—	—	—	—	0	—
6	Samantha Ricketts	2020–present	381	241	140	0	.633	59	83	0	.415	5	14	10	1	0	2	—	—	—	0	—
