= Jay Jacobs =

Jay Jacobs may refer to:

- Jay Jacobs (retailer), American clothing retailer
- Jay Jacobs (businessman) (1911/12-2013), American founder of the retailer
- Jay Jacobs (athletic director), director of athletics for the Auburn Tigers athletic department
- Jay Jacobs (broadcaster) (born 1938), color analyst and retired public school administrator
- Jay Jacobs (politician) (born 1953), American politician and member of the Maryland House of Delegates
- Jay S. Jacobs, American attorney, political strategist and New York State Democratic Party official
- Jay Jacobs (executive), president of PIMCO
