= J band =

J band may refer to:

- J band (infrared), an atmospheric transmission window centred on 1.25 μm
- J band (JRC), radio frequency bands from 139.5 to 140.5 and 148 to 149 MHz
- J band (NATO), a radio frequency band from 10 to 20 GHz
