= Troika (Julia Kogan album) =

Studio album by Julia Kogan
- Released: 8 December 2011
- Genre: Contemporary classical
- Length: 64:46
- Label: Rideau Rouge Records / Harmonia Mundi distribution
- Producer: Chloë Nicolas

Troika: Russia's westerly poetry in three orchestral song cycles is a 2011 album of contemporary classical songs performed by soprano Julia Kogan, who also conceived the project. She is accompanied by The St. Petersburg Chamber Philharmonic conducted by Jeffery Meyer. The songs are set to Russian, English, and French language poetry by five classic Russian writers: Joseph Brodsky, Mikhail Lermontov, Vladimir Nabokov, Aleksandr Pushkin and Fyodor Tyutchev. Eight modern composers, from France, Russia, and the United States, wrote music for the album: Isabelle Aboulker, Ivan Barbotin, Eskender Bekmambetov, Jay Greenberg, James DeMars, Andrey Rubtsov, Michael Schelle and Lev Zhurbin.

The three song cycles on the album are “there…”, set to Russian poems and their English auto-translations by Joseph Brodsky; “Sing, Poetry”, set to Russian poems and their English auto-translations by Vladimir Nabokov; and “Caprice étrange”, set to French poems by Mikhail Lermontov, Aleksandr Pushkin and Fyodor Tyutchev. The common point of the three song cycles is that they are based upon poetry that reflects its authors’ active linguistic integration into Western culture.

== Album structure ==
=== “there…” (2006) ===
“there…” is a setting of five poems originally written by Joseph Brodsky in Russian and subsequently translated into English by the author: “Пятая годовщина” / “The Fifth anniversary” (extract), “Английские каменные деревни” / “Stone Villages”, “То не Муза воды набирает в рот” / “Folk Tune” (extract), “Колыбельная” / “Lullaby” (extract) and “Новый Жюль Верн” / “The New Jules Verne” (Part IX). The English and Russian versions of each poem are set to music by Eskender Bekmambetov. In the case of the first four poems, the Russian and English texts are interspersed to form a single song. In the case of “Новый Жюль Верн” / “The New Jules Verne”, the Russian and English versions are sequential: the character of Blanche Delarue first reads letters addressed to her in Russian, then (supposedly in a state of inebriation ten years later) in English. “there…” was premiered at the Pavel Slobodkin Concert Hall in Moscow 14 June 2007. A New York Times review of the American premiere at Carnegie Hall's Weill Hall with Chamber Orchestra Kremlin stated “The work, a sort of musical theater piece with lyrical, thick orchestral textures, was at times redolent of Shostakovich, Piazzolla and Weill.” Following a performance at the Library of Congress, The Washington Post described “there…” as “a constantly shifting fabric of earthy Russian melody, folksy Americana and all sorts of wryly spoofed dance forms, from ragtime to tango.”

=== “Sing, Poetry” (2009) ===
The cycle is based on three poems originally written by Vladimir Nabokov in Russian in his youth and self-translated into English towards the end of the author's life. The Russian and English versions of each poem are independently set to music by a Russian and an American composer, respectively: “Дождь пролетел” / “The Rain Has Flown” by Lev Zhurbin and Michael Schelle; “Еще безмолвствую” / “I Still Keep Mute” by Andrey Rubtsov and Jay Greenberg; and “Прованс” / “Provence” by Ivan Barbotin and James DeMars. The title of the cycle evokes that of Nabokov's autobiography (“Speak, Memory”). “Sing, Poetry” was premiered at Glinka Hall in Saint Petersburg on 25 December 2009.

=== “Caprice étrange” (2008) ===
The cycle, by composer Isabelle Aboulker, is based on four poems written in French by three great poets of the “golden age” of Russia's poetry: Aleksandr Pushkin, Mikhail Lermontov, and Fyodor Tyutchev. The poems are: Pushkin's “Mon Portrait” (1814) and “Couplets” (1817) (titled “Jusqu’au plaisir de nous revoir” on the album after the phrase ending each of the couplets), Lermontov's “Quand je te vois sourire…” (1830 or 1831) and Tyutchev's “Nous avons pu tous deux…”. The title of the cycle is taken from the text of Lermontov's poem. “Caprice étrange” was premiered at Glinka Hall in Saint Petersburg on 25 December 2009.

== Critical reception ==
The album was released in France on 8 December 2011 with international release to follow in 2012. It was featured on Radio France and has been praised for its “irresistible charm”, “musicality of the singing”, and “originality and quality of realization” as well as for its “luxurious” presentation and “Julia Kogan’s magical voice”.
