= Jason Johnson =

Jason Johnson may refer to:

== Sportsmen ==
- Jason Johnson (baseball) (born 1973), American baseball player
- Jason Johnson (Jamaican footballer) (born 1990), Jamaican soccer player for Phoenix Rising FC
- Jason Johnson (Australian footballer) (born 1978), retired Australian rules footballer
- Jason Johnson (quarterback) (born 1979), former Canadian Football League player
- Jason Johnson (offensive lineman) (born 1974), American football player
- Jason Johnson (wide receiver) (born 1965), American football player
- Jason Johnson (linebacker) (born 2001), American football player

== Others ==
- Camoflauge (Jason Akeil Johnson), American rapper
- Jason Johnson (actor) (born 1974), American kickboxer and actor
- Jason Johnson (professor), Morgan State University professor and political editor of The Source magazine
- Jason Johnson (radio presenter) (born 1967), Canadian radio presenter who works in the radio industry in Singapore
- Jason Johnson (University of the Cumberlands), a student expelled from the University of the Cumberlands because he is gay
- Jason Johnson (entrepreneur), American technology entrepreneur and investor

== See also ==
- Jason Johnston, musician
- Jay Johnson (disambiguation)
