= Soyka =

Soyka (Cyrillic: сойка) is a word for the Eurasian jay in several Slavic languages.

It may also refer to:

== People ==
- Reinhold Soyka (b. 1952), German athlete
- Stanisław Sojka (1959–2025), also known as Stanisław Soyka, Polish musician
- Ulf-Diether Soyka (b. 1954), Austrian musician

== Places ==
- Soyka Saddle, a location in the South Shetland Islands, Antarctica

== See also ==
- Sojka (disambiguation)
