= Jay Greenberg =

Jay Greenberg may refer to:

- Jay Greenberg (composer) (born 1991), American composer
- Jay Greenberg (psychoanalyst) (born 1942), American psychoanalyst and psychologist
- Jay Greenberg (journalist), American sports journalist
