= Jay White (disambiguation) =

Jay White (born 1992) is a New Zealand professional wrestler.

Jay White may also refer to:

- Jay White (impersonator), Canadian impersonator
- Jay White House, single-family home in Lapeer, Michigan, U.S.

== See also ==
- White (surname)
