= Jay Henderson =

Jay Henderson may refer to:

- Jay Henderson (ice hockey)
- Jay Henderson (footballer)
- Jay Henderson (basketball)
