= Jay Bernard =

Jay Bernard may refer to:

- Jay Bernard (writer) (born 1988), British writer, artist, and film programmer
- Raymond Harold Sawkins (1923–2006), British novelist who published under many pseudonyms including Jay Bernard
