= Jay Baker =

Jay Baker may refer to:

- Jay Baker (actor) (born 1961), American actor and producer
- Jay Baker (rugby union) (born 1991), Welsh rugby union player
- Jay Baker, American sheriff for Cherokee County, Georgia involved in the 2021 Atlanta spa shootings

== See also ==
- Jay Bakker (born 1975), American pastor and author
