= Jay Johnson =

Jay Johnson may refer to:

== Arts and entertainment ==
- J. J. Johnson (1924–2001), American musician, a.k.a., "Jay Jay Johnson"
- Jay Johnson (ventriloquist) (born 1949) American ventriloquist and actor
- Jay Kenneth Johnson, (born 1977) American actor
- Jay Armstrong Johnson (born 1987), American actor, singer, and dancer
- Jay Johnson (singer), American doo-wop singer

== Law and politics ==
- Jay Johnson Morrow (1870–1937) American governor of the Panama Canal Zone
- Jay Johnson (politician) (1943–2009), U.S. congressman from Wisconsin
- Jeh Johnson (alternately spelled "Jay", born 1957), U.S. Secretary of Homeland Security

== Sports ==
- Jay Johnson (American football player) (born 1945), American football linebacker
- Jay Johnson (runner) (born 1959); American mountain runner
- Jay Johnson (American football coach) (born 1969)
- Jay Johnson (baseball coach) (born 1977), American baseball coach
- Jay Johnson (pitcher) (born Canada, 1989), Canadian baseball player

== Others ==
- Jay Johnson (model) (born 1948), American business executive and model
- Jay L. Johnson, American naval officer

== See also ==
- Jay Johnston (disambiguation)
- Jason Johnson (disambiguation)
