= Jay Johnston (disambiguation) =

Jay Johnston may refer to:

- Jay Johnston (born 1968), American actor and comedian
- Jay Johnston (ice hockey) (born 1958), retired Canadian NHL defenceman

== See also ==
- Jay Johnstone (1945–2020), American former professional baseball player
- Jay Johnson (disambiguation)
