= Jay Wallace =

Jay Wallace may refer to:

- Jay Wallace (journalist), president of FOX News
- R. Jay Wallace (born 1957), professor of philosophy at the University of California
- James Wallace (English footballer) (born 1991), English footballer
