= Jay Jacobs (retailer) =

- Company type: Corporation
- Industry: Retail
- Founded: 1941
- Defunct: September 3, 1999
- Fate: Bankrupt
- Headquarters: Seattle, Washington
- Website: None

Jay Jacobs was a clothing retailer based in downtown Seattle, Washington, founded in 1941 by its namesake Jay Jacobs (October 13, 1911 – February 15, 2013). It specialized in trendy clothing for teens, mainly targeting girls. Although the company's first 20 years saw the opening of only two more stores, it was largely profitable at its height in the mid-1980s and operated 288 stores in 22 western states by 1993.

However, 1992 saw a major about face from success and many of the stores, especially in southern California, were becoming unprofitable and were closed. Although the cause of the turnaround is difficult to put a finger on, a recession, which proved troublesome for many retailers, could have been partially to blame. Some thought the company was expanding too quickly and its assets were spread too thin. Others argued that Jacobs had lost touch with the rapidly changing fashion trends and that he never gave his son-in-law enough control over the company.

In an attempt to gain back lost business, the company tried to expand its target audience by going after young adults with career oriented clothing. This did not work, however, and with stores closing and rapidly falling sales, Jay Jacobs filed for Chapter 11 bankruptcy in May 1994.

Less than half the stores remained after the bankruptcy proceedings concluded. Founder Jay Jacobs resigned as chairman of the board in June 1997 and left the board entirely the following November. They again filed for Chapter 11 on September 3, 1999, and announced the closure of the remaining 114 stores the same day.

Jacobs, the namesake of the company, died February 15, 2013.
