= Jay Bird Springs, Georgia =

Unincorporated community in Georgia, United States

Coordinates: 32°07′53″N 83°00′20″W

Jay Bird Springs is an unincorporated community in Dodge County, in the U.S. state of Georgia.

== History ==
The first permanent settlement at Jay Bird Springs was made about 1900.
