= The Blue Jays =

American doo-wop group

The Blue Jays were a short-lived American doo wop ensemble from Venice, California.

The Blue Jays formed in 1961, and after performing at an amateur's night at the Fox Theatre, they were asked by Werly Fairburn to sign to his Milestone Records. Their debut single was "Lover's Island", written by group members Leon Peels and Alex Manigeault, which became a hit in the U.S., reaching No. 31 on the Billboard Hot 100 in 1961. Later singles included "Tears are Falling" (1961) and "The Right to Love" (1962), but the group saw no further success and broke up in 1962.

Leon Peels briefly launched a solo career later in the 1960s.

== Members ==
- Leon Peels (born 1936, Newport, Arkansas, died April 10, 1999, Venice, California)
- Van Richardson
- Alex Manigo/Manigeault
- Leonard Davidson
