= Jailbird =

Jailbird or Jail Bird may refer to:

== Arts and entertainment ==
- The Jailbird, a 1920 US film
- Jailbird (novel), a 1979 book by Kurt Vonnegut
- "Jailbird", a song on the 1994 album Give Out But Don't Give Up by Primal Scream
- Jail Birds, a 1914 American silent short drama film
- Jail Birds (1931 film), an American film
- Jail Birds of Paradise, a 1934 American film
- Jailbirds (1940 film), a British film
- Jailbirds (1991 film), an American television film
- Jailbirds (2015 film), a French-Belgian film
- Jailbirds (TV series), a 2019 Netflix reality television series
- Snake Jailbird, a Simpsons character

== Other uses ==
- Jailbirds of Kerensky, a term for some prisoners released during the Russian Revolution
- A prisoner

== See also ==
- Yardbird (disambiguation)
