= Jay Rosenblatt =

Jay Rosenblatt may refer to:

- Jay S. Rosenblatt, professor of psychology
- Jay Rosenblatt (filmmaker), American experimental documentary filmmaker
