= Jay Taylor =

Jay Taylor may refer to:

== Sports ==
- Jay Taylor (basketball) (1967–1998), American shooting guard
- Jay Taylor (defensive back) (born 1967), American football cornerback
- Jay Taylor (placekicker) (born 1976), American football kicker

== Others ==
- F. Jay Taylor (1923–2011), American historian (List of presidents of Louisiana Tech University)
- Jay Taylor (author) (born 1931), American foreign service agent, academic, documentarian
- Jay Taylor (actor) (born 1983), English writer and director
- Jay Taylor (West Virginia politician)
- Jay Taylor, a character in the 1993 film Hocus Pocus

== See also ==
- James Taylor (disambiguation)
