= Jay Robbins =

Jay Robbins may refer to:

- Jay M. Robbins (born 1945), American racehorse trainer
- Jay T. Robbins (1919–2001), U.S. Air Force General

== See also ==
- J. Robbins (born 1967), American musician
