= Jay Hart =

Jay Hart may refer to:

- Jay Hart (footballer) (born 1990), English forward
- Jay Hart (set decorator) (fl. 1990s–2020s), American set decorator
- Jay Hart, pen name of Joe Gow (born 1960), American academic and pornographic actor
