= Jay Jones (disambiguation) =

Jay Jones (born 1989) is an American politician serving as the attorney general of Virginia since 2026.

Jay Jones may also refer to:

- Jay Jones (American football), wide receiver for the Indiana Firebirds
- Jay Jones, flute and saxophone player of the Blackbyrds
