= Jay Hoffman =

Jay Hoffman may refer to:

- Jay Hoffman (politician) (born 1961), member of the Illinois House of Representatives
- Jay Hoffman (rugby league) (born 1958), Australian rugby league footballer
- Jay Hoffman (soccer) (born 1951), American soccer player and coach
