= Jay Scott (disambiguation) =

Jay Scott (1949–1993) was an American-Canadian film critic.

Jay Scott may also refer to:

- Jay Scott (saxophonist) (1953–2009), American saxophonist
- Jay Scott (singer), Canadian rapper and singer
- Jay D. Scott (1952–2001), American murderer executed in Ohio
- Jay Scott, British singer associated with the band Kingsland Road

== See also ==
- Jay Scott Prize, a Canadian film award
