= Jay Kim (disambiguation) =

Jay Kim (born 1939) is a Korean-American politician.

Jay Kim may also refer to:

- Kim Jung-ju (1968−2022), South Korean businessman
- Jay (South Korean singer) (born 1983), South Korean singer and actor
