= NZR J class =

NZR J class could refer to one of these classes of locomotives operated by New Zealand Railways:

- NZR J class (1874)
- NZR J class (1939)
