= Jay Mountain Wilderness Area =

Forest preserve in Essex County, New York

- IUCN category Ib (wilderness area)
- Location within the United States
- Location: Adirondack Park New York USA
- Nearest city: Jay, NY
- Coordinates: 44.29818°N 73.66805°W
- Area: 7,951 acres (3,218 ha)
- Established: 1985
- Governing body: New York State Department of Environmental Conservation

The Jay Mountain Wilderness Area, an Adirondack Park unit of the Forest Preserve, lies within the towns of Jay and Lewis in Essex County, New York. It is bounded by Glen Road on the south and private land boundaries elsewhere, except where the road west of Mt. Fay divides an appendage of state lands.

The wilderness area is named for its second-highest peak, Jay Mountain. The highest peak within the area is actually Saddleback Mountain, not be confused with the mountain of the same name within the High Peaks Wilderness Area of Adirondack State Park (which is the 17th highest peak of the Adirondack Mountains).

== Geography ==
The high and precipitous mountains in this area are generally similar in character to the Hurricane Mountain Primitive Area.

== Recreation ==
The area is suitable for backcountry hiking and backpacking. Jay is the only peak within this wilderness with a marked, maintained trail, where as all other hikes within are bushwhacks. The vistas from Jay, Saddlebrook and Slip Mountains make the climb to the vantage points well worthwhile. The AuSable Valley can be seen as well as the Champlain Valley and the High Peaks.

== See also ==
- List of Wilderness Areas in the Adirondack Park
