= Jay Gould (disambiguation) =

Jay Gould (1836–1892) was an American financier and leading railroad developer and speculator.

Jay Gould may also refer to:

- Jay Gould II (1888–1935), his grandson, American real tennis player
- Jay M. Gould (1915–2005), statistician and epidemiologist
- Stephen Jay Gould (1941–2002), American biologist and author
- Jay Gould (entrepreneur) (born 1979), American tech entrepreneur
