= Jay Jackson =

Jay Jackson may refer to:

- Jay Jackson (announcer) (1918–2005), television and radio announcer
- Jay Jackson (artist) (1905–1954), cartoonist and comic strip illustrator for the Chicago Defender
- Jay Jackson (baseball) (b. 1987), professional baseball player
- Jay Jaxon (1941–2006), African-American fashion designer
