= Jay Jacobs (executive) =

Jay Jacobs is president of PIMCO.

== Education ==
He has an MBA from Georgetown University McDonough School of Business. He received his undergraduate degree from the College of Arts and Sciences at Washington University in St. Louis.
