= Jay White House =

- U.S. National Register of Historic Places
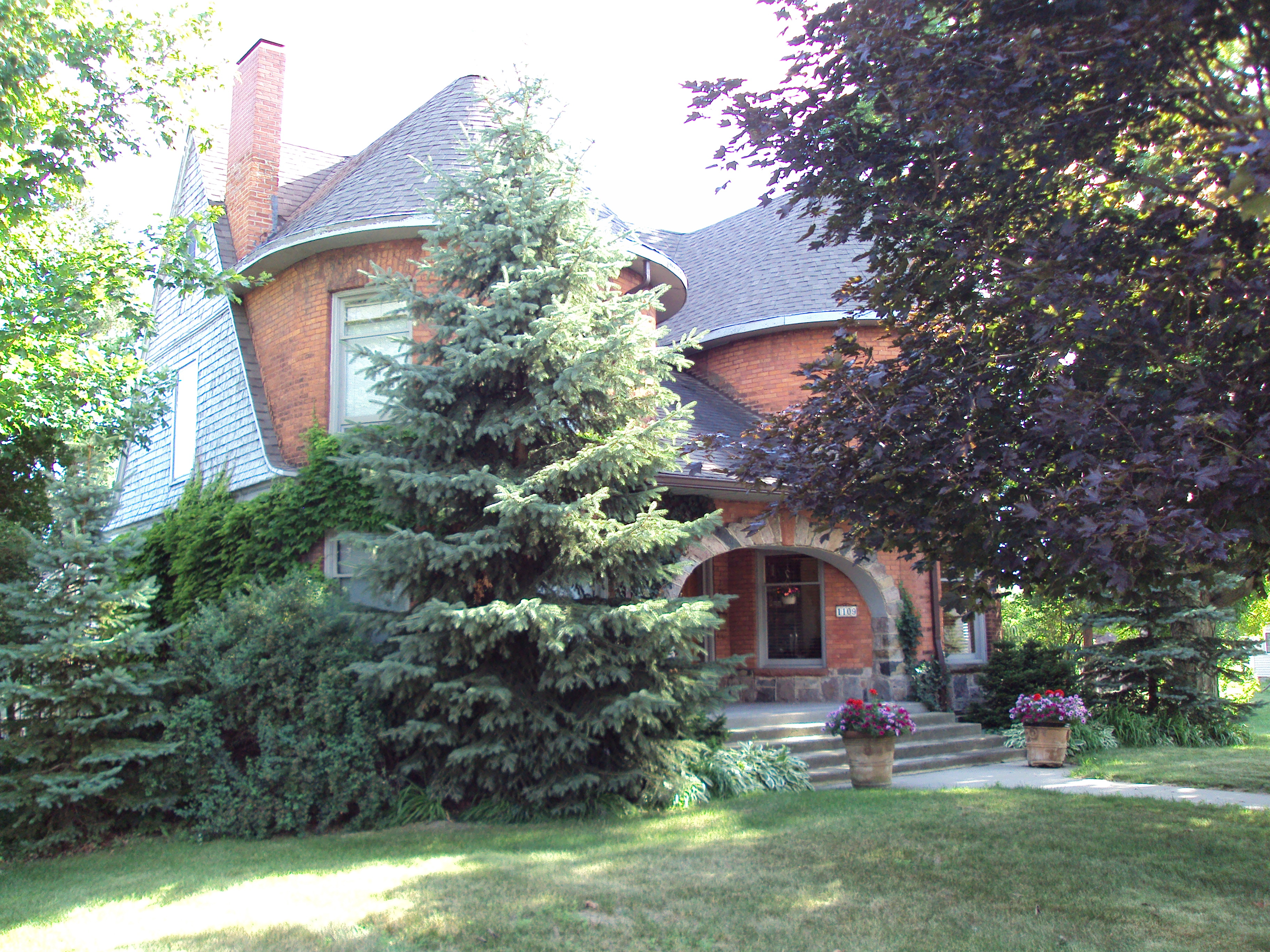
- Interactive map
- Location: 1109 W. Genesee St., Lapeer, Michigan
- Coordinates: 43°03′02″N 83°19′14″W
- Area: less than one acre
- Built: 1899
- Architectural style: Romanesque Revival
- MPS: Lapeer MRA
- NRHP reference No.: 85001636
- Added to NRHP: July 26, 1985

The Jay White House is a single-family home located at 1109 W. Genesee Street in Lapeer, Michigan. It was listed on the National Register of Historic Places in 1985.

== History ==
Phineas and Enoch White were two of Lapeer's original pioneering settlers. Jay White, one of their descendants, was born in 1869. This house was apparently constructed for him and his wife, Emma Gale, in 1899 or 1900, when the couple was in Hanover, Germany, serving as US Consul. It was then sold to George H. Cary, the owner of the Marshall Hotel and Livery. A later owner was Raymond T. Carpenter, a clothing merchant.

== Description ==
The Jay White House is a two-story brick and shingle residence. It is a unique and individualized architectural style, with primarily Romanesque Revival influences. The roof of the house is steeply pitched in the front, running upward from above the front entrance between two side towers. The recessed front entrance porch is reached through a wide but shallow arch, framed with split fieldstones. The massive, squat towers are topped with conical roofs and copper finials. The first floor level is clad in brick, which changes to shingles on the upper portions of the side facades. The windows in the house are all double-hung with the upper sash one-half the height of the lower.
