= Jay Lawrence =

Jay Lawrence may refer to:

- Jay Lawrence (actor) (1924–1987), American stand-up comedian and actor
- Jay Lawrence (politician), member of the Arizona House of Representatives
