= Jay Hunt =

Jay Hunt may refer to:

- Jay Hunt (television executive) (born 1967), former controller of BBC One
- Jay Hunt (director) (1855–1932), American film director and actor
- Jay Hunt (TV presenter) (born 1966), British stylist and TV presenter
