= Jay Ward (disambiguation) =

Jay Ward (1920–1989) was an American animator.

Jay Ward may also refer to:

- Jay Ward (American football) (born 2000), American football player
- Jay Ward (baseball) (1938–2012), American baseball player and coach
