= Jay Mitchell =

Jay Mitchell may refer to:

- Jay Mitchell, pseudonym used by American author Jennifer Roberson
- Jay Mitchell (judge), American lawyer and judge from Alabama
- Jay Mitchell (EastEnders)
