= Jay Martin =

Jay Martin may refer to:

- Jay Martin (ski jumper) (born 1944), American former ski jumper
- Jay Martin (soccer coach), head college soccer coach
- Jay Martin, TV director and singer, husband of Denise Lor
- Jay Martin, American football player in the 1991 Florida Citrus Bowl
- Jay Martin (lawyer), former state representative
