= Jay O'Brien =

Jay O'Brien may refer to:

- Jay O'Brien (ice hockey)
- Jay O'Brien (bobsleigh)
- Jay O'Brien (Virginia politician)
