= Jay Marshall =

Jay Marshall may refer to:

- Jay Marshall (magician) (1919–2005), magician and ventriloquist
- Jay Marshall (baseball) (born 1983), Major League Baseball pitcher
