= Jay Lee =

Jay Lee may refer to:

- Jay Lee (politician), British National Party member
- Jay L. Lee (1887–1970), American football player and coach
- Jay H. Lee, South Korean chemical engineer
- Lee Jae-yong (businessman) (born 1968), South Korean business magnate, known professionally in the West as Jay Y. Lee
