= Jay Rabinowitz =

Jay Rabinowitz may refer to:

- Jay Rabinowitz (film editor), American film editor
- Jay Rabinowitz (jurist) (1927–2001), American jurist and Chief Justice of the Alaska Supreme Court
