= Jay Frank =

Jay Frank may refer to:

- Jay Frank (racing driver), (1918–1965), American racing driver
- Jay Frank (music executive), (1971–2019), American music executive
