= Julia Kogan =

American opera singer

- Born: March 28, 1971 (age 55); Kharkiv, Ukrainian SSR, Soviet Union (now Ukraine)
- Occupation: Coloratura soprano
- Years active: 2000-present
- Known for: Playing the Queen of the Night in Mozart's The Magic Flute, co-screenwriting Florence Foster Jenkins

Julia Kogan (born 28 March 1971) is a coloratura soprano.

== Early life ==
Kogan was born to a Soviet Jewish family in Kharkiv, Ukraine in 1971. During childhood, her family emigrated to the United States via the Vienna–Rome Pipeline. They ultimately settled in a suburb of Columbus, Ohio, where she was active in high school plays and musicals, including starring in the lead role of Annie. Afterwards, she completed a bachelor of music at the Ohio State University and a master's of music at Butler University in Indiana, before moving to the United Kingdom and France, where she launched her opera career.

== Career ==
Kogan's operatic roles have included Queen of the Night in Die Zauberflöte, Zerbinetta in Ariadne auf Naxos, Blonde in Die Entführung, Madame Herz in Der Schauspieldirektor, Greta Fiorentino in Street Scene, and Fiordiligi Cosi fan tutte at the opera houses of Avignon, Indianapolis, Limoges, Manitoba, Toulon, Toulouse and in Oxford. She has been described as "a lively actress" with "a warm voice, round, elegant and expressive phrasing, and a remarkable knack for coloratura passages", "up to the challenge of a stratospheric soprano line".

Kogan has concertized with repertoire ranging from Baroque to contemporary in Europe, North and South America, and Africa, including such venues as Carnegie Hall, Alice Tully Hall at the Lincoln Center, St. Petersburg's Glinka Hall, the Hôtel de Ville in Paris, the Alcazar Palace in Seville, the Library of Congress in Washington D.C., and collaborated with Chamber Orchestra Kremlin, Ensemble Calliopée, Figueiredo Consort, Junge Philharmonie Wien, Les Passions, The Little Orchestra Society, the Oxford Philharmonic, the Newcastle Baroque Orchestra, Saint Petersburg Chamber Philharmonic, Toulon Opera Orchestra, and Ukrainian National Symphony, among others.

Julia Kogan wrote and presented the BBC Radio 4 documentary "The Lost Songs of Hollywood", which aired on 12 November 2015. It was chosen "Pick of the Week" on BBC radio.

She is also credited with originating and co-screenwriting the 2016 film Florence Foster Jenkins starring Meryl Streep and Hugh Grant based on the true story of an early 20th century socialite and amateur soprano known for her poor singing ability.

== Releases ==
Kogan's first solo album, Vivaldi Fioritura (2010), was recorded with Chamber Orchestra Kremlin under Misha Rachlevsky. Her second solo album, Troika (2011), was recorded with the St. Petersburg Chamber Philharmonic under Jeffery Meyer. Both albums were released on Rideau Rouge Records with distribution by Harmonia Mundi.
