= Jay Chapman =

Jay Chapman may refer to:

- Jay Chapman (physician), American physician and forensic pathologist
- Jay Chapman (soccer) (born 1994), Canadian soccer player
- Jaye Chapman (born 1987), American baseball player
