= Jay Leach (ice hockey, born 1951) =

American ice hockey coach

- Born: May 24, 1951 (age 75) Lexington, Massachusetts, U.S.
- Died: September 30, 2026 (aged 75)
- Height: 6 ft 2 in (188 cm)
- Weight: 200 lb (91 kg; 14 st 4 lb)
- Position: Center
- Shot: Right
- Played for: Syracuse Hornets; Manchester Blackhawks; Erie Golden Blades; Nashville South Stars
- Playing career: 1980–1983

Jay Leach (born May 24, 1951 – September 30, 2026) was an American former ice hockey assistant coach of the National Hockey League's Los Angeles Kings, Atlanta Thrashers, New Jersey Devils, and Washington Capitals.

== Career ==
Leach served as assistant coach for Team USA under Bob Johnson in the 1991 Canada Cup. He also served as assistant coach for the U.S. Men's National Team in the 2004 and 2006 World Championships. He also has five years of head coaching experience in the American Hockey League with the Springfield Indians and the Hershey Bears.

On June 25, 2013, Leach was named associate head coach for the University of Maine men's ice hockey team.

== Personal life ==
Leach's nephew, Jay Leach, was the head coach of the Providence Bruins, an assistant coach with the Seattle Kraken., and is now the head coach of the Hartford Wolf Pack. Leach passed away after battling Dementia for years on September 30, 2026 at the age of 75.
