= Jay Lynch (disambiguation) =

Jay Lynch may refer to:

- Jay Lynch (died 1919) Lynching victim in Lamar, Missouri on May 28, 1919
- Jay Lynch (footballer) (born 1993)
- Jay Patrick Lynch (1945–2017) was an American cartoonist
