= Jay Mountain (New York) =

Peak of the Adirondack Mountains

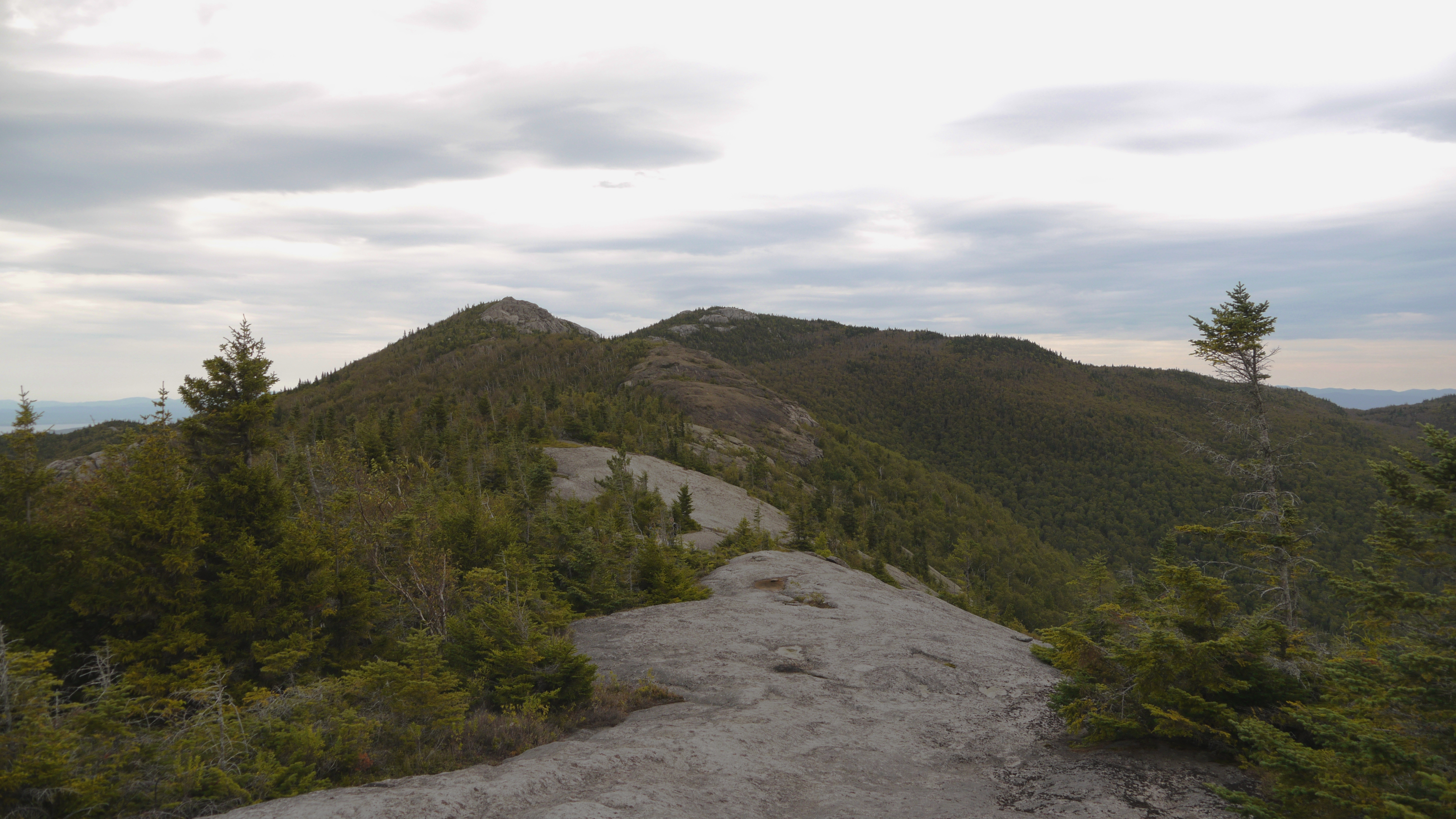

Highest point
- Elevation: 3,600 ft (1,100 m)
- Prominence: 2,149 ft (655 m)
- Coordinates: 44°19′11″N 73°41′28″W

Geography
- Location: Jay, New York, U.S.
- Parent range: Adirondacks
- Topo map: USGS Au Sable Fork

Climbing
- Easiest route: Hike

Jay Mountain is the 79th highest peak of the Adirondack Mountains, with an elevation of 3,600 ft. (1,100 m.). It is located in Essex County, New York, in the Jay Mountain Wilderness Area, within the towns of Jay and Lewis.

Jay Mountain is typically accessed via a trail extending from Jay Mountain Road, proceeding 3.5 miles (5.6 km.) to the summit. The trail ascends the Jay Mountain Ridge, following rock cairns, for roughly 1.5 miles (2.4 km.) before reaching the true summit. The summit offers views to the High Peaks, and the nearby Soda Range

== Gallery ==
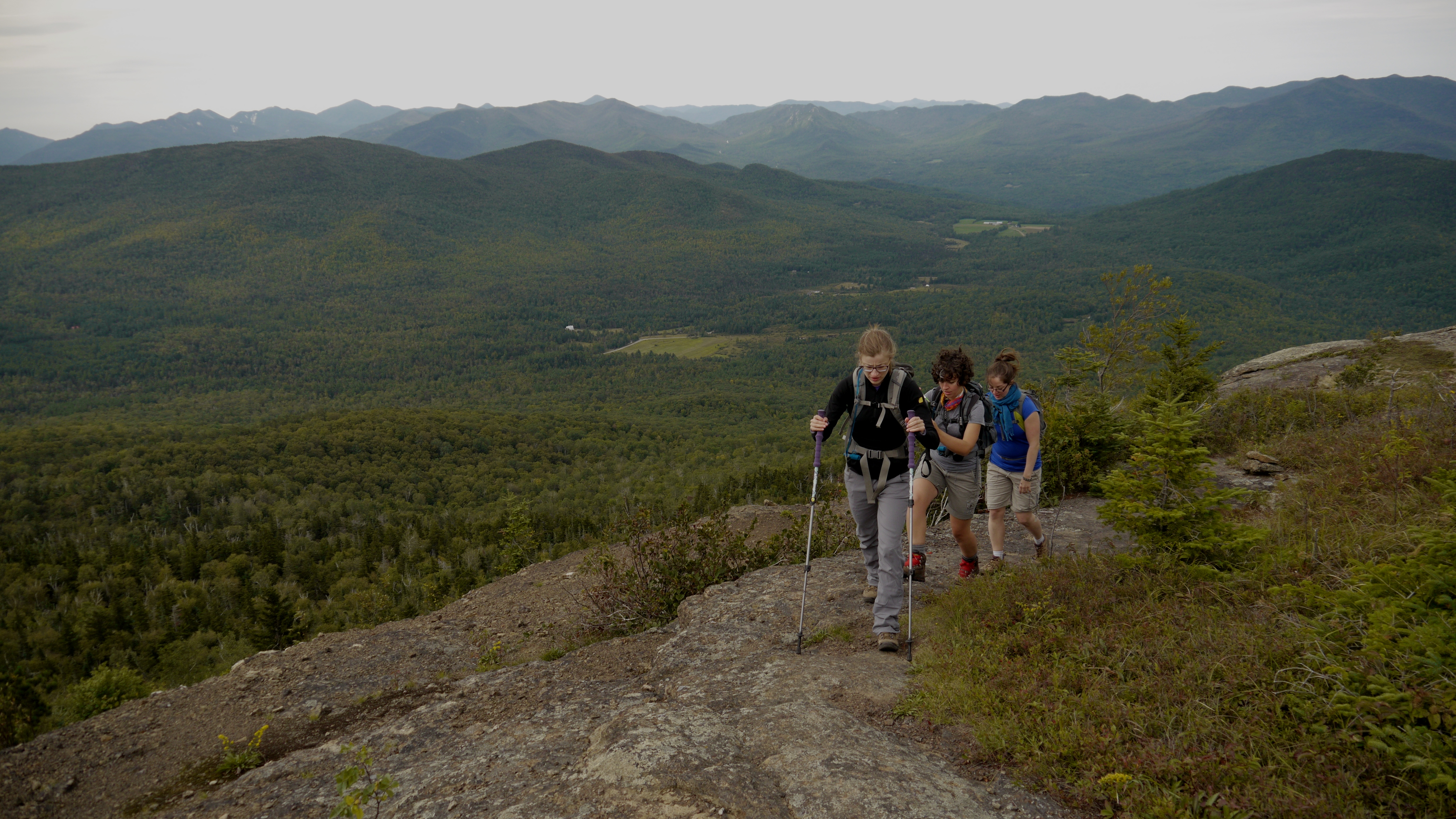
Ascending Jay on the ridge looking south

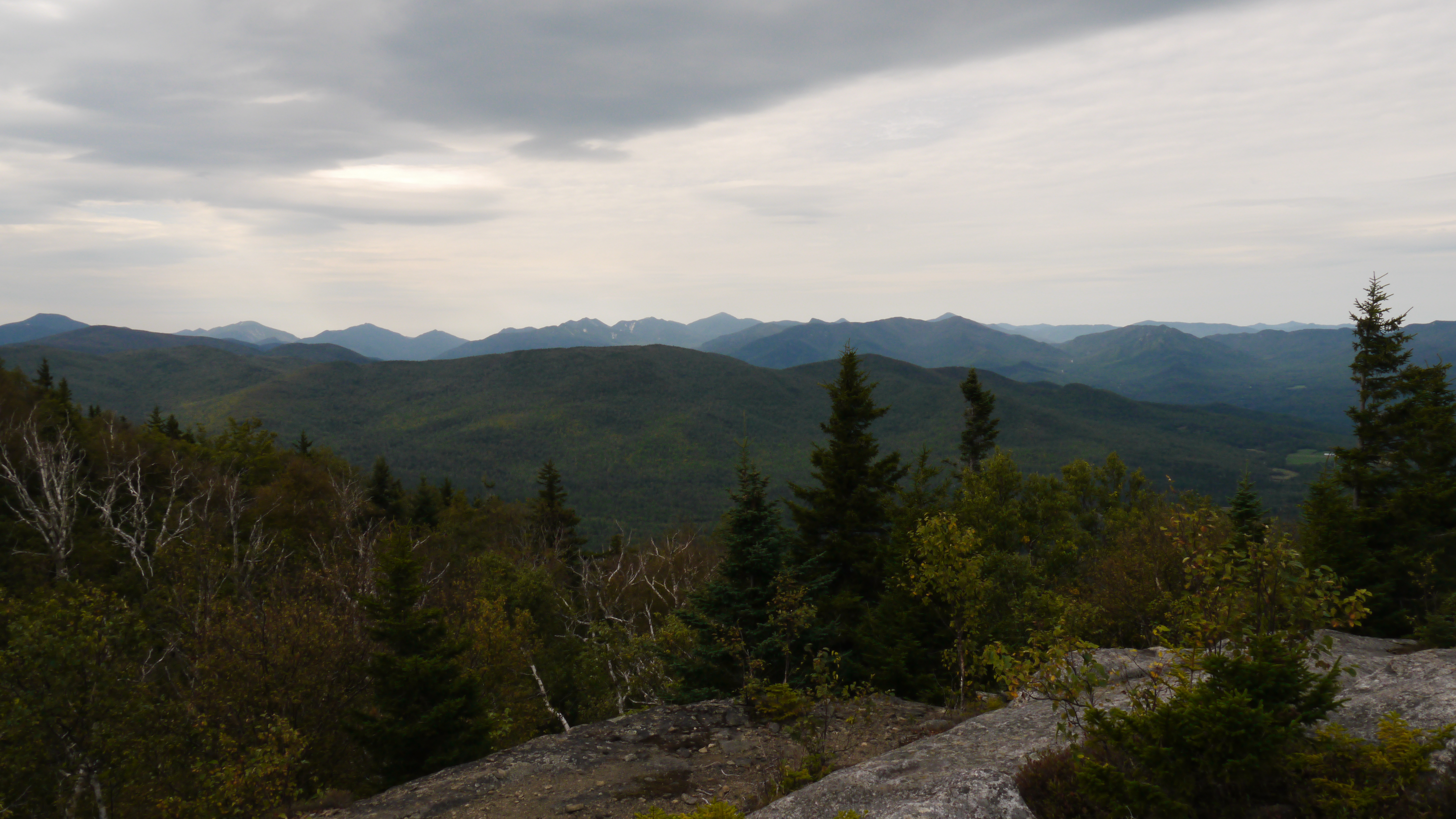
View from west belvedere

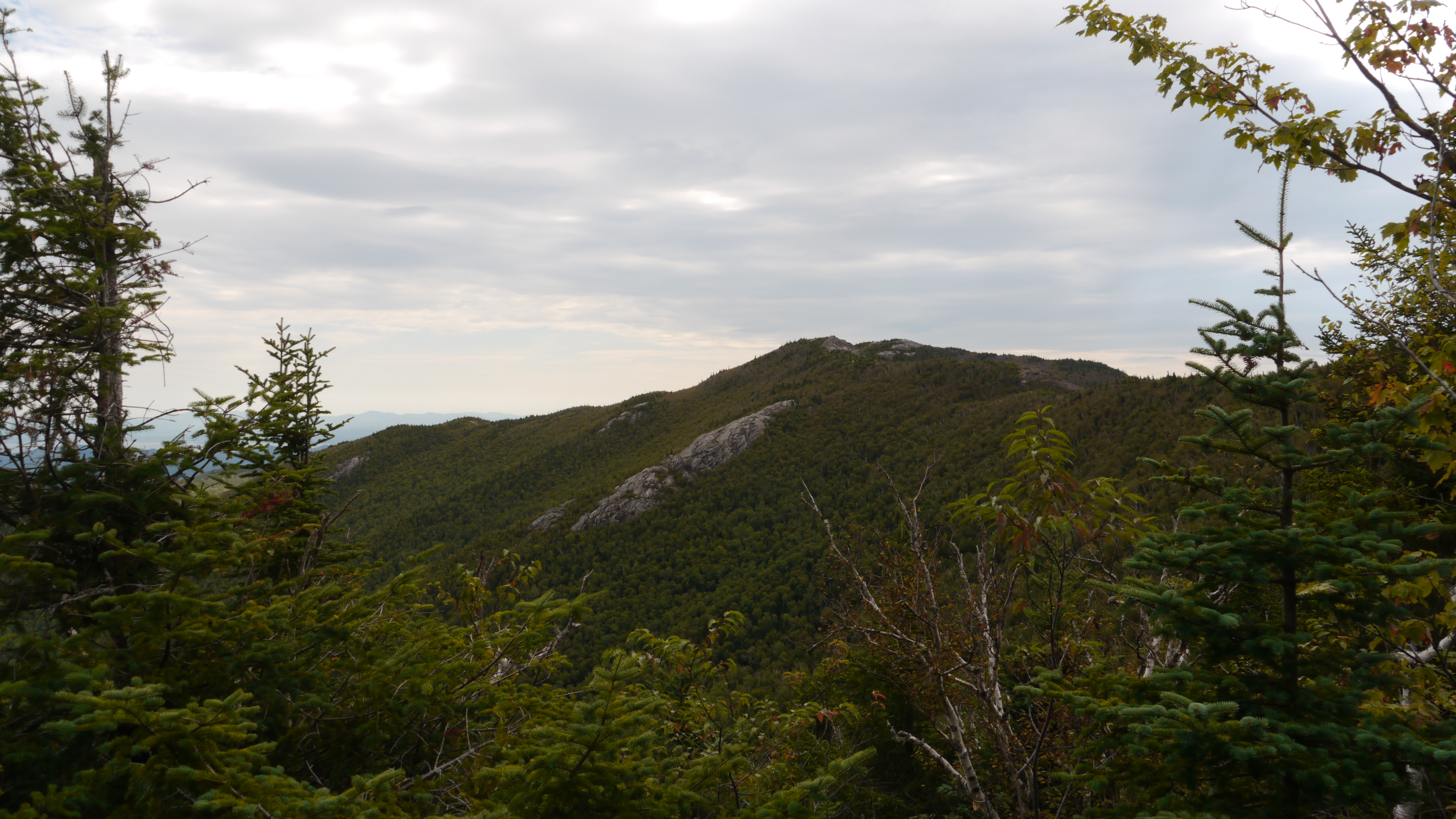
View of Jay Mountain highest peak from west belvedere

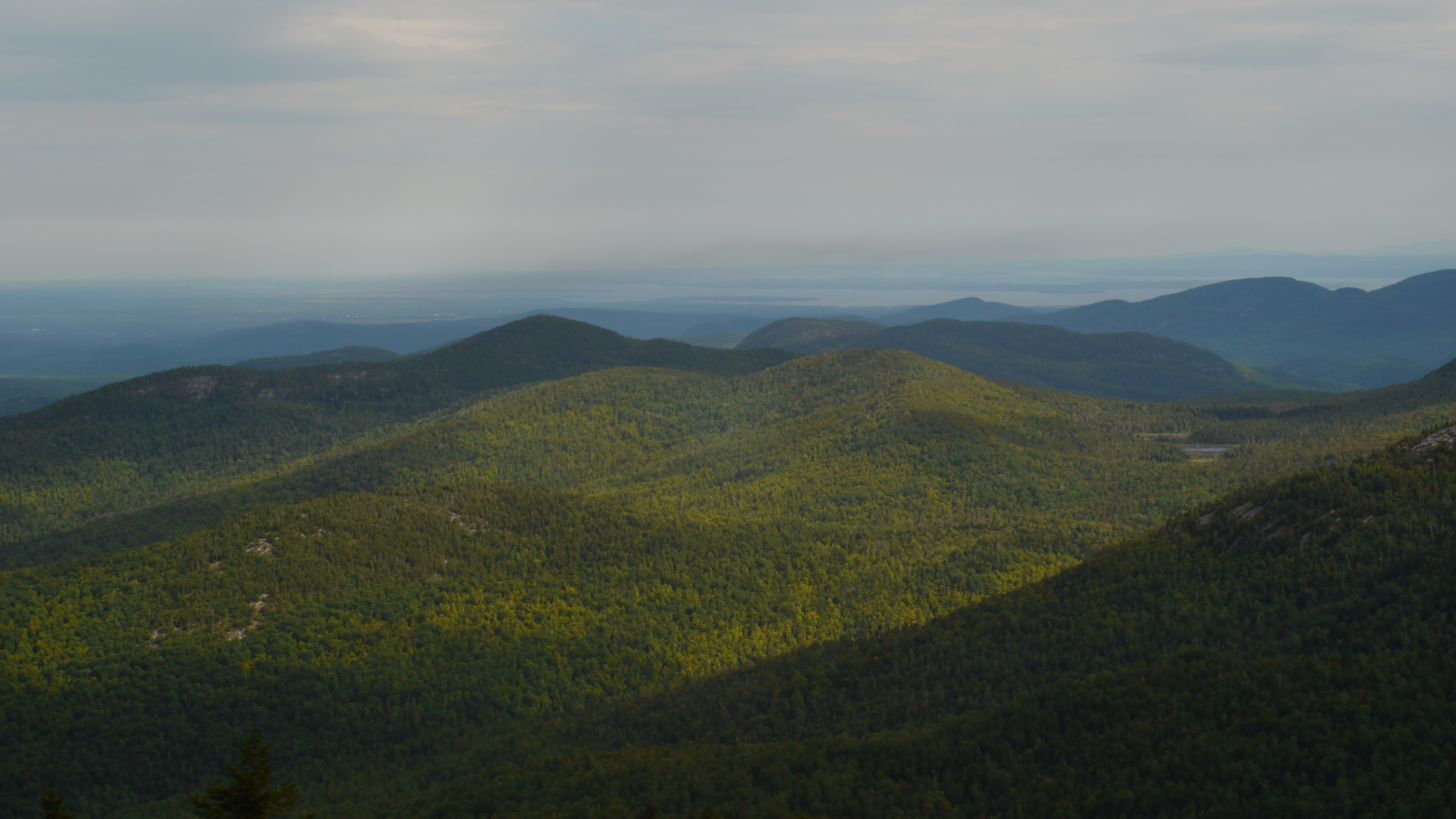
View from west belvedere with Champlain Lake in the background

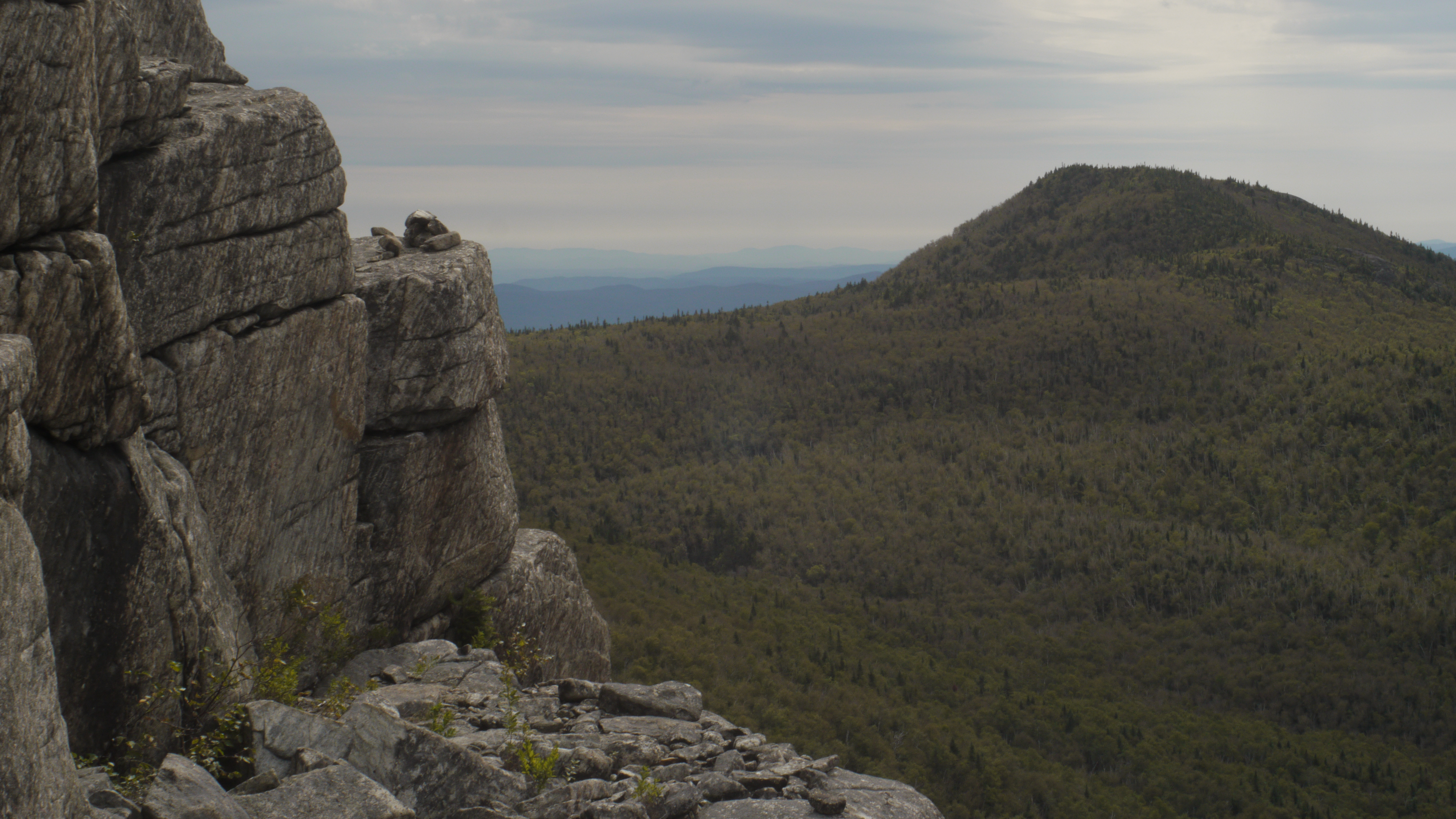
South-west view from Jay's ridge

== See also ==
- Jay Mountain Wilderness Area
- Adirondack Park
