= Jay Township =

Jay Township may refer to:

- Jay Township, Martin County, Minnesota
- Jay Township, Elk County, Pennsylvania
