= Jay Turner =

Jay Turner may refer to:

- Jay Turner (American football) (1914–1960), American football running back
- Jay Turner (cinematographer) (1896–1960), American cinematographer
- Jay Turner (Home and Away)
