= Jay Clayton (disambiguation) =

Jay Clayton (born 1966) is an American lawyer and United States Director of National Intelligence.

Jay Clayton may also refer to:

- Jay Clayton (critic) (born 1951), American literary critic
- Jay Clayton (musician) (1941–2023), American jazz vocalist and educator
- Jay Clayton (wrestler) (1941–2005), American professional wrestler
- Jay Clayton, English musician and songwriter in the band Crywank
