= Jay Bell (disambiguation) =

Jay Bell (born 1965) is an American professional baseball player.

Jay Bell may also refer to

- Jay Bell (writer) (born 1977), American writer
- Jay Bell (footballer) (born 1989), English footballer
