= Jay Henderson (basketball) =

American basketball player (born 1995)

Free agent
- Position: Shooting guard

Personal information
- Born: April 8, 1995 (age 31) Orlando, Florida, U.S.
- Listed height: 6 ft 6 in (1.98 m)
- Listed weight: 190 lb (86 kg)

Career information
- High school: Lake Highland Preparatory (Orlando, Florida)
- College: Louisville (2015–2017)
- NBA draft: 2019: undrafted
- Playing career: 2021–present

Career history
- 2021–2022: Sioux Falls Skyforce
- 2022: Oklahoma City Blue

Jay Henderson (born April 8, 1995) is an American professional basketball player who last played for the Oklahoma City Blue of the NBA G League. He played college basketball for The University of Louisville Cardinals.

== Early life ==
Henderson was born on April 8, 1995, in Orlando, Florida. He started playing travel basketball at the age of 8 when he joined the Orlando Raptors. At age 15, he was invited to play for Nike team Florida at the Nike EYBL league.

== High school career ==
Henderson played for his high school team while still in the 6th grade. He played alongside Joel Berry in the backcourt at Lake Highland Prep, winning back-to-back state championships in his junior and senior years.

Henderson was honored twice on the state all-tournament team. He ranked among the top 25 prospects in the state of Florida as a senior. He scored over 1,100 points in his final three seasons at Lake Highland Prep.

== College career ==
During his college years, Henderson played college basketball for Saint John's University, under coach Steve Lavin. He later moved to the University of Louisville, where he played alongside Damion Lee and Donovan Mitchell under coach Rick Pitino, for two years.

== Professional career ==
=== NBA Summer league (2019) ===
Henderson was invited to play in the NBA Summer League for the Indiana Pacers in the summer of 2019.

=== Sioux Falls Skyforce (2020 -2021) ===
Henderson got his first professional contract with the Miami Heat G-League affiliate, Sioux Falls Skyforce.

=== Oklahoma City Blue (2022 -2023) ===
Henderson was signed as a free agent with the Oklahoma City Blue, but was waived in December 2022.

== Awards and recognition ==
- Twice honored on the state all-tournament team
- Ranked among the top 25 prospects in the state of Florida as a senior
- Scored over 1,100 points in his final three seasons at Lake Highland Prep
- 2022 - Listed among Best performed former University of Louisville players in pro basketball.

== Personal life ==
Henderson owns an annual basketball camp known as Flow Shooting Academy which helps kids learn specifically about shooting in basketball. Jay has a younger brother Jacquez Henderson who is a professional basketball player for Oppsal Basket located in Norway He plays in the league of Norwegian Blno Division 1.
