= Jay Robinson (disambiguation) =

Jay Robinson (1930–2013) was an American actor.

Jay Robinson may also refer to:

- Jay Robinson (auto racing) (born 1959), American auto racing executive
- Jay Robinson (wrestler) (1946–2026), American wrestler
- Jay Robinson (footballer) (born 2007), English footballer
