= Jay Katz (disambiguation) =

Jay Katz may refer to:

- Jay Katz (1920–2008), American medical ethicist
- Jay Katz, nickname for Jaimie Leonarder
- Jay Katz pseudonym for Jim Keith

== See also ==
- Jay
- Katz (disambiguation)
