= Jay Leach (ice hockey, born 1979) =

American ice hockey player and coach

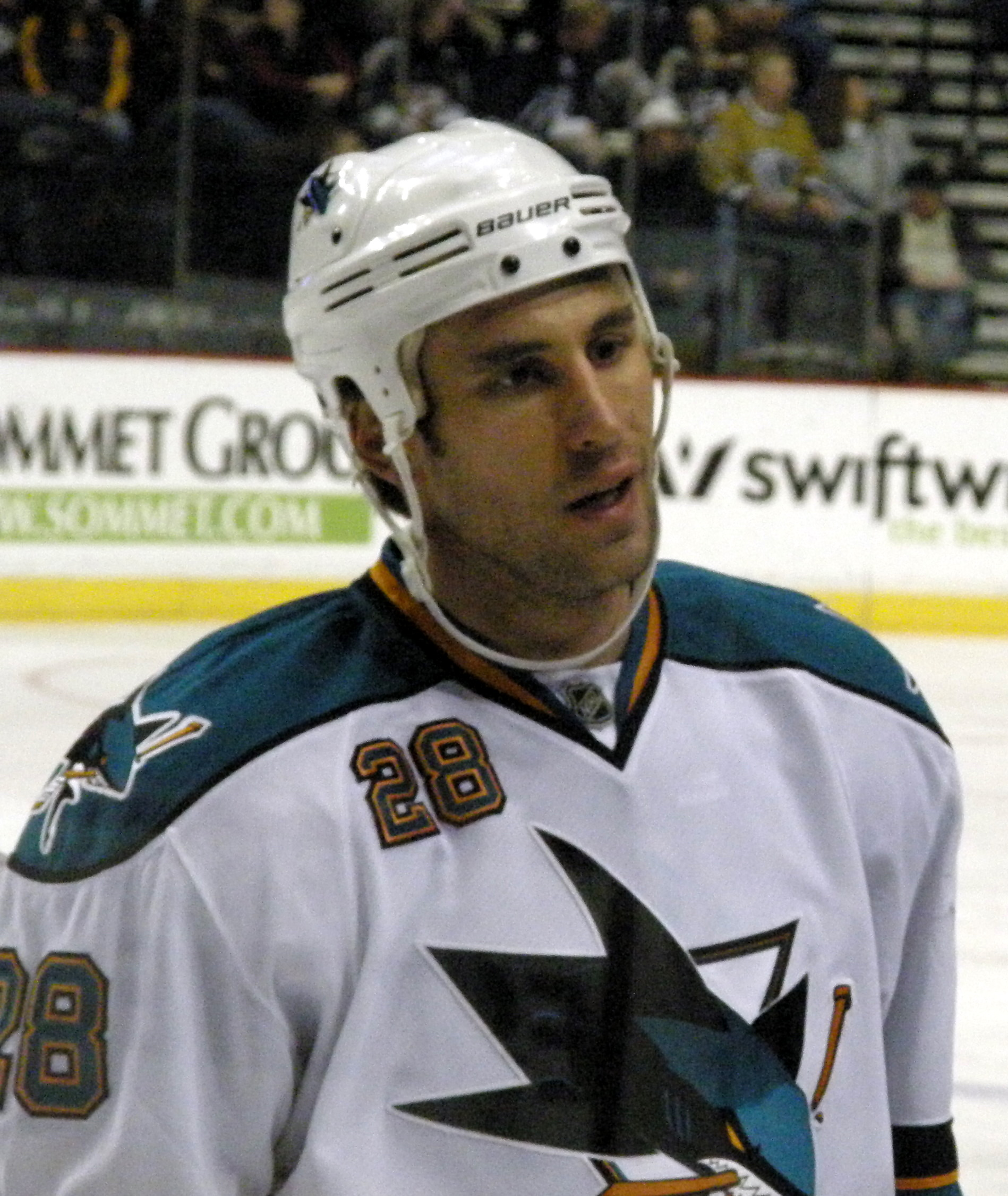
- Leach with the San Jose Sharks in 2010
- Born: September 2, 1979 (age 46) Syracuse, New York, U.S.
- Height: 6 ft 4 in (193 cm)
- Weight: 215 lb (98 kg; 15 st 5 lb)
- Position: Defense
- Shot: Left
- Played for: Boston Bruins; Tampa Bay Lightning; New Jersey Devils; Montreal Canadiens; San Jose Sharks
- National team: United States
- NHL draft: 115th overall, 1998; Phoenix Coyotes
- Playing career: 2001–2013

Jay Christopher Leach (born September 2, 1979) is an American former professional ice hockey player and current head coach of the Hartford Wolf Pack of the American Hockey League (AHL). He is a former captain of the Albany Devils.

== Playing career ==
Leach was drafted in the fifth round (115th overall) by the Phoenix Coyotes. After spending several years in minor hockey leagues, he signed as a free agent with the National Hockey League's Boston Bruins on September 26, 2003. While with the Bruins he appeared in his first two NHL games during the 2005–06 season, collecting no points and seven penalty minutes. Leach spent most of his time in the Bruins organization with their AHL affiliate in Providence. On July 3, 2007, he was signed as a free agent by the Tampa Bay Lightning. He played in two games for the Lightning during the 2007–08 season but spent most of the season in the AHL. On February 26, 2008 he was traded to the Anaheim Ducks. Later, during the summer of 2008 he signed with the New Jersey Devils. On November 6, 2009, Leach was claimed by the Montreal Canadiens on re-entry waivers from the Devils. On November 28, 2009, due to a high number of injuries to Canadiens forwards, Leach played forward instead of his usual defense position.

Leach was claimed off waivers by the San Jose Sharks on December 1, 2009, and he played 28 games for the Sharks during the season. He recorded his first NHL goal in an 8 to 5 victory over the visiting Nashville Predators on March 11, 2010. He began the 2010–11 season playing for the AHL's Worcester Sharks, but on February 9, 2011, he was traded back to the New Jersey Devils along with Steven Zalewski in exchange for Patrick Davis and Mike Swift.

== Coaching career ==
Leach became an assistant coach with Adler Mannheim of the Deutsche Eishockey Liga in 2014, helping the team in winning their sixth DEL Championship. On July 7, 2015, Leach was appointed as assistant coach to Mike Sullivan for the Wilkes-Barre/Scranton Penguins, affiliate of the Pittsburgh Penguins of the NHL. Leach was named interim head coach in December 2015 after Sullivan was promoted to be the head coach at Pittsburgh before settling into the position of associate head coach on a permanent basis to new Wilkes-Barre/Scranton head coach Clark Donatelli. Leach departed the Penguins after one season, eventually joining the Providence Bruins as an assistant coach on August 4, 2016. He would be promoted the P-Bruins head coach position prior to the 2017–18 season. In July 2021, the Seattle Kraken announced Leach as an assistant coach to Dave Hakstol for the Kraken's inaugural season. On June 12, 2024, Leach agreed to become an assistant coach with the Boston Bruins.

On June 5, 2026, it was announced that Leach was named the Head Coach of the Hartford Wolf Pack of the American Hockey League.

== Personal life ==
Leach is the nephew of both former NHL forward Stephen Leach and University of Maine hockey coach Jay Leach. He was married to Kathryn Tappen, an American sportscaster; they subsequently divorced in 2014.

== Career statistics ==
=== Regular season and playoffs ===
			Regular season					Playoffs
Season	Team	League	GP	G	A	Pts	PIM	GP	G	A	Pts	PIM
1997–98	Providence College	HE	32	0	8	8	29	—	—	—	—	—
1998–99	Providence College	HE	33	1	8	9	42	—	—	—	—	—
1999–00	Providence College	HE	37	1	9	10	101	—	—	—	—	—
2000–01	Providence College	HE	40	4	21	25	104	—	—	—	—	—
2001–02	Mississippi Sea Wolves	ECHL	70	3	13	16	116	10	1	1	2	8
2002–03	Augusta Lynx	ECHL	65	8	11	19	162	—	—	—	—	—
2002–03	Springfield Falcons	AHL	9	0	0	0	0	—	—	—	—	—
2003–04	Long Beach Ice Dogs	ECHL	3	0	1	1	4	—	—	—	—	—
2003–04	Providence Bruins	AHL	3	0	0	0	4	—	—	—	—	—
2003–04	Trenton Titans	ECHL	31	2	11	13	45	—	—	—	—	—
2003–04	Bridgeport Sound Tigers	AHL	23	0	1	1	33	7	0	1	1	10
2004–05	Trenton Titans	ECHL	11	0	2	2	17	—	—	—	—	—
2004–05	Providence Bruins	AHL	62	4	5	9	92	17	0	0	0	28
2005–06	Providence Bruins	AHL	71	5	11	16	100	6	0	1	1	15
2005–06	Boston Bruins	NHL	2	0	0	0	7	—	—	—	—	—
2006–07	Providence Bruins	AHL	73	2	5	7	128	13	0	4	4	13
2007–08	Norfolk Admirals	AHL	55	3	8	11	54	—	—	—	—	—
2007–08	Tampa Bay Lightning	NHL	2	0	0	0	0	—	—	—	—	—
2007–08	Portland Pirates	AHL	20	3	6	9	30	18	1	0	1	7
2008–09	Lowell Devils	AHL	24	2	4	6	29	—	—	—	—	—
2008–09	New Jersey Devils	NHL	24	0	1	1	21	—	—	—	—	—
2009–10	Lowell Devils	AHL	12	0	3	3	10	—	—	—	—	—
2009–10	Montreal Canadiens	NHL	7	0	0	0	5	—	—	—	—	—
2009–10	San Jose Sharks	NHL	28	1	1	2	20	—	—	—	—	—
2010–11	Worcester Sharks	AHL	50	1	4	5	45	—	—	—	—	—
2010–11	Albany Devils	AHL	16	1	3	4	8	—	—	—	—	—
2010–11	New Jersey Devils	NHL	7	0	0	0	7	—	—	—	—	—
2011–12	Albany Devils	AHL	21	0	2	2	12	—	—	—	—	—
2012–13	Albany Devils	AHL	60	4	10	14	63	—	—	—	—	—
NHL totals			70	1	2	3	60	—	—	—	—	—

=== International ===
Year	Team	Event	Result	GP	G	A	Pts	PIM
1998	United States	WJC	5th	7	0	1	1	8
Junior totals				7	0	1	1	8
