= J band (JRC) =

British term for a radio spectrum band

In the United Kingdom, the term J Band is used by the Joint Radio Company to refer to their VHF communications band at 139.5–140.5 and 148–149 MHz used by fuel and power industries.
