= Jay (disambiguation) =

A jay is a kind of colorful, noisy bird in the crow family.

Jay or JAY may also refer to:

== People ==
- Jay (given name)
- Jay (surname)
- Jay (French singer) (born 1979), R&B singer in trio Vigon Bamy Jay
- Jay (South African singer), stage name of South African singer Jaco du Plessis
- Jay (South Korean singer) (born 1983), stage name of singer Kim Kyun-woo
- Jay-Z (born 1969), stage name of American rapper Shawn Corey Carter
- Jay Khan (born 1982), British singer-songwriter, based in Germany
- Jays (Boston Celtics), basketball duo of Jayson Tatum and Jaylen Brown

=== Characters ===
- Jay (The Dumping Ground character)
- Jay (View Askewniverse)
- Jay (Ninjago)
- Jay (Witch Creek Road)
- Jay (Angry Birds)

== Place names ==
- Jay Peak (disambiguation), multiple locations
- Jay Mountain (disambiguation), multiple locations
- Jay Township (disambiguation), multiple locations

=== United Kingdom ===
- Jay, Herefordshire

=== United States ===
- Jay, Florida
- Jay City, Indiana
- Jay, Maine
- Jay, New York
- Jay, Oklahoma
- Jay, Vermont
- Jay County, Indiana

=== Indonesia ===
- Jayakarta railway station, a railway station in Jakarta, Indonesia

== Other uses ==
- J, a letter in the Latin alphabet
- Jay (album), 2000 album by Jay Chou
- Joint (cannabis), a cigarette rolled from marijuana
- Jay (locomotive), a South Devon Railway 0-4-0 steam locomotive
- Jays Foods, a manufacturer of snack foods
- Jay Funeral Home, listed on the National Register of Historic Places in Wapello County, Iowa, US
- Jaywalking, crossing the road where not allowed
- Toronto Blue Jays, a Canadian professional baseball team
- Jay, a large, metallic blue-green swallowtail butterfly in the genus Graphium

== See also ==
- J (disambiguation)
- Jay Jay (disambiguation)
- Jay bird (disambiguation)
- Blue jay (disambiguation)
- Jaya (disambiguation)
- Jai (disambiguation)
