= Jay Miller =

Jay Miller may refer to:

- Jay Miller (anthropologist), specializing in Native American groups
- Jay Miller (basketball) (1943–2001), former National Basketball League player
- Jay Miller (ice hockey) (born 1960), former National Hockey League player
- J. D. "Jay" Miller (1922–1996), American record producer, musician and songwriter
- Jay Miller (softball), American softball coach
- Jay Miller (theatre director), British theatre director and Artistic Director of the Yard Theatre
- Jay Miller (American football) (born 1954), American football player

== See also ==
- Miller (name)
