= Jay Jay (disambiguation) =

Jay Jay is a 2003 Tamil romance film.

Jay Jay or Jay-Jay may also refer to:

- Jay Jay the Jet Plane, an American live-action/CGI-animated children's television series
- Jay Jays, an Australian apparel chain store

== People ==
- Jay Jay Burridge (born 1971), British artist and television presenter
- Jay-Jay Feeney (born 1974), New Zealand radio host
- Jay Jay French (born 1952), founding member of the heavy metal band Twisted Sister
- Jay Jay Johnson (1924–2001), American jazz trombonist, composer and arranger
- Jay-Jay Johanson (born 1968), Swedish singer-songwriter
- Jay Jay Pistolet (born 1987), early stage name of English singer Justin Young
- Jay-Jay Solari, cast member of the original Mickey Mouse Club
- David "Jay-Jay" Suarez (born 1977), Filipino congressman of Quezon's 2nd district

== See also ==
- Jai (disambiguation)
- Jay (disambiguation)
