= Jay Greenberg (composer) =

American composer

Jay "Bluejay" Greenberg (born December 13, 1991) is an American composer and former child prodigy who studied at the Juilliard School pre-college in 2002 at age 10.

== Life and work ==
Greenberg was born in New Haven, Connecticut. He caught the attention of the American media through the sponsorship of Juilliard instructor Samuel Zyman during a CBS News 60 Minutes broadcast on November 28, 2004, when Greenberg was 12, and again in November 2006. Zyman told 60 Minutes, "We are talking about a prodigy of the level of the greatest prodigies in history, when it comes to composition. I am talking about the likes of Mozart, and Mendelssohn, and Saint-Saëns."

Greenberg's primary composition instructor was Samuel Adler.

He composes primarily on his computer using a music notation program. He is mostly known for his work Overture to 9-11 about the September 11, 2001 terrorist attacks, which was featured on PRI's From the Top. On 9/11, he was living in Republic of Macedonia but has since returned to the United States.

Neither his father, Robert Greenberg, a professor of Slavic languages at Yale University, nor his Israeli-born mother have musical backgrounds, but Greenberg found himself attracted to music from an early age, having begun playing the cello when he was two years old.

Greenberg has said he hears the music performed inside his head, like many composers, and often several musical pieces simultaneously. He is then able to simply notate what he has listened to, and rarely needs to make corrections to what he has notated.

The Sony Classical label released his first CD on August 15, 2006; it includes his Symphony No. 5 and String Quintet as performed by the London Symphony Orchestra under the direction of José Serebrier and by the Juilliard String Quartet with cellist Darrett Adkins respectively.

On October 28, 2007, Joshua Bell gave the premiere of Greenberg's Violin Concerto at Carnegie Hall, performing with the Orchestra of St. Luke's.

The 2011 contemporary classical album Troika includes Jay Greenberg's song "I still keep mute", setting a poem by Vladimir Nabokov.

Greenberg's works are published by G. Schirmer.

As of 2012, Greenberg was majoring in music at Peterhouse, Cambridge. As of 2016, he was pursuing a DMus degree at the University of Auckland, New Zealand, under the supervision of Eve de Castro-Robinson.

== Compositions ==
Greenberg's compositions include the following:

=== Orchestral ===
- Symphony No. 1 (2001-02?)
- Symphony No. 2 (2002-03?)
- Symphony No. 3 (2002-03?)
- Symphony No. 4 (2004?)
- Symphony No. 5 (2005)
- Intelligent Life (2006)
- Skyline Dances - A Terpsichorean Couplet (2009) (commissioned by a consortium of youth orchestras)

=== Concertante ===
- Concerto for Piano Trio and Orchestra (2007)
- Violin Concerto (2007), commissioned by Joshua Bell

=== Chamber works ===
- String Quintet (2004)
- Sonata for violoncello and piano (2004)
- Hexalogue for wind quintet and piano (2005)
- Four Scenes for double string quartet (2008)
- Quintet for Brass, op. 25 (2012)

=== Stage works ===
- Neon Refracted: Ballet for chamber orchestra (2009), commissioned by New York City Ballet
