= Jay Hill =

Jay Hill may refer to:

- Jay Hill (politician) (born 1952), Canadian politician
- Jay Hill (racing driver) (born 1964), American racing driver
- Jay Hill (American football) (born 1975), American football coach

== See also ==
- Jay Hillock (born c. 1949), American football
