= J (disambiguation) =

J, or j, is the tenth letter of the English alphabet.

J may also refer to:

== Alphabet characters ==
- J, Cyrillic letter Je
- ⟨j⟩, the voiced palatal approximant in the International Phonetic Alphabet
- ʲ, the symbol for palatalization in the IPA

== Arts and entertainment ==
=== Fictional characters ===
- Agent J, in the Men in Black films
- J, a Bobobo-bo Bo-bobo character
- Serial Designation "J", in 2021–2024 web series Murder Drones
- J, the narrator of Jerome K. Jerome's novel Three Men in a Boat

=== Film and television ===
- Canal J, a French children's television channel
- J, the production code for the 1964 Doctor Who serial Planet of Giants

=== Literature ===
- J (novel), by Howard Jacobson, 2014
- "J", a 1963 short story by Kenzaburō Ōe
- J. The Jewish News of Northern California, an American newspaper

=== Music ===
- J Records, a record label
- J (album), 2024
- "J", a song by Reggie and the Full Effect from the 2008 album Last Stop: Crappy Town
- "J", a song by Mindless Self Indulgence from the 2000 album Frankenstein Girls Will Seem Strangely Sexy

== People ==
- J (bassist) (Jun Onose, born 1970), Japanese rock musician
- J (South Korean singer) (Chung Jae-young, born 1977)
- J, pen name of Cornelia von Levetzow (1836–1921), Danish novelist
- J, a member of the K-pop group STAYC
- J., stage name of American White Zombie guitarist Jay Yuenger (fl. from 1982)
- J., stage name of German musician Jaye Muller (born 1967)
- J., a pseudonym of Jezper Söderlund (born 1980), Swedish record producer and electronic music artist
- J Dilla (James Dewitt Yancey, 1974–2006), American rapper
- J Mascis (Joseph Donald Mascis Jr, born 1965), American singer and guitarist of Dinosaur Jr.
- J Mays (born 1954), American industrial designer

== Science and technology ==
=== Astronomy ===
- J, a provisional designation in astronomy for objects discovered between May 1 and 15 of a year

=== Computing ===
- J (programming language)
- J# programming language for the Microsoft .NET Framework
- J operator, a programming construct
- J (operating system), for ICL's System 4 series of computers

=== Genetics and medicine ===
- Haplogroup J (mtDNA)
- Haplogroup J (Y-DNA)
- ATC code J Antiinfectives for systemic use, a section of the Anatomical Therapeutic Chemical Classification System

=== Mathematics ===
- J, symbol used to denote the Bessel function
- j or i, symbol for the imaginary unit ($\sqrt{-1}$)
- j, a hyperbolic unit in a split-complex numbers
- j, a basis vector of a quaternion
- j, an index variable in a matrix
- j-invariant, a modular function
- $J$, symbol for second moment of area for an axis perpendicular to the plane

=== Physics and chemistry ===
- J, symbol for Joule, the SI unit of energy
- $\mathsf{J}$, the dimension symbol for luminous intensity
- j →, symbol for current density
- J/psi meson, a subatomic particle
- J-coupling, indirect dipole-dipole coupling between two nuclear spins
- J, for Jod, chemical element iodine in German and early periodic tables
- J band (disambiguation), several uses

== Transportation ==
=== Rail ===
- J (Los Angeles Railway), in the United States
- J Line (Los Angeles Metro), in the United States
- J/Z (New York City Subway service), in the United States
- J Church, an urban rail transit line of the Muni Metro system in San Francisco, California, United States
- NZR J class (disambiguation), two classes of steam locomotive in New Zealand
- Line J on the Transilien Paris-Saint-Lazare in France
- , the Bantan Line in Asago City, Hyōgo Prefecture, Japan
- "The J", the Elgin, Joliet and Eastern Railway, in Indiana, United States

=== Road ===
- Saviem J, and Renault J, a range of medium-duty trucks
- Guy Big J, a 1964–1978 range of trucks by Guy Motors of England
- Lamborghini Aventador J, a 2012 soecial edition sports car

== Other uses ==
- J, slang for joint (cannabis)
- J, slang for a jump shot in basketball
- 1,3-Benzodioxolylbutanamine, or J, a psychedelic drug
- J, the international vehicle registration code for Japan
- J, the Postal code in Canada for the western and northern Quebec
- J, German Euro coin mint mark for Hamburg
- Jahwist (J), a widely recognized source of the Pentateuch
- J, abbreviated title of a High Court judge in England and Wales
- J, or Juliet, sometimes used a military time zone for local time

== See also ==
- Jay (disambiguation)
- Jay Jay (disambiguation)
- Jay-Z (Shawn Corey Carter, born 1969), American rapper
- JJJ (disambiguation)
- J/22, J/24 and J/80 sailboat classes
- Kamen Rider J, a Japanese movie
- "J" Is for Judgment, a 1993 Sue Grafton "Alphabet mystery" series novel
