= Jake (given name) =

- Pronunciation: /ˈdʒeɪk/
- Gender: Male

Origin
- Origin: Hebrew
- Meaning: "He may/will/shall follow/heed/seize-by-the-heel/watch/guard/protect”, "Supplanter/Assailant", "May God protect" or "May he protect"

Other names
- Usage: English
- Related names: Jack, Jacob, Jakey, Jakeb, James, Jacques, Jay

Jake is a masculine given name derived from Jacob. It can also be a nickname of Jacob and various other given names.

== People with the given name "Jake" include ==
=== A ===
- Jake Aarts (born 1994), Australian rules footballer
- Jake Abel (born 1987), American actor
- Jake Abel (rugby union) (born 1997), Australian rugby union footballer
- Jake Abbott (born 1988), English rugby union footballer
- Jake Abraham (1967–2023), British actor
- Jake Adams (pornographic actor) (1992–2021), American poronographic actor
- Jake Adelson (born 1996), Australian footballer
- Jake Adelstein (born 1969), American journalist
- Jake Adicoff (born 1995), American skier
- Jake Ahearn (1918–1968), American basketball player
- Jake Allen (disambiguation), multiple people
- Jake Allex (1887–1959), American soldier
- Jake Allston (born 1986), American sound designer
- Jake Allyn (born 1990), American actor
- Jake Alpert, British air force officer
- Jake Alu (born 1997), American baseball player
- Jake Anderegg, American politician
- Jake Anderson (disambiguation), multiple people
- Jake Andrewartha (born 1989), Australian judoka
- Jake Andrews (disambiguation), multiple people
- Jake Angeli (born 1988), American activist
- Jake Areman (born 1996), American soccer player
- Jake Arians (born 1978), American football player
- Jake Armerding, American musician
- Jake Armstrong (disambiguation), multiple people
- Jake Arnold (disambiguation), multiple people
- Jake Arnott (born 1961), British novelist
- Jake Arrieta (born 1986), American baseball player
- Jake Atlas (born 1994), American professional wrestler
- Jake Atz (1879–1945), American baseball player
- Jake Auchincloss (born 1988), American politician
- Jake Auerbach (born 1958), British filmmaker
- Jake T. Austin (born 1994), American actor
- Jake Averillo (born 2000), Australian rugby league footballer
- Jake Aydelott (1861–1926), American baseball player

=== B ===
- Jake Bailey (disambiguation), multiple people
- Jake Ball (disambiguation), multiple people
- Jake Ballard (born 1987), American football player
- Jake Ballestrino (born 1991), Australian Paralympic table tennis player
- Jake Banta (born 1965), American politician
- Jake Bargas (born 1996), American football player
- Jake Barker-Daish (born 1993), Australian footballer
- Jake Barrett (born 1991), American baseball player
- Jake Barrett (footballer) (born 1995), Australian rules footballer
- Jake Barton (born 1972), American designer
- Jake Batchelor (born 1992), Australian rules footballer
- Jake Bates (born 1999), American football player
- Jake Batty (born 2005), English footballer
- Jake Bauers (born 1995), American baseball player
- Jake Beale (born 2001), Canadian actor
- Jake Bean (born 1998), Canadian ice hockey player
- Jake Beckford (born 1994), Costa Rican footballer
- Jake Beckley (1867–1918), American baseball player
- Jake Beesley (born 1996), English footballer
- Jake Bennett (disambiguation), multiple people
- Jake Bensted (born 1994), Australian judoka
- Jake Bentley (born 1997), American football player
- Jake Bequette (born 1989), American football player
- Jake Bergey (born 1974), American lacrosse player
- Jake Bernstein (journalist) (born 1978), American journalist
- Jake Bernstein (market analyst) (born 1946), American market analyst
- Jake Berry (born 1978), British politician
- Jake Berthot (1939–2014), American artist
- Jake Bezzant (born 1987/1988), New Zealand politician
- Jake Bibby (born 1996), English rugby league footballer
- Jake Bible, American writer
- Jake Bickelhaupt, American chef
- Jake Bickerstaff (born 2001), English footballer
- Jake Bidwell (born 1993), English footballer
- Jake Bilardi (1996–2015), Australian terrorist
- Jake Bird (1901–1949), American serial killer
- Jake Bird (baseball) (born 1995), American baseball player
- Jake Bischoff (born 1994), American hockey player
- Jake Bissaillon (born 1987), American politician
- Jake Blackmore (??–1964), Welsh rugby league footballer
- Jake Blauvelt (born 1986), American snowboarder
- Jake Bloss (born 2001), American baseball player
- Jake Blount (born 1995), American musician
- Jake Blum (born 1994), American politician
- Jake Blumencranz (born 1996), American politician
- Jake Bobo (born 1998), American football player
- Jake Boer (born 1975), South African rugby union footballer
- Jake Bollman (born 2007), American stock car racing driver
- Jake Bongiovi (born 2002), American actor
- Jake Borelli (born 1991), American actor
- Jake Boritt, American filmmaker
- Jake Bornheimer (1927–1986), American basketball player
- Jake Borthwick (1912–2008), Scottish rugby league footballer
- Jake Boss (born 1971), American baseball coach
- Jake Boultes (1884–1955), American baseball player
- Jake Bowey (born 2002), Australian rules footballer
- Jake Boyd (1874–1932), American baseball player
- Jake Bredenbeck (born 1991), American racquetball player
- Jake Breeland (born 1997), American football player
- Jake Brendel (born 1992), American football player
- Jake Brennan (born 1974), American musician
- Jake Brentz (born 1994), American baseball player
- Jake Brewer (1981–2015), American political advisor
- Jake Brigham (born 1988), American baseball player
- Jake Brimmer (born 1998), Australian footballer
- Jake Briningstool (born 2002), American football player
- Jake Bronstein (born 1978), American entrepreneur
- Jake Brown (disambiguation), multiple people
- Jake Browning (born 1996), American football player
- Jake Buchanan (born 1989), American baseball player
- Jake Bugg (born 1994), English singer-songwriter
- Jake Burbage (born 1992), American actor
- Jake Burger (born 1996), American baseball player
- Jake Burns (disambiguation), multiple people
- Jake Burt (born 1996), American football player
- Jake Burton (born 2001), English footballer
- Jake Butcher (1936–2017), American politician
- Jake Butler (born 1984), New Zealand footballer
- Jake Butler-Fleming (born 1992), Australian rugby league footballer
- Jake Butt (born 1995), American football player
- Jake Buxton (born 1985), English footballer
- Jake Byrne (born 1990), American football player
- Jake Byrne (writer), Canadian writer

=== C ===
- Jake Cabell (born 1954), American football coach
- Jake Cain (born 2001), English footballer
- Jake Camarda (born 1999), American football player
- Jake Campos (born 1994), American football player
- Jake Cannavale (born 1995), American actor
- Jake Canter (born 2003), American snowboarder
- Jake Canuso (born 1970), Italian actor
- Jake Caprice (born 1992), English footballer
- Jake Carder (born 1995), Australian cricketer
- Jake Carlisle (born 1991), Australian rules footballer
- Jake Burton Carpenter (1954–2019), American snowboarder
- Jake Carroll (born 1991), Irish footballer
- Jake Carter (disambiguation), multiple people
- Jake Cassidy (born 1993), Welsh footballer
- Jake Caster (born 2000), American surfer
- Jake Caswell (born 1997), American runner
- Jake Caulfield (1917–1986), American baseball player
- Jake Cavaliere (born 1972), American musician
- Jake Cave (born 1992), American baseball player
- Jake Cawsey (born 1993), English footballer
- Jake Ceresna (born 1994), American football player
- Jake Chapman (politician) (born 1984), American politician
- Jake Charles (born 1996), English footballer
- Jake Chelios (born 1991), American ice hockey player
- Jake Childs, American record producer
- Jake Choi (born 1985), American actor
- Jake Christensen (born 1986), American football player
- Jake Cinninger (born 1975), American musician
- Jake Clarke-Salter (born 1997), English footballer
- Jake Clemons (born 1980), American singer-songwriter
- Jake Clifford (born 1998), Australian rugby league footballer
- Jake Cody (born 1988), English poker player
- Jake Cohen (born 1990), American-Israeli basketball player
- Jake Coker (born 1992), American football player
- Jake Cole (born 1985), English footballer
- Jake Colhouer (1922–1998), American football player
- Jake Collier (born 1988), American mixed martial artist
- Jake Cook (born 1993), British racing driver
- Jake H. Concepcion (1936–2017), Filipino saxophone player
- Jake Connelly (born 2012), American actor
- Jake Connor (born 1994), English rugby league footballer
- Jake Conroy (born 1976), American activist
- Jake Cooper (disambiguation), multiple people
- Jake Cooper-Woolley (born 1989), English rugby union footballer
- Jake Copass (1920–2006), American poet
- Jake Corbin (1964–1992), American adult actor
- Jake Corman (born 1964), American politician
- Jake Cousins (born 1994), American baseball player
- Jake Crawford (1928–2008), American baseball player
- Jake Cronenworth (born 1994), American baseball player
- Jake Crouthamel (1938–2022), American football player and coach
- Jake Crum (born 1991), American racing driver
- Jake Cuenca (born 1987), Filipino actor and model
- Jake Curhan (born 1998), American football player

=== D ===
- Jake Dalton (born 1991), American gymnast
- Jake Dan-Azumi, Nigerian professor
- Jake Dancy (born 1978), American soccer player
- Jake Daniel (1911–1996), American baseball player
- Jake Daniels (born 2005), English footballer
- Jake D'Arcy (1945–2015), Scottish actor
- Jake Daubert (1884–1924), American baseball player
- Jake Davidson (born 2000), Scottish footballer
- Jake Davis (disambiguation), multiple people
- Jake Day (1892–1983), American artist
- Jake DeBrusk (born 1996), Canadian ice hockey player
- Jake Deitchler (born 1989), American wrestler
- Jake Delaney (born 1997), Australian tennis player
- Jake Delhomme (born 1975), American football player
- Jake Dengler (born 1999), American soccer player
- Jake Dennis (born 1995), British racing driver
- Jake DeRosier (1880–1913), Canadian motorcycle racer
- Jake Dickert (born 1983), American football coach
- Jake Diebler (born 1986), American basketball coach
- Jake Diekman (born 1987), American baseball player
- Jake Dillon (born 1993), Irish hurler
- Jake Dixon (born 1996), British motorcycle racer
- Jake Dobkin, American journalist
- Jake Dodd (born 1995), Welsh boxer
- Jake Dolegala (born 1996), American football player
- Jake Donaghey (born 1994), Australian canoeist
- Jake Doran (born 1996), Australian cricketer
- Jake Doran (athlete) (born 2000), Australian athlete
- Jake Dotchin (born 1994), Canadian ice hockey player
- Jake Dowell (born 1985), American ice hockey player
- Jake Doyle-Hayes (born 1998), Irish footballer
- Jake Drake-Brockman (1955–2009), English musician
- Jake Drauby (1864–1916), American baseball player
- Jake Drew (born 2000), American stock car racing driver
- Jake Dreyer (born 1992), American musician
- Jake Duncombe (born 1988), Australian skateboarder
- Jake Dunford (born 1994), Jersey cricketer
- Jake Dunlap (1925–2010), Canadian football player
- Jake Dunn (1909–1984), American baseball player
- Jake Dunning (born 1988), American baseball player
- Jake Dunwoody (born 1998), English footballer

=== E ===
- Jake Early (1915–1985), American baseball player
- Jake Eastwood (born 1996), English footballer
- Jake Eaton (born 1981), American football player
- Jake Eberts (1941–2012), Canadian film producer
- Jake Eccleston (born 1995), English rugby league footballer
- Jake Eckert (born 1976), American musician
- Jake Eder (born 1998), American baseball player
- Jake Edwards (disambiguation), multiple people
- Jake Okechukwu Effoduh (born 1987), Nigerian radio personality
- Jake Ehrlich (1900–1971), American lawyer
- Jake Eidson (born 1995), Australian-American racing driver
- Jake Eisenhart (1922–1987), American baseball player
- Jake Ejercito (born 1990), Filipino actor
- Jake Elder (1936–2010), American racing driver
- Jake Eldrenkamp (born 1994), American football player
- Jake Ellenberger (born 1985), American mixed martial artist
- Jake Elliott (born 1995), American football player
- Jake Ellis, American politician
- Jake Ellwood (born 1970), Australian army officer
- Jake Ellzey (born 1970), American politician
- Jake Elmore (born 1987), American baseball player
- Jake Elwes (born 1993), British media artist
- Jake Epp (1939–2025), Canadian executive and politician
- Jake Epstein (born 1987), Canadian actor and singer
- Jake Esch (born 1990), American baseball player
- Jake Evans (disambiguation), multiple people
- Jake Ewald (born 1993), American musician

=== F ===
- Jake Factor (1892–1984), British-American Prohibition-era gangster
- Jake Faria (born 1993), American baseball player
- Jake Farrow (born 1972), American actor
- Jake Fawcett (born 1990), Australian cricketer
- Jake Fendley (1929–2002), American basketball player
- Jake Fette, American football player
- Jake Fey (born 1949), American politician
- Jake Fiechter (born 1946), American rower
- Jake Figueroa (born 2002), Filipino basketball player
- Jake Files (born 1972), American politician
- Jake Finch (born 2005), American stock car racing driver
- Jake Findlay (1954–2025), Scottish footballer
- Jake Fisher (born 1993), American football player
- Jake Fisher (judge) (1871–1951), American judge
- Jake Fishman (born 1995), American-Israeli baseball player
- Jake Fitisemanu (born 1982), New Zealand-American politician
- Jake Freeman (born 1980), American hammer thrower
- Jake Fried (born 1984), American artist
- Jake Friend (born 1990), Australian rugby league footballer
- Jake Fromm (born 1998), American football player
- Jake Funk (born 1998), American football player
- Jake Ferguson (born 1999), American football player
- Jake Flake (1935–2008), American politician
- Jake Flannery (born 1999), Irish rugby union footballer
- Jake Flannigan (born 1996), English footballer
- Jake Flint (1985–2022), American singer
- Jake Florenca (born 1997), Australian rules footballer
- Jake Flowers (1902–1962), American baseball player
- Jake Fogelnest (born 1979), American writer
- Jake Foley (born 1994), English cricketer
- Jake Forbes (disambiguation), multiple people
- Jake Ford (1946–1996), American basketball player
- Jake Ford (gridiron football) (born 1993), American football player
- Jake Forster-Caskey (born 1994), English footballer
- Jake Foster (born 1988), Australian rugby league footballer
- Jake Foster (swimmer) (born 2000), American swimmer
- Jake Fox (born 1982), American baseball player
- Jake Fox (lacrosse) (born 1996), American lacrosse player
- Jake Fraley (born 1995), American baseball player
- Jake Francis (born 1989), American stock car racing driver
- Jake Fraser-McGurk (born 2002), Australian cricketer
- Jake Freeze (1900–1983), American baseball player
- Jake Froese (1925–2013), Canadian politician
- Jake Xerxes Fussell (born 1981), American singer

=== G ===
- Jake Gagne (born 1993), American motorcycle racer
- Jake Gaither (1903–1994), American football coach
- Jake Galea (born 1996), Maltese footballer
- Jake Gannon (born 1987), American ice hockey player
- Jake Garber (born 1965), American make-up artist
- Jake Garcia (born 2005), American racing driver
- Jake Gardiner (born 1990), American ice hockey player
- Jake Garn (born 1932), American politician
- Jake Garrett (born 2003), English footballer
- Jake Garside (born 2002), English rugby union footballer
- Jake Gaudaur (1920–2007), Canadian football player
- Jake Gelof (born 2002), American baseball player
- Jake George (born 1994), English cricketer
- Jake Gervase (born 1995), American football player
- Jake Gettman (1875–1956), American baseball player
- Jake Gibb (born 1976), American beach volleyball player
- Jake Gibbs (born 1938), American baseball player
- Jake Gibson (born 1997), New Zealand cricketer
- Jake Gilbert (born 1976), American football coach
- Jake Gill (born 1976), American singer-songwriter
- Jake Girdwood-Reich (born 2004), Australian footballer
- Jake Gleeson (born 1990), New Zealand footballer
- Jake Godbold (1933–2020), American politician
- Jake Gold (born 1958), American-Canadian music manager
- Jake Golday (born 2003), American football player
- Jake Goebbert (born 1987), American baseball player
- Jake Goldberg (born 1996), American actor
- Jake Goldberger (born 1977), American filmmaker
- Jake Goldsbie (born 1988), Canadian actor
- Jake Goodman (disambiguation), multiple people
- Jake Goodwin (born 1998), English cricketer
- Jake Gordon (born 1993), Australian rugby union footballer
- Jake Gosling, English music producer
- Jake Gosling (footballer) (born 1993), English footballer
- Jake Graf (born 1979), English actor
- Jake Granville (born 1989), Australian rugby league footballer
- Jake Gray (disambiguation), multiple people
- Jake Grech (born 1997), Maltese footballer
- Jake Green (disambiguation), multiple people
- Jake Grey (1984–2021), Samoan rugby union footballer
- Jake Griffin (born 1998), American stock car racing driver
- Jake Grove (born 1980), American football player
- Jake Guentzel (born 1994), American ice hockey player
- Jake Guzik (1886–1956), American mobster
- Jake Gyllenhaal (born 1980), American actor

=== H ===
- Jake Haberfield (born 1986), Australian cricketer
- Jake Hackett (born 2000), English footballer
- Jake Haener (born 1999), American football player
- Jake Hall (born 2007), American basketball player
- Jake Hall (TV personality) (1990–2026), English television personality
- Jake Hallum (1938–2015), American football coach
- Jake Halpern (born 1975), American writer
- Jake Hamilton (musician) (born 1979), American singer-songwriter
- Jake Hammond (born 1991), Australian sprinter
- Jake Hamon (disambiguation), multiple people
- Jake Hancock (1928–2004), English geologist
- Jake Hancock (cricketer) (born 1991), Australian cricketer
- Jake Hanna (1931–2010), American drummer
- Jake Hanrahan (born 1990), British journalist
- Jake Hansen (disambiguation), multiple people
- Jake Hanson (American football) (born 1997), American football player
- Jake Harders (born 1976), English actor
- Jake Hartford (1949–2013), American radio host
- Jake Harty (born 1991), Canadian football player
- Jake Harvie (born 1998), Australian field hockey player
- Jake Hastie (born 1999), Scottish footballer
- Jake Hausmann (born 1998), American football player
- Jake Heaps (born 1991), American football player
- Jake Hecht (born 1984), American mixed martial artist
- Jake Heenan (born 1992), New Zealand rugby union footballer
- Jake Heggie (born 1961), American composer
- Jake Hehl (1899–1961), American baseball player
- Jake Heimlicher (born 1999), American football player
- Jake Helgren (born 1981), American film producer
- Jake Hendriks (born 1981), English actor
- Jake Herbert (born 1985), American wrestler
- Jake Herslow (born 1998), American football player
- Jake Hesketh (born 1996), English footballer
- Jake Hess (1927–2004), American singer
- Jake Hessenthaler (born 1994), English footballer
- Jake Hewitt (1870–1959), American baseball player
- Jake Heyward (born 1999), Welsh runner
- Jake Higginbottom (born 1993), Australian golfer
- Jake Higgs (born 1975), Canadian curler
- Jake High, American football player
- Jake Highfill (born 1990), American politician
- Jake Hildebrand (born 1993), American ice hockey player
- Jake Hill (disambiguation), multiple people
- Jake Hirst (disambiguation), multiple people
- Jake Hobgood (born 1975), American stock car racing driver
- Jake Hoeppner (1936–2015), Canadian politician
- Jake Hoffman (disambiguation), multiple people
- Jake Holden (born 1987), Canadian snowboarder
- Jake Hollman (born 2001), Australian footballer
- Jake Holmes (born 1939), American singer-songwriter
- Jake Hook, English songwriter
- Jake Hooker (disambiguation), multiple people
- Jake Hoot (born 1988), American singer
- Jake Howard (1945–2015), Australian rugby league footballer
- Jake Howe (born 1991), Australian wheelchair rugby union footballer
- Jake Howells (born 1991), British footballer
- Jake Hughes (born 1994), British racing driver
- Jake Hull (born 2001), English footballer
- Jake Hummel (born 1999), American football player
- Jake Humphrey (born 1978), English sports television presenter
- Jake Hurwitz (born 1985), American comedian
- Jake Hutson (born 1994), English cricketer
- Jake Hyde (born 1990), English professional footballer

=== I ===
- Jake Iceton (1903–1981), English footballer
- Jake Ilardi (born 1997), American skateboarder
- Jake Ilnicki (born 1992), Canadian rugby union footballer
- Jake Inglis (born 1989), Canadian soccer player
- Jake Ingram (born 1985), American football player
- Jake Ireland (born 1946), Canadian football referee
- Jake Irvin (born 1997), American baseball player

=== J ===
- Jake Jabs (born 1930), American businessman
- Jake Jacob (1902–1996), English rugby union footballer
- Jake Jacobs (1937–2010), American baseball player
- Jake Jacobson (1940–2021), American businessman
- Jake Jaeckel (born 1942), American baseball player
- Jake Jarman (born 2001), English artistic gymnast
- Jake Jervis (born 1991), English footballer
- Jake Jewell (born 1993), American baseball player
- Jake Johannsen (born 1960), American comedian
- Jake Johnson (disambiguation), multiple people
- Jake Jones (disambiguation), multiple people
- Jake Josvanger (1908–1966), Canadian politician
- Jake Julien (born 1998), Canadian football player

=== K ===
- Jake Kafora (1888–1928), American baseball player
- Jake Kalish (born 1991), American baseball player
- Jake Kambos (born 1999), Greek rugby league footballer
- Jake Kaminski (born 1988), American archer
- Jake Kaner (born 1959), American academic administrator
- Jake Kasdan (born 1974), American filmmaker
- Jake Kaufman (born 1981), American music composer
- Jake Kean (born 1991), English footballer
- Jake Keegan (born 1991), American soccer player
- Jake Kelchner (born 1970), American football player
- Jake Kelly (disambiguation), multiple people
- Jake Keough (born 1987), American cyclist
- Jake Kerr (disambiguation), multiple people
- Jake Kilrain (1859–1937), American heavyweight boxer
- Jake Kilrain (British boxer) (1914–1984), Scottish boxer
- Jake King (born 1984), Australian rules footballer
- Jake King (footballer, born 1955) (born 1955), Scottish footballer
- Jake Kirby (born 1994), English footballer
- Jake Kirkpatrick (born 1987), American football player
- Jake Knapp (disambiguation), multiple people
- Jake Knotts (born 1944), American politician
- Jake Knowdell (1852–1887), American baseball player
- Jake Koehler (born 1991), American YouTuber
- Jake Kolodjashnij (born 1995), Australian rules footballer
- Jake Kostecki (born 2000), Australian racing driver
- Jake Kozloff (1901–1976), Russian-American businessman
- Jake Krack (born 1984), American fiddler
- Jake Krull (1938–2016), American military officer
- Jake Kubas (born 2000), American football player
- Jake Kumerow (born 1992), American football player
- Jake Kupp (born 1941), American football player
- Jake Kuresa (born 1983), American football player

=== L ===
- Jake La Botz (born 1968), American singer-songwriter
- Jake LaCava (born 2001), American soccer player
- Jake Lacy (born 1985), American actor
- Jake La Furia (born 1979), Italian rapper
- Jake Landry (born 1988), American football coach
- Jake Lang (born 1995), American political influencer
- Jake Lansky (1905–1983), American mobster
- Jake Lamar (born 1961), American writer
- Jake Lamb (born 1990), American football player
- Jake LaMotta (1922–2017), American boxer
- Jake Lampman (born 1993), American football player
- Jake Lanum (1896–1968), American football player
- Jake Lappin (born 1992), Australian wheelchair runner
- Jake Larkins (born 1994), English footballer
- Jake Larson (1922–2025), American soldier
- Jake Larsson (born 1999), Swedish footballer
- Jake LaTurner (born 1988), American politician
- Jake Lawlor (disambiguation), multiple people
- Jake Layman (born 1994), American basketball player
- Jake Leake (born 2003), English footballer
- Jake LeDoux (born 1985), Canadian actor
- Jake Lee (disambiguation), multiple people
- Jake Leeker (born 1995), American soccer player
- Jake Lehmann (born 1992), Australian cricketer
- Jake Leicht (1919–1992), American football player
- Jake Leinenkugel (born 1952), American businessman and politician
- Jake Leith (born 1958), English businessman
- Jake Lemmerman (born 1989), American baseball player
- Jake Lemoine (born 1993), American baseball player
- Jake Leschyshyn (born 1999), American-Canadian ice hockey player
- Jake Lever (born 1996), Australian rules footballer
- Jake Levine (born 1984), American lawyer and politician
- Jake Libby (born 1993), English cricketer
- Jake Lilley (born 1993), Australian sailor
- Jake Lindsey (disambiguation), multiple people
- Jake Lingle (1891–1930), American reporter
- Jake Lintott (born 1993), English cricketer
- Jake Livanavage (born 2004), American ice hockey player
- Jake Livermore (born 1989), English footballer
- Jake Livingstone (1880–1949), Russian-American baseball player
- Jake Livingstone (ice hockey) (born 1999), Canadian ice hockey player
- Jake Lloyd (disambiguation), multiple people
- Jake Locker (born 1988), American football player
- Jake Lodwick (born 1981), American software engineer
- Jake Logan (wrestler) (born 1993), American professional wrestler
- Jake Logue (born 1972), American football player
- Jake Long (disambiguation), multiple people
- Jake Longstreth (born 1977), American painter
- Jake Lowery (born 1990), American baseball coach
- Jake Lucas (born 2002), American child actor
- Jake Lucchini (born 1995), Canadian ice hockey player
- Jake Ludington (born 1973), American writer
- Jake Luhrs (born 1985), American musician
- Jake Luton (born 1996), American football player
- Jake Lynch (born 1965), British journalist

=== M ===
- Jake Macapagal (born 1965/1966), Filipino actor
- Jake MacDonald (1949–2020), Canadian author
- Jake MacMillan (1924–2014), British scientist
- Jake Madden (1865–1948), Scottish footballer
- Jake Maier (born 1997), Canadian football player
- Jake Maizen (born 1997), Italian rugby league footballer
- Jake Majors (born 2002), American football player
- Jake Malone (born 1996), Irish hurler
- Jake Maltby (born 2000), English footballer
- Jake Mamo (born 1994), Australian rugby league footballer
- Jake Mangum (born 1996), American baseball player
- Jake Manley (born 1991), Canadian actor
- Jake Marisnick (born 1991), American baseball player
- Jake Marketo (born 1989), Australian rugby league footballer
- Jake Marosz (born 1952), American stock car racing driver
- Jake Marshall (born 1998), American surfer
- Jake Maskall (born 1971), English actor
- Jake Mason (born 1977), Australian musician
- Jake Mathews (born 1971), Canadian singer-songwriter
- Jake Matthews (disambiguation), multiple people
- Jake Mauer (born 1978), American baseball player
- Jake McCabe (born 1993), American ice hockey player
- Jake McCalmon (born 1986), American politician
- Jake McCandless (1930–2007), American athletics coach
- Jake McCarthy (born 1997), American baseball player
- Jake McCarthy (rower) (born 1996), Irish rower
- Jake McClure (1900/1903–1940), American rancher
- Jake McCoy (1942–2021), American ice hockey player
- Jake McCullough (born 1965), American football player
- Jake McDonough (born 1989), American football player
- Jake McDorman (born 1986), American actor
- Jake McGann (born 1990), English actor
- Jake McGee (born 1986), American baseball player
- Jake McGee (American football) (born 1991), American football player
- Jake McGing (born 1994), Australian footballer
- Jake McGoldrick, American teacher
- Jake McGuire (born 1994), American soccer player
- Jake McIntyre (born 1994), Australian rugby union footballer
- Jake McKinlay (2001–2021), New Zealand basketball player
- Jake McLaughlin (born 1982), American actor
- Jake McLeod (born 1994), Australian golfer
- Jake McNiece (1919–2013), American soldier
- Jake McQuaide (born 1987), American football player
- Jake Medwell (born 1988), American venture capitalist
- Jake Melksham (born 1991), Australian rules footballer
- Jake Merklinger (born 2005), American football player
- Jake A. Merrick (born 1981), American politician
- Jake Metz (born 1991), American football player
- Jake Meyer (born 1984), British mountaineer
- Jake Meyers (born 1996), American baseball player
- Jake Michel (born 1997), Australian Paralympic swimmer
- Jake Milford (1914–1984), Canadian ice hockey player
- Jake Millar (1995–2021), New Zealand entrepreneur
- Jake Miller (disambiguation), multiple people
- Jake Milliman (born 1947), American professional wrestler
- Jake Minshull (born 2004), British hurdler
- Jake Mitchell (born 2001), American swimmer
- Jake Monaco (born 1982), American composer
- Jake Moody (born 1999), American football player
- Jake Mooty (1912–1970), American baseball player
- Jake Moreland (born 1977), American football player
- Jake Morley (born 1983), British singer-songwriter
- Jake Morris (disambiguation), multiple people
- Jake Morton (born 1969), American basketball coach
- Jake Mosser, American actor
- Jake Mulford (born 2004), English racing driver
- Jake Mullaney (born 1990), Australian rugby league footballer
- Jake Mulraney (born 1996), Irish footballer
- Jake Munch (1890–1966), American baseball player
- Jake Murphy (born 1989), American football player
- Jake Muxworthy (born 1978), American actor
- Jake Muzzin (born 1989), Canadian ice hockey player

=== N ===
- Jake Nagode (1915–1976), American basketball player
- Jake Najdovski (born 2005), Australian soccer player
- Jake Najor (born 1978), American drummer
- Jake Nava (born 1969), British music director
- Jake Neade (born 1994), Australian rules footballer
- Jake Needham (disambiguation), multiple people
- Jake Nerwinski (born 1994), American soccer player
- Jake Nevin (1910–1985), American athletic trainer
- Jake Newberry (born 1994), American baseball player
- Jake Newton (disambiguation), multiple people
- Jake Neighbours (born 2002), Canadian ice hockey player
- Jake Niall, American sports journalist
- Jake Nicholson (born 1992), English footballer
- Jake Noll (born 1994), American baseball player
- Jake Nordin (born 1984), American football player
- Jake Norris (born 1999), British athlete
- Jake Northrop (1888–1945), American baseball player
- Jake Nulph (born 1982), American athletic administrator

=== O ===
- Jake O'Brien (disambiguation), multiple people
- Jake O'Connell (born 1985), American football player
- Jake Odey-Jordan (born 2007), British sprinter
- Jake O'Donnell (born 1937), American basketball referee
- Jake Odorizzi (born 1990), American baseball player
- Jake Odum (born 1991), American basketball coach
- Jake Oettinger (born 1998), American ice hockey player
- Jake Offiler, English rower
- Jake O'Kane (born 1961), Northern Irish comedian
- Jake Olson (born 1989), American football player
- Jake One (born 1976), American record producer
- Jake Ootes (born 1942), Canadian politician
- Jake Orrell (born 1997), English footballer
- Jake Ouimet (born 1973), American soccer player
- Jake Owen (born 1981), American singer-songwriter

=== P ===
- Jake Packard (born 1994), Australian swimmer
- Jake Palisch (born 1998), American baseball player
- Jake Paltrow (born 1975), American film director
- Jake Paque (born 1985), American voice actor
- Jake Paringatai (born 1980), New Zealand rugby union footballer
- Jake Parker (born 1977), American comic book writer
- Jake Parsons (born 1994), Australian racing driver
- Jake Pascual (born 1988), Filipino basketball player
- Jake Passmore (born 2005), Irish diver
- Jake Pates (born 1998), American snowboarder
- Jake Paul (born 1997), American professional boxer
- Jake Pavelka (born 1978), American television personality
- Jake Peavy (born 1981), American baseball player
- Jake Peck (born 2000), English footballer
- Jake Peetz (born 1983), American football coach
- Jake Pelkington (1916–1982), American basketball player
- Jake Pemberton (born 1996), American-Israeli basketball player
- Jake Petricka (born 1988), American baseball player
- Jake Phelps (1962–2019), American skateboarder
- Jake Picking (born 1991), American actor
- Jake Pitler (1894–1968), American baseball player
- Jake Pitts (born 1985), American guitarist
- Jake Plummer (born 1974), American football player
- Jake Polledri (born 1995), English rugby union footballer
- Jake Pollock, American cinematographer
- Jake Porter (1916–1993), American trumpeter
- Jake Powell (1908–1948), American baseball player
- Jake Pratt (born 1996), English actor
- Jake Propst (1895–1967), American baseball player
- Jake Pugh (born 1960), British businessman and politician
- Jake Putnam (born 1956), American journalist

=== Q ===
- Jake Quickenden (born 1988), English singer

=== R ===
- Jake Raburn (born 1985), American politician
- Jake Rathwell (born 1947), Canadian ice hockey player
- Jake Reed (disambiguation), multiple people
- Jake Reeves (born 1993), English footballer
- Jake Reinhart, American photographer
- Jake Reinhart (Canadian football) (born 1989), Canadian football player
- Jake Renfro (born 2002), American football player
- Jake Resnicow, American event producer
- Jake Retzlaff (born 2003), American football player
- Jake Riccardi (born 1999), Australian rules footballer
- Jake Richards (disambiguation), multiple people
- Jake Richardson (born 1985), American actor
- Jake Riley (runner) (born 1988), American runner
- Jake Riviera (born 1948), British entrepreneur
- Jake Robbins (born 1976), American baseball player
- Jake Roberts (born 1955), American professional wrestler
- Jake Roberts (film editor) (born 1977), English film editor
- Jake Robertson (born 1989), New Zealand runner
- Jake Robertson (musician), Australian musician
- Jake Robinson (born 1986), English footballer
- Jake Robinson (rugby union) (born 1988), Canadian rugby union footballer
- Jake Rodenhouse (born 1982), American record producer
- Jake Rodgers (born 1991), American football player
- Jake Rodkin, American video game designer
- Jake Rodríguez (born 1965), Puerto Rican boxer
- Jake Rogers (disambiguation), multiple people
- Jake Rooney (born 2003), English footballer
- Jake Roos (born 1980), South African golfer
- Jake Roper (born 1987), American social media entrepreneur
- Jake Rosenzweig (born 1989), English racing driver
- Jake Rosholt (born 1982), American mixed martial artist
- Jake Roxas (born 1977), Filipino actor
- Jake Rozhansky (born 1996), American-Israeli soccer player
- Jake Rudock (born 1993), American football player
- Jake Ruby (born 2000), Canadian soccer player
- Jake Rucker (born 1999), American baseball player
- Jake Ruecroft (1915–2005), English footballer
- Jake Rufe (born 1996), American soccer player
- Jake Runestad (born 1986), American composer
- Jake Rush, American attorney
- Jake Ryan (disambiguation), multiple people

=== S ===
- Jake Sagare (born 1980), American soccer player
- Jake Sanchez (born 1989), Mexican-American baseball player
- Jake Sanderson (born 2002), Canadian-American ice hockey player
- Jake Sasseville (born 1985), American entrepreneur
- Jake Saunders (1917–2002), English banking executive
- Jake Saunders (writer) (born 1947), American author
- Jake Sawatzky (born 2000), Canadian politician
- Jake Sawyer, American politician
- Jake Schaffner (born 2004), American baseball player
- Jake Schatz (born 1990), Australian rugby union footballer
- Jake Scheiner (born 1995), American baseball player
- Jake Schifino (born 1979), American football player
- Jake Schindler (born 1989), American poker player
- Jake Schreier (born 1981), American film director
- Jake Schuehle (1917–2001), American football player
- Jake Schum (born 1989), American football player
- Jake Scott (disambiguation), multiple people
- Jake Scrimshaw (born 2000), English footballer
- Jake Seal, British film producer
- Jake Seamer (1913–2006), English cricketer
- Jake Sedgemore (born 1978), English footballer
- Jake Selby (1900–1951), Scottish rugby union footballer
- Jake Seymour (1854–1897), American baseball player
- Jake Shane (born 1999/2000), American influencer
- Jake Shears (born 1978), American singer
- Jake Sheridan (born 1986), English footballer
- Jake Sherman (disambiguation), multiple people
- Jake Shields (born 1979), American mixed martial artist
- Jake Shimabukuro (born 1976), American ukulele player
- Jake Shorrocks (born 1995), English rugby league footballer
- Jake Short (born 1997), American actor
- Jake Siegel (born 1989), American actor
- Jake Siemens (1896–1963), Canadian farmer
- Jake Siewert (born 1964), American political advisor
- Jake Silas (born 1991), Canadian football player
- Jake Silbermann (born 1983), American actor
- Jake Silverberg (born 1996), American cyclist
- Jake Silverstein (born 1975), American writer
- Jake Simmons Jr. (1901–1981), American entrepreneur
- Jake Wallis Simons (born 1978/1979), British journalist
- Jake Simpkin (born 2001), Australian rugby league footballer
- Jake Sinclair (disambiguation), multiple people
- Jake Slaughter (born 2002), American football player
- Jake Smith (disambiguation), multiple people
- Jake Smolinski (born 1989), American baseball player
- Jake Smollett (born 1989), American actor
- Jake Snider (born 1976), American vocalist
- Jake Soliday (born 1978), American football player
- Jake Soligo (born 2003), Australian rules footballer
- Jake Solomon, American game designer
- Jake Something (born 1989), American professional wrestler
- Jake Spavital (born 1985), American football coach
- Jake Spedding (born 1996), English rugby league footballer
- Jake Speight (born 1985), English footballer
- Jake Spencer (disambiguation), multiple people
- Jake Sprague (born 1984), American rugby union footballer
- Jake Stahl (1879–1922), American baseball player
- Jake Stahl (American football) (1891–1966), American football player
- Jake Stein (born 1994), Australian rules footballer
- Jake Steinfeld (born 1958), American actor
- Jake Stenzel (1867–1919), American baseball player
- Jake Stephens (1900–1981), American baseball player
- Jake Stewart (disambiguation), multiple people
- Jake Stone (disambiguation), multiple people
- Jake Stoneburner (born 1989), American football player
- Jake Stormoen (born 1988), American actor
- Jake Strachan (born 1996), Australian rugby union footballer
- Jake Striker (1933–2013), American baseball player
- Jake Stringer (born 1994), Australian rules footballer
- Jake Stuart (born 1991), Cook Islands footballer
- Jake Sullivan (born 1976), American political advisor
- Jack Swagger (born 1982), American professional wrestler
- Jake Sweeting (born 1999), English rugby league footballer
- Jake Swirbul (1898–1960), American aviator
- Jake Szymanski, American actor

=== T ===
- Jake Tabor (born 2003), English footballer
- Jake Tago (born 1999), Australian rugby league footballer
- Jake Tapp (born 1988), Canadian swimmer
- Jake Tapper (born 1969), American journalist
- Jake Taylor (disambiguation), multiple people
- Jake Te Hiwi, New Zealand rugby union footballer
- Jake Teshka, American politician
- Jake Thackray (1938–2002), English singer-songwriter
- Jake Thewlis (born 2005), English rugby league footballer
- Jake Thielman (1879–1928), American baseball player
- Jake Thies (1926–2013), American baseball player
- Jake Thomas (born 1990), American actor and singer
- Jake Thomas (Canadian football) (born 1990), Canadian football player
- Jake Thompson (born 1994), American baseball player
- Jake Thomson (born 1989), English footballer
- Jake Tilson (born 1958), American artist
- Jake Tolbert, American baseball player
- Jake Tonges (born 1999), American football player
- Jake Toolson (born 1996), American basketball player
- Jake Tordesillas (1949–2017), Filipino screenwriter
- Jake Traeger (born 1980), American soccer player
- Jake Trbojevic (born 1994), Australian rugby league player
- Jake Trotter (born 1981), American sports writer
- Jake Tsakalidis (born 1979), Georgian-Greek basketball player
- Jake Tuli (1931–1998), South African boxer
- Jake Turnbull (born 1993), Australian-American rugby union footballer
- Jake Turner (disambiguation), multiple people
- Jake Turpin (born 1996), Australian rugby league footballer
- Jake Turx (born 1986), American journalist

=== U ===
- Jake Udell (born 1989), American entrepreneur
- Jake Upfield (born 1995), Australian rugby union footballer

=== V ===
- Jake Vaadeland (born 2004), Canadian singer-songwriter
- Jake Van Tubbergen (born 1998), American basketball player
- Jake Vargas (born 1992), Filipino actor
- Jake Varner (born 1986), American wrestler
- Jake Vedder (born 1998), American snowboarder
- Jake Verity (born 1997), American football player
- Jake Vincent Villa (born 1989), Filipino politician
- Jake Vincent (born 1989), British water polo player
- Jake Virtanen (born 1996), Canadian ice hockey player
- Jake Virtue (1865–1943), American baseball player
- Jake Vokins (born 2000), English footballer
- Jake Volz (1878–1962), American baseball player
- Jake Voskuhl (born 1977), American basketball player

=== W ===
- Jake Wade (disambiguation), multiple people
- Jake Walker (disambiguation), multiple people
- Jake Walman (born 1996), Canadian ice hockey player
- Jake Walsh (born 1995), American baseball player
- Jake Warden (born 2002), American internet personality
- Jake Wardle (born 1998), English rugby league footballer
- Jake Warga (born 1972), American journalist
- Jake Warren (1921–2008), American diplomat
- Jake Waterman (born 1998), Australian rules footballer
- Jake Waters (born 1992), American football player
- Jake Watson (1973–1999), American cyclist
- Jake Weary (born 1990), American actor
- Jake Weatherald (born 1994), Australian cricketer
- Jake Weber (born 1964), English actor
- Jake Weber (basketball) (1918–1990), American basketball player
- Jake Webster (born 1983), New Zealand rugby league footballer
- Jake Weimer (1873–1928), American baseball player
- Jake Wells (1863–1927), American baseball player
- Jake West (disambiguation), multiple people
- Jake Westbrook (born 1977), American baseball player
- Jake Wetzel (born 1976), Canadian rower
- Jake Wheatley (born 1971), American politician
- Jake White (born 1963), South African rugby coach
- Jake Wholey (born 1993), English footballer
- Jake Wieneke (born 1994), American football player
- Jake Wightman (born 1994), British runner
- Jake Williams (born 1974), British music producer
- Jake Williams (American football) (1905–1967), American football player
- Jake Wilson (born 1977), American politician
- Jake Winebaum (born 1959), American entrepreneur
- Jake Wingfield (born 2001), English rugby league footballer
- Jake Winter (born 1997), Australian cricketer
- Jake Wise (born 2000), American ice hockey player
- Jake Witt (born 2000), American football player
- Jake Wood (disambiguation), multiple people
- Jake Woodford (born 1996), American baseball player
- Jake Woods (born 1981), American baseball player
- Jake Woolmore (born 1990), English rugby union footballer
- Jake Worthington (born 1996), American singer
- Jake Wright (born 1986), English footballer

=== Y ===
- Jake Yapp (born 1973), American comedian
- Jake Adam York (1972–2012), American poet
- Jake Young (disambiguation), multiple people
- Jake Yuzna (born 1982), American film director

=== Z ===
- Jake Zamansky (disambiguation), multiple people
- Jake Zemke (born 1975), American motorcycle racer
- Jake Zim (born 1976), American corporate executive
- Jake Zimmerman (born 1974), American politician
- Jake Zumbach (born 1950), Canadian football player
- Jake Zyrus (born 1992), Filipino singer

== Fictional characters named Jake ==
=== Characters known only as Jake ===
- Jake the Dog, in the American animated fantasy franchise Adventure Time, including the short film (2007), the original series (2010-2018), a limited series (2020-2021), and a spin-off series (2023-present), all voiced by John DiMaggio; appearances in franchise comics, video games, and other media
- Jake, in the animated series Ninjago (2011-2022)
- Jake, in the Finnish video game franchise Angry Birds
- Jake, in the Denmark mobile video game Subway Surfers
- Jake the Polar Bear, in the television series "Jim Henson's Animal Show" (1994 -1996)

=== Characters with full names (Jake + surname or alias) ===
- Jake Chambers, in The Dark Tower series of novels written by Stephen King, and in the 2017 American film adaptation, played by Tom Taylor
- Jake Dean, in the British soap opera Hollyoaks (1995-present), played by Kevin Sacre (2002-2010)
- Jake Green, in the American TV series Jericho (2006–2008), played by Skeet Ulrich
- Jake Hanson, in the American TV soap opera Melrose Place, played by Grant Show
- Jake Hunter, in the video game series of the same name (first released in 1987)
- Jake McKinnon, in the American TV series Another World (1964-1999), played by Tom Eplin
- Jake Moon, in the British TV soap opera EastEnders (1985-present), played by Joel Beckett
- Jake Peralta, in the American TV series Brooklyn Nine-Nine (2013-2021), played by Andy Samberg
- Jake Stevens, a fictional Irish TV personality played by P. J. Gallagher
- Jake Sully, in the American Avatar franchise, including the films Avatar (2009), Avatar: The Way of Water (2022) and Avatar: Fire and Ash (2025) played by Sam Worthington; appearances in franchise comics, video games, and other media

== See also ==
- Jake (disambiguation), a disambiguation page for "Jake"
- Jakes (disambiguation), a disambiguation page for "Jakes"
