= Jacob Miller =

Jacob Miller may refer to:

- Jacob W. Miller (1800–1862), American politician
- Jacob Miller Campbell (1821–1888), American soldier and politician
- Jacob C. Miller (1840-1917), American Soldier and Medal of Honor recipient
- Jacob Henry Miller (1865–1920), American lawyer and politician
- Jacob Miller (musician) (1952–1980), Jamaican reggae artist
- Jacob Miller (fl. 2001–2006), American musician in duo Nemesis
- Jacob Miller (rugby league) (born 1992), Australian rugby league footballer
- Jacob Miller (baseball) (born 2003), American baseball player

== See also ==
- Jacob Miller House, in Petoskey, Michigan
- Jake Miller (disambiguation)
- Jakob Miller (1550–1597), German theologian
