= Kanera =

Kanera may refer to:

- Kanerakhel, an Afghan clan
- Kanera, Berasia, a village in India
- Kanera, Huzur, a village in India
- Kanera, a Pakistani tribe.

== See also ==
- Kaner (disambiguation)
