= Jacob Smith =

Jacob Smith may refer to:

- Jacob Smith (fur trader) (1773–1825), fur trader, American spy, and founder of Flint, Michigan
- Jacob Smith (actor) (born 1990), Laurier University
- Jacob Smith (politician) (1816–1891), ship's captain, Mayor and MHA in South Australia
- Jacob H. Smith (1840–1918), U.S. Army general during the Philippine–American War in 1901, and veteran of the Wounded Knee Massacre
- Jacob W. Smith (1851–1926), businessman and political figure in Saskatchewan, Canada
- Jacob Getlar Smith (1898–1958), painter and muralist
- Jacob Smith (field hockey) (born 1991), played for New Zealand men's national field hockey team
- Jacob Smith (cyclist) (born 2000), British para-cyclist
- Jacob Smith (racing driver), American stock car racing driver

== See also ==
- Jake Smith (disambiguation)
