= Jake Logue =

American football player (born 1972)

Profile
- Position: Quarterback

Personal information
- Born: November 15, 1972 (age 53)
- Listed height: 6 ft 3 in (1.91 m)
- Listed weight: 205 lb (93 kg)

Career information
- High school: Horizon (Thornton, Colorado)
- College: Mesa State (1991–1994)
- NFL draft: 1995: undrafted

Career history
- Las Vegas Sting (1995); Memphis Pharaohs (1996)

Career AFL statistics
- Comp. / Att.: 27 / 63
- Passing yards: 312
- TD–INT: 6–6
- QB rating: 42.66
- Rushing TDs: 1
- Stats at ArenaFan.com

Jason "Jake" Logue (born November 15, 1972) is an American former professional football quarterback who played one season with the Memphis Pharaohs of the Arena Football League (AFL). He played college football at Mesa State College. He was also a member of the Las Vegas Sting of the AFL.

== Early life ==
Jason Logue was born on November 15, 1972. He played high school football at Horizon High School in Thornton, Colorado. He was part of the first class of students to attend Horizon High. Due to this, the football team was composed of only sophomores during Logue's sophomore year. He started his first game at quarterback as a sophomore. He passed for 1,400 yards as a senior, which was the third most in the state that year. Logue earned all-state honors in high school.

== College career ==
Logue was a member of the Mesa State Mavericks of Mesa State College from 1991 to 1994. He did not attempt a pass in 1991. He was a starter for the Mavericks from 1992 to 1994. Logue split time with Sean Pitts in 1993. Logue threw for a school-record 366 yards during a 1993 game. He was also a punter for Mesa State. Logue threw for college career totals of 5,383 yards and 30 touchdowns while also rushing for 694 yards and 15 touchdowns.

== Professional career ==
After going undrafted in the 1995 NFL draft, Logue signed with the Las Vegas Sting of the Arena Football League (AFL). However, he did not play in any games for the Sting that year. The Sting became the Anaheim Piranhas in 1996.

In early April 1996, Logue was traded to the Memphis Pharaohs for future considerations. He was slated to be the team's third-string quarterback for the 1996 season. However, after presumptive starter John Bonds suffered an injury during a preseason game, Logue was promoted to second-string. He took over as quarterback after starter Brad Lebo suffered an injury on the team's first offensive play of the regular season. The Pharaohs ended up losing the game 54–30 to the Charlotte Rage. Logue then started the team's next game of the season against the Connecticut Coyotes, completing 10 of 23 passes for 140 yards, two touchdowns, and three interceptions as the Pharaohs lost 68–34. Grady Benton was then named the starter for the next game, and Logue remained a backup until being waived in early June 1996 after John Bonds returned from injury. Overall, Logue played in five games during the 1996 season, completing 27 of 63 passes (42.9%) for 312 yards, six touchdowns, and six interceptions while also rushing for 22 yards and a touchdown.
