= Kaner =

Kaner may refer to:

== People with the surname ==
- Cem Kaner (fl. from 1988), American professor of software engineering
- Jake Kaner (born 1959), British academic
- Matthew Kaner (born 1986), British composer
- Ömer Kaner (1951–2026), Turkish footballer
- Richard Kaner (fl. from 1984), American chemist
- Walter Kaner (1920–2005), American journalist

== Places ==
- Kaner State, a village and former princely state in Kathiawar, Gujarat, India

== See also ==
- Kanera (disambiguation)
- Danish Kaneria (born 1980), Pakistani cricketer
