= Jake Lloyd (disambiguation) =

Jake Lloyd (born 1989) is an American actor.

Jake Lloyd may also refer to:

- Jake Lloyd (footballer) (born 1993), Australian rules footballer
- Jake Lloyd-Jones, Australian television producer
