= Jake Arnold =

Jake Arnold may refer to:

- Jake Arnold (decathlete) (born 1984), American decathlete
- Jake Arnold (interior designer), British, Los Angeles-based celebrity interior designer
