= John Bonds =

American football player (born 1970)

Profile
- Position: Quarterback

Personal information
- Born: February 6, 1970 (age 56)
- Listed height: 6 ft 4 in (1.93 m)
- Listed weight: 235 lb (107 kg)

Career information
- High school: St. Mary's (Phoenix, Arizona)
- College: Northern Arizona
- NFL draft: 1993: undrafted

Career history
- Phoenix Cardinals (1993)*; Arizona Rattlers (1994); Miami Hooters (1994); Milwaukee Mustangs (1994); Arizona Cardinals (1995)*; Memphis Pharaohs (1995–1996)
- * Offseason or practice squad member only

Career AFL statistics
- Comp. / Att.: 65 / 146
- Passing yards: 725
- TD–INT: 12–13
- Passer rating: 43.32
- Stats at ArenaFan.com

John Bonds (born February 6, 1970) is an American former professional football quarterback who played three seasons in the Arena Football League (AFL) with the Arizona Rattlers, Miami Hooters, Milwaukee Mustangs, and Memphis Pharaohs. He played college football and basketball at Northern Arizona University. He also had two offseason stints with the Phoenix/Arizona Cardinals of the National Football League (NFL).

== Early life ==
John Bonds was born on February 6, 1970. He played high school football and basketball at St. Mary's High School in Phoenix, Arizona. He earned first-team all-state honors in football as a senior in 1987.

== College career ==
Bonds redshirted for the Arizona State Sun Devils of Arizona State University in 1988. On September 1, 1989, he transferred to play for the Northern Arizona Lumberjacks of Northern Arizona University. He had to sit out the 1989 season due to his late transfer. Bonds played for the Lumberjacks from 1990 to 1992. In 1990, he set school single-season records in passing yards with 3,039 and touchdown passes with 24. His 24 touchdown passes also tied an NCAA Division I-AA record. He was suspended for a game in 1991 due to violating team rules. Bonds missed part of the 1992 season due to a torn ligament in his throwing hand. He also played basketball at Northern Arizona, joining the team on January 30, 1992, after leading scorer and rebounder David Wolfe quit the team. Wolfe was the fourth player to quit the Lumberjacks basketball team that season. Bonds played in four games during the 1991–92 basketball season, recording four points, three rebounds, and one assist.

== Professional career ==
Bonds signed with the Phoenix Cardinals on April 27, 1993, after going undrafted in the 1993 NFL draft. On August 24, 1993, it was reported that Bonds had been waived by the Cardinals.

Bonds signed with the Arizona Rattlers of the Arena Football League (AFL) on May 2, 1994. He played in four games for the Rattlers, completing one of three passes for six yards.

In June 1994, Bonds was traded to the Miami Hooters for a player to be named later. He appeared in one game for the Hooters but did not record any statistics. On July 18, 1994, he was waived by Miami.

Bonds was claimed off waivers by the Milwaukee Mustangs on July 20, 1994. He did not play in any games for the Mustangs during the 1994 season.

Bonds signed with the Arizona Cardinals in January 1995. He was waived in late July 1995.

On August 9, 1995, before the AFL playoffs, Bonds signed with the Memphis Pharaohs as a replacement for backup quarterback Gene Johnson, who left the team to return to his college coaching job. Bonds competed with Brad Lebo for the Pharaohs' starting quarterback job in 1996. However, Bonds broke his collarbone during the team's second preseason game and was not activated until June. Bonds then played in eight games during the 1996 season, completing 64 of 143 passes (44.8%) for 719 yards, 12 touchdowns, and 13 interceptions. He was released by the newly-renamed Portland Forest Dragons on February 27, 1997.
