= Jake Matthews =

Jake Matthews may refer to:

- Jake Matthews (fighter) (born 1994), Australian mixed martial artist
- Jake Matthews (American football) (born 1992), American football offensive tackle

== See also ==
- Jake Mathews (born 1971), Canadian country music singer, songwriter and performer
