= Jake Hamilton & the Sound =

American Gospel Band

- Origin: Rancho Cucamonga, California, U.S.
- Genres: CCM, Christian rock, praise & worship
- Labels: Fuel Music
- Members: Jake Hamilton, Brian Campbell, Marc Ford, Dustin Lau, Seth Thomas
- Website: jakehamiltonmusic.com

Jake Hamilton & the Sound is a Christian praise & worship band from Rancho Cucamonga, California started in 2013. In 2014, the band released their debut studio album with Fuel Music entitled Beautiful Rider that has seen commercial successes and positive criticism.

== Music ==
The band is on the Fuel Music label, and released their first studio album on January 21, 2014 entitled, Beautiful Rider, which saw commercial successes and positive criticism.

=== Studio work ===
The band released their first studio album Beautiful Rider on January 21, 2013, and it saw success on the Billboard Christian Albums and Heatseekers Albums charts at Nos. 27 and 13 respectively.

== Members ==
- Jake Hamilton (Guitar & vocals)
- Brian Campbell (Bass)
- Marc Ford (Guitar)
- Dustin Lau (Keysboard)
- Seth Thomas (Drum)

== Discography ==
=== Studio albums ===
List of studio albums, with selected chart positions
Title	Album details	Peak chart positions	
Title	Album details	US CHR	US HEAT
Beautiful Rider	Released: January 21, 2014; Label: Facedown Records; CD, digital download	27	13
