= Tertiary Education Commission (New Zealand) =

New Zealand high education oversight agency

Agency overview
- Formed: 13 February 2003
- Jurisdiction: New Zealand
- Employees: 400
- Ministers responsible: Hon Erica Stanford, Minister of Education; Hon Penny Simmonds, Minister for Vocational Education
- Agency executives: Tim Fowler, Chief executive; Jenn Bestwick, Chairperson
- Website: www.tec.govt.nz

The Tertiary Education Commission (TEC; Māori: Te Amorangi Mātauranga Matua) is a New Zealand Crown entity which oversees the tertiary education sector in New Zealand including universities, polytechnics and vocational apprenticeship programmes. It was established in 2003.

== Mandates and functions ==
The Tertiary Education Commission has oversight over tertiary education providers including universities, polytechnics and vocational institutions. They implement the Government's tertiary education policies and are governed by the Education Act 1989.

The Ministry of Business, Innovation and Employment (MBIE) also has monitoring oversight over the TEC.

== Leadership and structure ==
The TEC is governed by a Board of Commissioners and led by an executive team. As of 2025, its chief executive was Tim Fowler while its chairperson was Jenn Bestwick.

TEC consists of five directorates: the Information Directorate, Corporate and Finance Directorate, Deliveries Directorate, the Careers and Investment Design Directorate, and the Ōritetanga Learner Success Directorate. The Ōritetanga Learner Success Directorate focuses on the Māori and Pasifika communities, and addressing economic and social deprivation.

The TEC comes under the portfolios of the Minister of Education Erica Stanford and the Minister for Vocational Education Penny Simmonds.

== History ==
=== Fifth Labour Government, 2003–2008 ===
The Tertiary Education was launched on 13 February 2003 as part of the Fifth Labour Government's new Tertiary Education Strategy. The TEC was launched as a Crown entity that was tasked with working with tertiary education providers to implement the Government's tertiary education policies and goals.

In April 2004 the Minister in charge of the TEC, Steve Maharey, appointed deputy chairperson Kaye Turner as Acting Chairperson and board member Shona Butterfield as Acting Deputy Chair following the departure of Chairperson Andrew West and board member Ian Smith, who left to assume new positions at AgResearch and the Australian Nuclear Science and Technology Organisation.

In December 2007, Tertiary Education Minister Pete Hodgson appointed Robin Hapi as a new commissioner in the TEC's board.

=== Fifth National Government, 2008–2017 ===
On 1 July 2017, the TEC assumed the staff and functions of Careers New Zealand.

=== Sixth Labour Government, 2017–2023 ===
In December 2019, Education Minister Chris Hipkins appointed Māori education specialist Dr Wayne Ngata and Business NZ head Kirk Hope to TEC's board. Dr Alastair MacCormick's appointment was also extended for another term.

=== Sixth National Government, 2023–present ===
Between May and April 2024, the TEC cut 28 jobs as part of a wave of public sector job cuts initiated by the Sixth National Government to reduce government spending by 6 percent (roughly NZ$25 million) over the next four years. The Public Service Association criticised the TEC's job cuts for disproportionately affecting female employees.

On 12 March 2025, Vocational Education Minister Penny Simmonds and Minister of Universities Shane Reti appointed Robin Hapi CNZM and Sharon McGuire as TEC board members until 31 October 2027. In late May 2025, Alan Bollard CNZM and Hapi were appointed as Chair and Deputy Chair of the TEC's board.

In early June 2025, the TEC confirmed it would remove extra funding for Māori and Pasifika enrolments in vocational courses and reduce funding for workplace training; which amounted to eight percent of its budget. The TEC will continue funding for disabled students and those with low prior educational achievement.
