= Jake Miller =

Jake Miller may refer to:

- Jake Miller (pitcher) (1898–1975), pitcher in Major League Baseball
- Jake Miller (pitcher, born 2001), baseball pitcher
- Jake Miller (outfielder) (1895–1974), outfielder in Major League Baseball
- Jake Miller (singer) (born 1992), American hip hop artist
- Jake Miller, a minor character in Marvel Comics

== See also ==
- Jacob Miller (disambiguation)
- Jake Millar
- Jake Milner
- Jake Muller
