= Jacob Bailey =

Jacob Bailey is the name of:

- Jacob Bailey (author) (1731–1808), Church of England clergyman and author
- Jacob Whitman Bailey (1811–1857), American naturalist
- Jacob Bailey Moore (1797–1853), American journalist and historical writer

== See also ==
- Jake Bailey (disambiguation)
