= Chris Pirillo =

American businessman and television personality

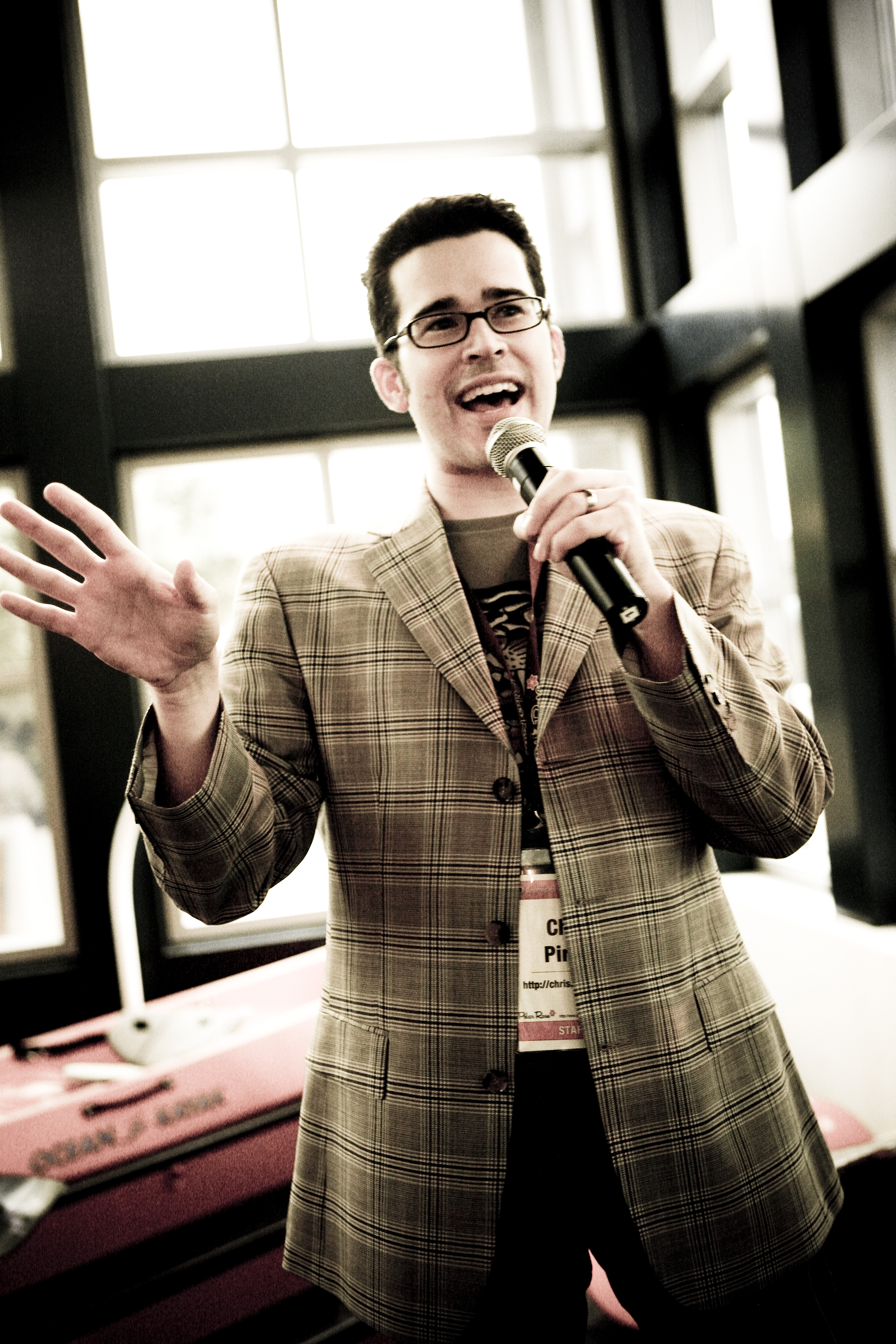
- Pirillo speaking at Gnomedex in 2007
- Years active: 2000–present
- Website: chris.pirillo.com

Chris Pirillo is an American entrepreneur and former television personality. He is the founder and former CEO of LockerGnome, Inc., a network of technology-focused blogs, web forums, mailing lists, and online communities that operated from 1996 to 2015. Pirillo was also a host of Call for Help, a call-in tech support show which aired on TechTV from 2001 to 2003. From 2001 to 2011, he hosted Gnomedex, a single-track technology conference.

== Career ==
LockerGnome began as a technology mailing list in 1996, offering advice for operating systems and applications, software suggestions (with an emphasis on public domain and shareware software), and website recommendations. Over time, the site expanded to incorporate content syndicated from LockerGnome's blogs for IT professionals. The associated web forum for technology assistance and discussion operated from 2002 to 2015.

Pirillo was the co-host of the show Call For Help on the former cable television channel TechTV from 2001 to 2003.

Pirillo has authored several books, including Poor Richard's E-mail Publishing, Online! The Book, the latter co-authored with John C. Dvorak and Wendy Taylor.

== Gnomedex ==
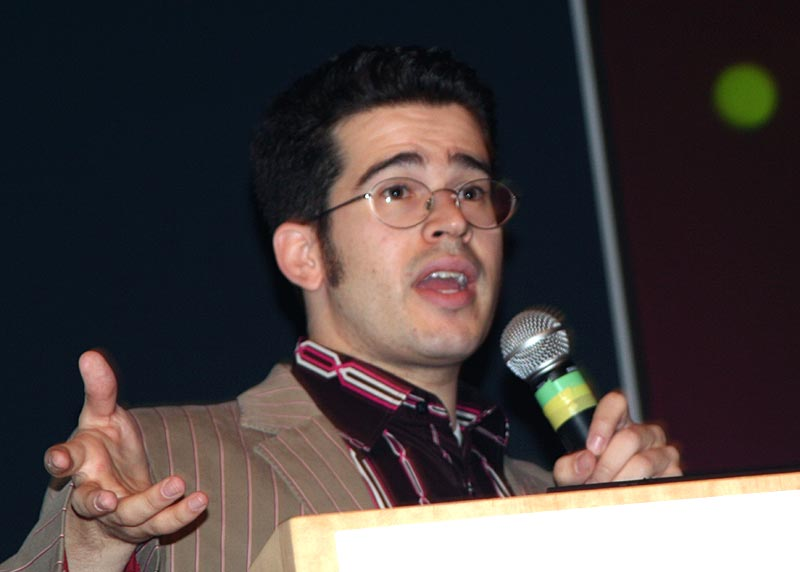
Chris Pirillo at Gnomedex 2005

Starting from 2001, Pirillo and his staff at Lockergnome organized Gnomedex, a single-track technology conference which began as an outgrowth of Pirillo's technology channels. Gnomedex explored new and emerging technologies with a primary audience of influencers, entrepreneurs and tech enthusiasts. The conference name is a portmanteau of Lockergnome and the now-defunct Comdex technology trade show, a major technology event at that time.

The first Gnomedex took place from 12–14 October 2001 in Des Moines, Iowa. From 2005 until the tenth and final Gnomedex in August 2010, it took place in Seattle, Washington. A Gnomedex stage was included in the first Seattle Interactive Conference in November 2011, after Jake Ludington reportedly convinced Chris Pirillo to continue the event.

In March 2015, Chris Pirillo announced plans to revive Gnomedex sometime in 2015, but this did not materialize.
