= Jake Needham =

Jake Needham may refer to:

- Jake Needham (cricketer) (born 1986), English cricketer
- Jake Needham (novelist), American novelist
