= Jake Ludington =

American writer

- Born: Jacob Byron Ludington; August 29, 1973 (age 53); Des Moines, Iowa, U.S.
- Education: Iowa State University
- Occupation: Author
- Spouse: Robin Amrine (m. 2004)

Jacob Byron Ludington (born August 29, 1973) is the American author of Easy Digital Home Movies and founder of tech help site MediaBlab.

== Biography ==
Ludington was born in Des Moines, Iowa. He majored in Marketing at the Iowa State University. He married Robin Amrine on June 6, 2004. Jake currently lives in Bainbridge Island, Washington.

== Projects ==
Jake Ludington publishes how-to articles for his Jake Ludington's Digital Lifestyle publication, with over 2,000 articles and 29,000 readers as of July 1, 2009.

Jake Ludington co-produced a video with Brandon Wirtz demonstrating how to play Xbox 360 games while in a moving car which was featured on MTV Obsessed

Jake Ludington was co-organizer of the first 3 Gnomedex events and past business partner of Chris Pirillo. Ludington has contributed articles to Popular Science, PC Today, and O'Reilly.

== Bibliography ==
- Easy Digital Home Movies (2004), Que Publishing ISBN 978-0-7897-3114-2
