= Jake Zamansky =

Jake Zamansky may refer to:

- Jake Zamansky (lawyer), securities arbitration attorney based in New York, NY
- Jake Zamansky (skier) (born 1981), American alpine ski racer
