= Jake Walker =

Jake Walker may refer to:

- Jake Walker (curler) (born 1989), Canadian curler
- Jake Austin Walker (born 1997), American singer and actor
- Jake Walker (English footballer) (born 2000), English football defender/midfielder
- Jake Walker (Irish footballer) (born 2000), Irish football striker
- Jake Walker (racing driver) (born 2006), American racing driver
- Jake Walker (Family Affairs), a fictional character from the British TV soap opera Family Affairs
