= Jake Bailey =

Jake Bailey may refer to:

- Jake Bailey (make-up artist) (1978–2015), American make-up artist and photographer
- Jake Bailey (American football) (born 1997), American football punter

== See also ==
- Jacob Bailey (disambiguation)
