= Jake Newton =

Jake Newton may refer to:

- Jake Newton (footballer) (born 1984), Guyanese international footballer
- Jake Newton (ice hockey) (born 1988), American ice hockey player
