= Jake Reinhart =

American photographer

Jake Reinhart is an American photographer from Pittsburgh, Pennsylvania.

== Life and work ==
Reinhart has worked extensively in his native Pittsburgh. The resulting images have been featured online in Slate and exhibited at the Colorado Photographic Arts Center, and Silver Eye Center for Photography.

Reinhart joined the board of Silver Eye Center for Photography in 2015.

== Awards ==
- Flight School Fellowship – September, 2017
- Pittsburgh Filmmakers Emerging Photographers Grant
- Greater Pittsburgh Arts Counsel Artist Opportunity Grant

== Publications ==
- Where the Land Gives Way. Los Angeles: Deadbeat Club, 2017.
- Unquiet Grave. Self Published, 2016
- Wasteland. Self Published, 2015

== Collections ==
- London College of Communication Special Collection
- PNC Bank, NA. Corporate Art Collection
- RISD Fleet Library Special Collection
- International Center for Photography
- Philadelphia Photo Arts Center
- Center for Documentary Studies at Duke University
