= Jake Resnicow =

Jake Resnicow is an American promoter and event producer.

== Professional career ==
Resnicow started as a nightlife editor for Edge Magazine and later became the first to launch Matinée in the U.S. with events at Governors Island, Universal Studios Orlando, Cowabunga Bay WaterPark, and Winter Party.

He is the founder of Dreamland and Planet Pride. He produced the first-ever Pride event in Central Park.

Resnicow was a promoter in the Governors Island event in 2010. He collaborated on Europe's largest HIV/AIDS charity event Life Ball, and arranged WorldPride celebrations. He produced several events for the LGBTQ+ community, and for Utopia, he pledged to donate $50 from each pass sold to provide grants for LGBTQ+ artists and nightlife workers in need.

Resnicow has redefined entertainment for the LGBTQ+ community, creating safe spaces and collaborating with esteemed artists like Purple Disco Machine, Kygo, Adam Lambert, Jess Glynn, Kim Petras and VINCINT.

=== Achievements ===
His record-breaking world pride event at Javits Center raised over $500,000 for charity.

== Early life and education ==
Resnicow was born in Hollywood, Florida, and grew up in Newton outside Boston, Massachusetts. He studied B.A. at Georgetown school in Washington, DC.
