= Jake Galea =

Maltese footballer

Personal information
- Full name: Jake Galea
- Date of birth: 15 April 1996 (age 30)
- Place of birth: Malta
- Height: 1.80 m (5 ft 11 in)
- Position: Goalkeeper

Team information
- Current team: Valletta
- Number: 16

Senior career*
Years	Team	Apps	(Gls)
2015–2017	St. Andrews	47	(0)
2017–2018	Ħamrun Spartans	13	(0)
2018–2021	Sliema Wanderers	54	(0)
2021–2022	Balzan	14	(0)
2022–2023	Etzella Ettelbruck	20	(0)
2023–	Valletta	14	(0)

International career^{‡}
2018	Malta U20	1	(0)
2017–2018	Malta U21	8	(0)
2020–	Malta	5	(0)
- * Club domestic league appearances and goals as of 11 March 2024 ‡ National team caps and goals as of 16 April 2023

Jake Galea (born 15 April 1996) is a Maltese footballer who plays as a goalkeeper for Valletta and the Malta national team.

== Career ==
Galea made his international debut for Malta on 7 October 2020 in a friendly match against Gibraltar.

In 2022, he signed for Luxembourgish side Etzella Ettelbruck, becoming the first Maltese player in Luxembourg.

== Career statistics ==
=== International ===
As of 1 June 2022

Malta
Year	Apps	Goals
2020	2	0
2021	1	0
2022	1	0
Total	4	0
