= Jake Millar =

New Zealand entrepreneur (1995–2021)

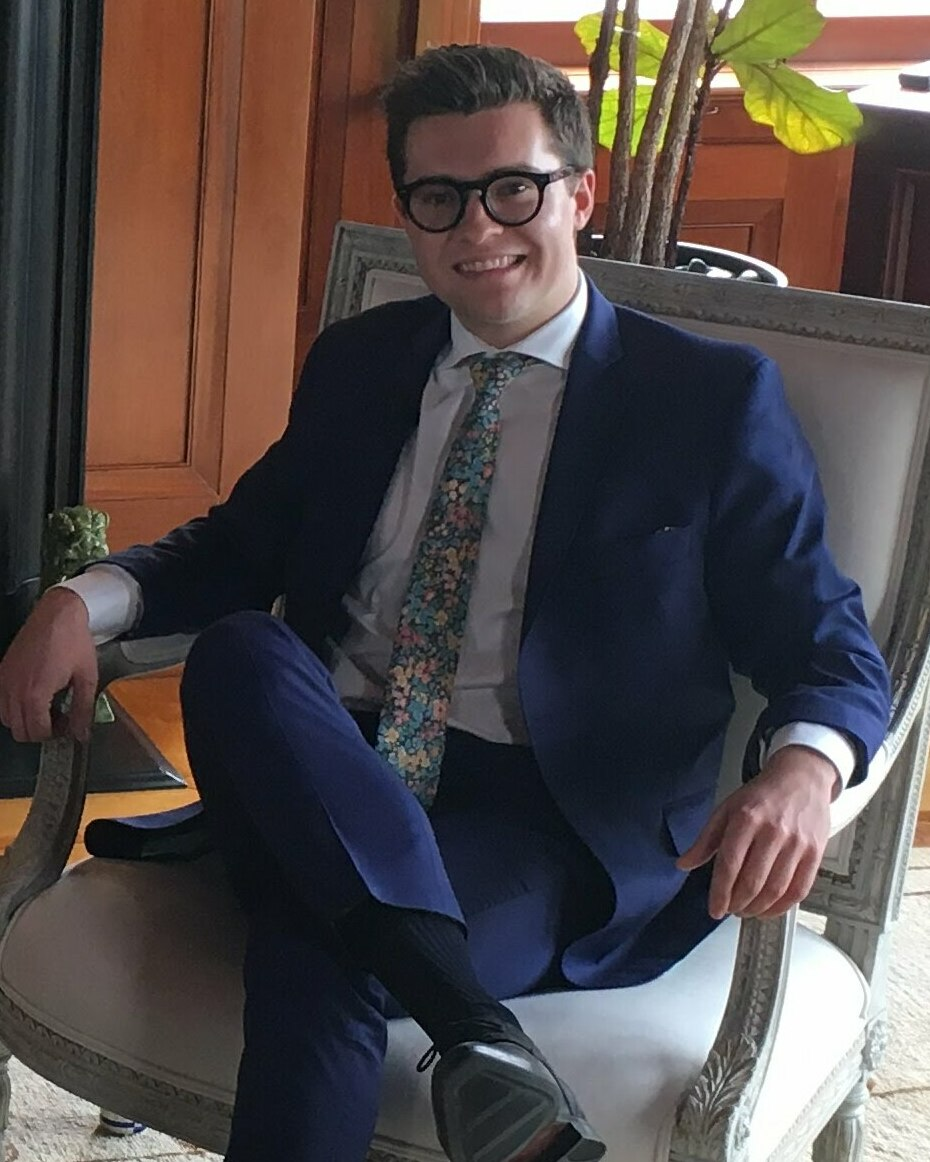
- Millar in 2018
- Born: Jake Christopher Clifford Miller; 8 August 1995; Christchurch, New Zealand
- Died: 29 November 2021 (aged 26); Karen, Kenya
- Cause of death: Suicide
- Education: Christchurch Boys' High School
- Occupation: Entrepreneur
- Years active: 2013–2021
- Known for: Founder of Oompher and Unfiltered
- Father: Rod Miller

Jake Christopher Clifford Millar (né Miller; 8 August 1995 – 29 November 2021) was a New Zealand entrepreneur and businessman who founded the companies Oompher and Unfiltered. On 29 November 2021, at age 26, Millar died by suicide in Karen, Kenya.

== Early life ==
Millar was born in Christchurch, New Zealand and was the son of Robyn Jacobs and the late Rod Miller. He was raised in Greymouth. Rod Miller died in the 2010 Fox Glacier FU-24 crash.

Millar was ambitious about business from a very young age. During his primary school years Millar's Mother Robyn helped him create and sell fridge magnets outside of supermarkets.

Also with the influence of his fathers Sky Diving Business growing up, Millar saw that business was something he wanted to get into as he got older.

Early in his career, Millar made a notable change to his personal identity. Originally born Jake Miller, he decided to change his surname to ‘Millar’ at the age of 19, when he was just starting his first business. This change was motivated by a desire to avoid confusion with the American rapper of the same name, as this was impacting the visibility of his business and its achievements online.

Millar expressed a wish that he had chosen a more distinctive change, reflecting on the decision, “All the stuff we were posting about the business and the publicity we were getting at the time was just getting lost. I spent months trying to work out what to change it to and I wish I changed it to something more fun instead of just changing a letter.”

== Career ==
Millar's professional business career started early during his teenage years when he was attending Christchurch Boys' High School, where he was Head Boy in 2013. There he founded his first company with a school friend, Oompher, in 2014, a career advice platform.

Still a teenager, he sold Oompher to the New Zealand Government, with the platform being taken up by Careers New Zealand only 10 months after beginning Oompher.

== Unfiltered ==
Millar's next venture was Unfiltered which he founded in 2015, a platform that provides inspirational interviews and advice from high-profile individuals. A notable interview Millar did for Unfiltered was with British business magnate Richard Branson.

Despite the promise of the idea with nearly $5 million raised and a $12+ million valuation at its peak, the business failed as a result of the impact of COVID-19 and Unfiltered was subsequently sold in early 2021 to Crimson Education for a combination of cash and shares.

== Personal life and death ==
Following the sale of his business, pressure from investors and New Zealand media led Millar to leave the country for Kenya. He had previously lived in Auckland and New York City.

On 29 November 2021, at age 26, Millar died by suicide in Karen, Kenya.
