= Jake Lindsey =

Jake Lindsey may refer to:

- Jake W. Lindsey (1921–1988), United States Army soldier and Medal of Honor recipient
- Jake Lindsey (fighter) (born 1986), American mixed martial artist
