= Jake Hirst =

Jake Hirst may refer to:

- Jake Hirst (baseball), American baseball coach
- Jake Hirst (footballer) (born 1996), English-German footballer
