= Jake Lawlor =

Jake Lawlor may refer to:

- Jake Lawlor (American football), (1907–1980), American football player and coach of American football, basketball, and baseball
- Jake Lawlor (English footballer), (born 1991), English association football player
