= Jake Gannon =

American ice hockey player (born 1987)

- Born: January 25, 1987 (age 39) Roselle, Illinois, U.S.
- Height: 6 ft 1 in (185 cm)
- Weight: 192 lb (87 kg; 13 st 10 lb)
- Position: Defense
- Shot: Right
- Played for: Bridgeport Sound Tigers; Peoria Rivermen
- NHL draft: Undrafted
- Playing career: 2009–2012

Jake Gannon (born January 25, 1987) is a former professional ice hockey defenseman who played three years in the St. Louis Blues and New York Islanders systems.

Prior to turning professional, Gannon was a two-time captain and four-time academic all conference recipient at Colorado College in the Western Collegiate Hockey Association.

== Career statistics ==
			Regular season					Playoffs
Season	Team	League	GP	G	A	Pts	PIM	GP	G	A	Pts	PIM
2004–05	Sioux City Musketeers	USHL	14	1	2	3	6	11	0	1	1	8
2005–06	Colorado College	WCHA	26	0	2	2	24	—	—	—	—	—
2006–07	Colorado College	WCHA	37	1	1	2	64	—	—	—	—	—
2007–08	Colorado College	WCHA	41	0	5	5	24	—	—	—	—	—
2008–09	Colorado College	WCHA	31	0	3	3	4	—	—	—	—	—
2009–10	Utah Grizzlies	ECHL	38	2	4	6	44	2	0	2	2	0
2009–10	Bridgeport Sound Tigers	AHL	26	2	2	4	8	—	—	—	—	—
2010–11	Utah Grizzlies	ECHL	16	1	7	8	20	—	—	—	—	—
2010–11	Peoria Rivermen	AHL	45	2	6	8	6	4	0	0	0	2
2011–12	Peoria Rivermen	AHL	12	0	1	1	6	—	—	—	—	—
AHL totals			83	4	9	13	20	4	0	0	0	2
