= Jake Smith =

Jake Smith may refer to:

- Jake Smith (American football) (born 2001), American football player
- Jake Smith (catcher) (born 1983), minor league baseball player
- Jake Smith (pitcher, born 1887) (1887–1948), American baseball pitcher
- Jake Smith (third baseman), American baseball player
- Jake Smith (pitcher, born 1990), American baseball pitcher
- Jake Smith (runner) (born 1998), British long-distance runner
- Jake Smith (born 1974/1975), American country singer from Los Angeles, known as The White Buffalo

== See also ==
- Jacob Smith (disambiguation)
