= Jake Hooker =

Jake Hooker may refer to:

- Jake Hooker (musician) (1952–2014), Israeli-born musician
- Jake Hooker (journalist) (born 1973), American journalist
