= Jake Putnam =

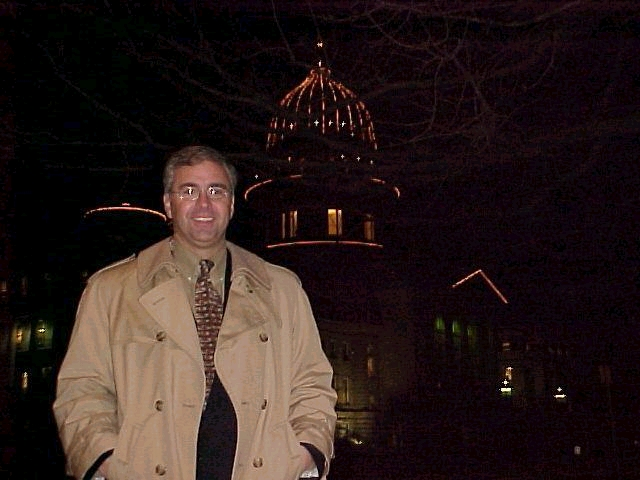
Jake Putnam reports from the Idaho Statehouse, January 1999

Jake Putnam is a former Emmy-winning journalist who currently works in public relations in Boise, Idaho.

== Early life and education ==
Putnam was born in Pocatello, Idaho on November 22, 1956, and is a graduate of Pocatello High School and Idaho State University. Putnam began his career in 1984 as a photographer for KIFI television in Idaho Falls. In 1985, he started as a general assignment reporter in the Pocatello Bureau.

In 1987, KTVB of Boise Idaho hired Putnam as a general assignment and political reporter in Boise. In 1995, Putnam won an Emmy and in his 16-year career, won awards from the Associated Press, United Press International, Idaho Press Club, and the Society of Professional Journalists. In 1997, Putnam was nominated for another Emmy and named Moderator of the public affairs program, Viewpoint. Viewpoint finished number in the ratings in all three years under Putnam's reign.

Putnam played Division I college tennis at Idaho State and worked for tennis legend Frank X. Brennan as head pro at Mercersburg Academy. Thirty years later, he's still playing with a year-end national ranking of 19 in 2014, 22 in 2015, and 26 in doubles in the USTA's Men's 55 Division. In June 2012, Putnam reached a personal best ranking of 395th in World ITF rankings. That year he played in the World Championships going four rounds, which consisted of winning two qualifying matches before losing the second round. In 2015 Putnam was named to the United States Osuna Cup team and has played on nine consecutive teams. Overall Putnam has played on four Osuna Cup Championship teams, In 2021 he was named Co-Captain of the USA team and won his first Team Cup championship and still serves as co-captain of the USA team.

As a senior olympian, In the 2012 US Senior games, Putnam finished 4th in Houston losing in the semi-finals. Overall Putnam has won 12 Gold Medals in the Idaho Senior Games Since 2007 bringing his tennis career record to 22 medals over the past 14 years.

Putnam retired from the Idaho Farm Bureau Federation but still is a freelance writer, USA Osuna Cup Captain, and film producer.

Source: Ada County Historic Preservation Council, Boise, Idaho

- https://web.archive.org/web/20110718202118/http://www.adaweb.net/Portals/0/HPC/images/JakePutnamBio.jpg
