= Jake Kelly =

Jake Kelly may refer to:

- Jake Kelly (footballer, born 1990), footballer in the League of Ireland
- Jake Kelly (Australian footballer) (born 1995), Australian rules football player
- Jake Kelly (cyclist) (born 1995), British and Isle of Man road and track cyclist
