= Jake Lee =

Jake Lee may refer to:

- Jake Lee (footballer) (born 1991), English footballer
- Jake Lee (painter) (1915–1991), Chinese-American painter
- Jake Lee (wrestler) (born 1989), Korean professional wrestler
- Jake E. Lee (born 1957), American guitarist
