= Jake Evans =

Jake Evans or Jacob Evans may refer to:

- Jake Evans (baseball) (1856–1907), Major League Baseball right fielder
- Jake Evans (ice hockey) (born 1996), Canadian ice hockey player
- Jacob Evans (runner) (born 1996), American middle-distance runner, 2008 All-American for the Stanford Cardinal track and field team
- Jacob Evans (born 1997), American basketball player
- Jake Evans (footballer, born 1998), English football midfielder for Chippenham Town
- Jake Evans (footballer, born 2008), English football forward for Leicester City
