= Jake Hamilton =

American singer

- Born: Charles Jacob Hottie Hamilton; April 15, 1979 (age 47); Rancho Cucamonga, California, U.S.
- Genres: CCM, Christian rock, praise and worship
- Occupations: Singer, songwriter
- Instruments: Vocals, acoustic guitar
- Years active: 2009–present
- Labels: Jesus Culture, Kingsway
- Website: jakehamiltonmusic.com

Charles Jacob "Jake" Hamilton (born April 15, 1979) is an American Christian praise and worship singer and songwriter. Hamilton released the album entitled Marked By Heaven in 2009, which was his first full-length live album. This was followed by his second live album 2011's Freedom Calling, which saw commercial successes via the Billboard charts. In 2014, Hamilton started a band called Jake Hamilton & the Sound, and they released Beautiful Rider.

== Background ==
Hamilton was born Charles Jacob Hamilton on April 15, 1979, in Rancho Cucamonga, California, to mother Catherine and father Charles. Hamilton has two younger brothers.

== Career ==
Hamilton started as a recording artist in 2009 with his first live album Marked By Heaven on the Jesus Culture Music and Kingsway labels. His second live project was Freedom Calling in 2011 released by Jesus Culture Music and Kingsway, and this received commercial successes. In 2014, Hamilton started a band called Jake Hamilton & the Sound releasing their first album entitled Beautiful Rider that has received commercial successes and positive criticism.

== Discography ==
=== Studio albums ===
List of studio albums, with selected chart positions
Title	Album details	Peak chart positions	
Title	Album details	US CHR	US HEAT
Marked By Heaven	Released: May 11, 2009; Label: Jesus Culture/Kingsway; CD, digital download	–	–
Freedom Calling	Released: May 17, 2011; Label: Jesus Culture/Kingsway; CD, digital download	18	9
Beautiful Rider	Released: January 21, 2014; Label: Tone Tree; CD, digital download	–	–
Holy Ghost - single from the film Holy Ghost	Released: June 17, 2014; Label: Rylan Records; digital download	–	–
