= Jake Arnold (interior designer) =

British interior designer

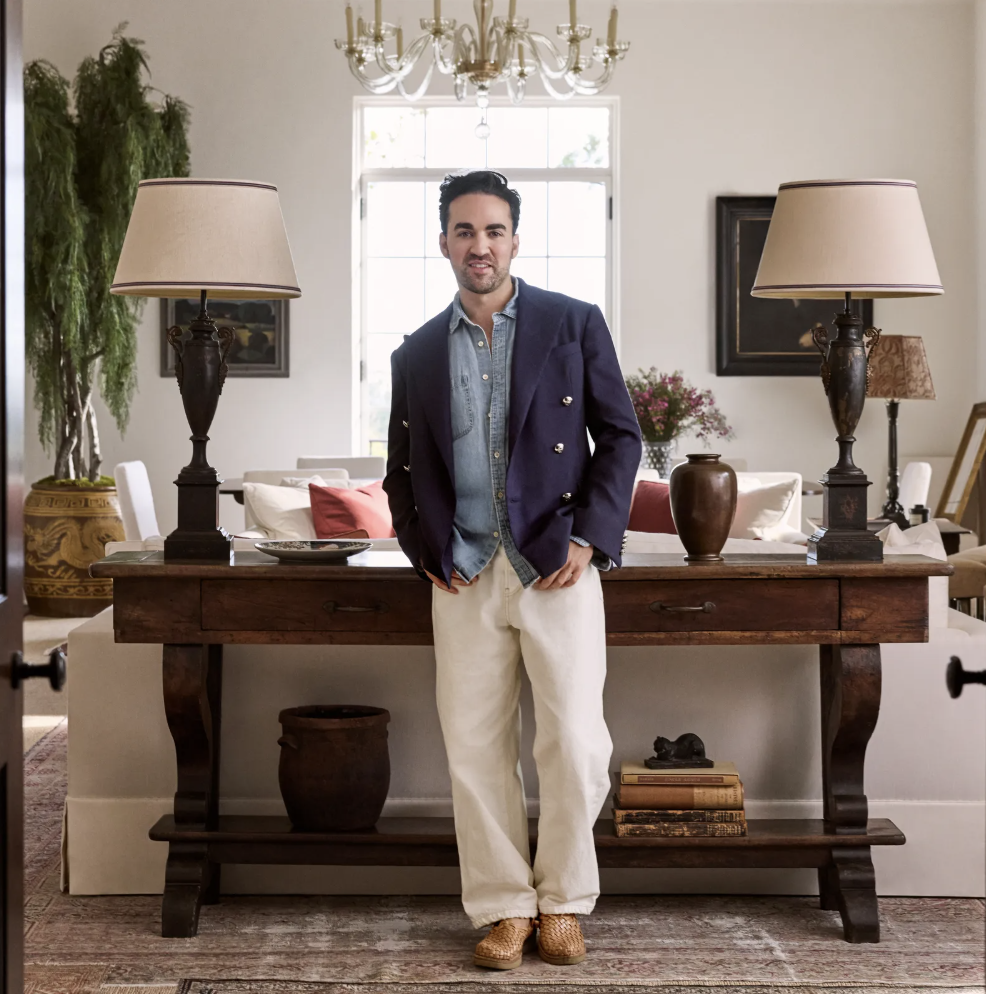
- Arnold in 2026 (photo by Justin Coit)
- Born: London, England
- Occupation: Interior designer
- Years active: 2012–present
- Known for: Co-founder of The Expert

Jake Arnold is an AD100 British interior designer based in Los Angeles, known for his work with celebrity clients and as the co-founder of the digital design platform The Expert.

== Career ==
Arnold began his design career after moving from London to Los Angeles in 2012. He gained early recognition for his work on actress Julianne Hough's home, which was featured on the January 2017 cover of Better Homes & Gardens (magazine).

In 2020, he established his own design firm, Studio Jake Arnold, and co-founded The Expert, a platform connecting clients with interior designers for virtual consultations.

In August 2023, the Beverly Hills home designed by Arnold for John Legend and Chrissy Teigen appeared on Architectural Digest’s first global cover collaboration across its international editions.

Arnold's clientele includes celebrities such as John Legend and Chrissy Teigen, Katy Perry, Aaron Paul, Rashida Jones, Whitney Cummings, and Zendaya.

== Recognition ==
Arnold has been named to Architectural Digest's AD100 list of top designers for five consecutive years: 2022-2026.

== Product Collaborations ==
In addition to his design work, Arnold has launched product lines in collaboration with major brands:

- In 2022, he introduced a bedding collection with Parachute Home.
- In 2023, he partnered with Crate & Barrel to release a 50-piece furniture and decor collection inspired by 1940s French modernism.
- In 2025, he expanded his collaboration with Crate & Barrel to include outdoor and children's collections.
- In 2025, Arnold released his third rug and wallpaper collection for Lulu & Georgia.
- In 2026, Arnold released his first drapery collection with Everhem.

== Publications ==
In September 2023, Arnold released his first book, Redefining Comfort, published by Rizzoli. The book showcases nine of his design projects, offering insights into his approach to creating spaces that blend elegance with comfort.

== Design Philosophy ==
Arnold is known for creating spaces that blend timeless sophistication with lived-in comfort, often incorporating rich textures, warm color palettes, and bespoke detailing.
