= Careers New Zealand =

Agency overview
- Dissolved: 1 July 2017
- Superseding agency: Tertiary Education Commission
- Jurisdiction: New Zealand
- Minister responsible: Erica Stanford, Minister of Education
- Agency executives: Dr Graeme Benny, Chief Executive; Mr Arthur Graves, Chairperson
- Website: www.careers.govt.nz

Careers New Zealand (previously Career Services) was a New Zealand Crown agent which offered advice and support to help New Zealanders make decisions about their career.

The support was offered through face-to-face counselling, group counselling sessions, telephone support, web chat, and self-help assistance and information via a website.

On 1 July 2017, the staff and functions of Careers New Zealand were transferred to the Tertiary Education Commission.
