= Jake Maltby =

English footballer

Personal information
- Full name: Jake Peter Maltby
- Date of birth: 24 May 2000 (age 26)
- Position: Midfielder

Team information
- Current team: Silsden

Youth career
- Bradford City

Senior career*
Years	Team	Apps	(Gls)
2017–2019	Bradford City	0	(0)
2019	Farsley Celtic	6	(0)
2020–2024	Silsden		
2024	Hyde United	0	(0)
2024–	Silsden	0	(0)
- * Club domestic league appearances and goals

Jake Maltby (born 24 May 2000) is an English footballer who plays as a midfielder for Silsden.

== Career ==
He made his senior debut on 7 November 2017, in a Football League Trophy game.

He joined Farsley Celtic in summer 2019.

He joined Silsden on a dual registration in October 2020.

After a productive season at Silsden, scoring 10 goals in 48 games from midfield, he joined Hyde United ahead of the 2024–25 season. He re-joined Silsden in November 2024.

== Career statistics ==
As of 19 November 2020

Appearances and goals by club, season and competition
Club	Season	League			FA Cup		League Cup		Other		Total	
Club	Season	Division	Apps	Goals	Apps	Goals	Apps	Goals	Apps	Goals	Apps	Goals
Bradford City	2017–18	League One	0	0	0	0	0	0	1 (Note: Appearance in the EFL Trophy.)	0	1	0
Bradford City	2018–19	League One	0	0	0	0	0	0	0	0	0	0
Bradford City	Total		0	0	0	0	0	0	1	0	1	0
Farsley Celtic	2019–20	National League North	6	0	0	0	0	0	0	0	6	0
Farsley Celtic	2020–21	National League North	0	0	0	0	0	0	0	0	0	0
Farsley Celtic	Total		6	0	0	0	0	0	0	0	6	0
Career total			6	0	0	0	0	0	1	0	7	0
