= Jake Kerr =

Jake Kerr may refer to:

- Jake Kerr (businessman) (born 1944), Canadian executive
- Jake Kerr (rugby union) (born 1996), Scottish rugby union player
