= Jake Foley =

English cricketer (born 1994)

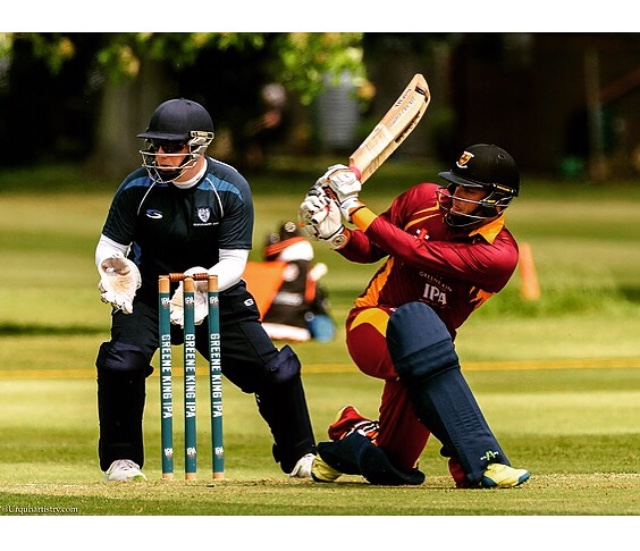
- Foley batting for Suffolk in 2018

Personal information
- Full name: Jake Matthew Foley
- Born: 21 September 1994 (age 32); Colchester, Essex, England
- Height: 6 ft 2 in (1.88 m)
- Batting: Left-handed
- Bowling: Leg break

Domestic team information
- Years: Team
- 2014: Hampshire
- 2018–2019: Suffolk

Career statistics
Competition	List A
Matches	1
Runs scored	0
Batting average	–
100s/50s	–/–
Top score	–
Balls bowled	0
Wickets	–
Bowling average	–
5 wickets in innings	–
10 wickets in match	–
Best bowling	–
Catches/stumpings	–/–
- Source: Cricinfo, 12 August 2015

Jake Matthew Foley (born 21 September 1994) is an English former cricketer.

Foley was born in Colchester in September 1994. He was educated at Felsted School, before matriculating to Southampton Solent University. Prior to his matriculation, he played club cricket in Essex for Colchester and East Essex, for whom he took 31 wickets for in 2013 with his leg break bowling. Upon moving to university, he joined South Wilts in the Southern Premier Cricket League. He played for Hampshire in 2014, making a single appearance in List A one-day match against Sri Lanka A at the Rose Bowl. The match was abandoned after 18 overs, with Foley not being called on to bowl in the Sri Lankan A innings.

Having won the Southern Premier Cricket League with South Wilts, he later returned to play club cricket for Colchester and East Essex, with Foley being appointed club captain in 2017. Foley played minor counties cricket for Suffolk in 2018 and 2019, making three appearances in the Minor Counties Championship, four in the MCCA Knockout Trophy, and sixteen in the Minor Counties T20.

== External list ==
Jake Foley at Cricinfo
