= Jacob Getlar Smith =

American painter (1898–1958)

- Born: 1898; New York City, New York, U.S.
- Died: October 28, 1958 (aged 59–60); The Bronx, New York, U.S.
- Occupations: Painter, muralist

Jacob Getlar Smith (1898 – October 28, 1958) was an American painter and muralist who worked mostly in New York City. Smith studied at the National Academy of Design in New York from 1919 to 1921.

In 1929, Smith was awarded a Guggenheim Fellowship in the field of fine arts, for creative work in painting.

Smith's paintings have been exhibited in several galleries, including the Midtown Galleries, New York; the National Academy of Design; the Art Institute of Chicago; the Corcoran Gallery of Art; the Pennsylvania Academy of Fine Arts; the John Herron Art Institute; the Fort Wayne Art Museum; the Carnegie Institute; the Brooklyn Museum; the Minneapolis Institute of Arts; the Ann Arbor Art Association; the Rochester Memorial Art Gallery; the Cincinnati Museum; the Art Gallery of Toronto; the National Gallery of Canada (Ottawa); the Des Moines Association of Fine Arts; the Kansas City Art Institute; the City Art Museum of St. Louis; and the Nebraska Art Association.

In 1930, Smith was awarded the Mr. and Mrs. Frank G. Logan Prize of 750 dollars for his painting Friends, by the Committee on Painting and Sculpture of the Art Institute of Chicago.

He died at Montefiore Hospital in The Bronx, New York, on October 28, 1958.

== Works ==
Paintings by Smith:

- The Artist's Wife (1927), an oil painting in the collection of the Brooklyn Museum
- Snow Shovelers (1934), an oil painting in the collection of the Smithsonian American Art Museum
- Murals commissioned by the U.S. Treasury Section of Painting and Sculpture for the New Deal, in the Federal Building and Post Office, Salisbury, Maryland: Salisbury, Stage at Byrd's Inn and Cotton Patch
- Murals in the Nyack, New York Post Office, 1936, commissioned by the Treasury Relief Art Project

Smith was the author or editor of books and articles on painting, including:

- Editor for Jan Gordon's A step-ladder to painting (New York: Greenberg, c1939)
- Watercolor painting for the beginner (New York: Watson-Guptill, 1951)
- The watercolors of Maurice Prendergast (New York: Watson-Guptill, 1956, published in American artist, volume 20, number 2, February 1956)
