= Jake Taylor =

Jake Taylor may refer to:

== People ==
- Jake Taylor (footballer, born 1991), Welsh footballer
- Jake Taylor (footballer, born 1998), English footballer
- Jake Taylor (ice hockey) (born 1983), American ice hockey defenseman
- Jake Taylor, lead singer of the Australian band In Hearts Wake
- Jake Taylor (politician), American politician

== Fictional ==
- Jake Taylor, portrayed by Tom Berenger in films Major League and Major League II
- Jake Taylor, portrayed by Joshua Jackson in the film Cursed
- Jake Taylor, portrayed by Randy Wayne in the film To Save a Life
- Jake Taylor, a fictional character of Nan's Christmas Carol
- Jake Taylor, portrayed by Charley Grapewin in the film Atlantic City
- Jake Taylor, portrayed by Jordan Fisher in the film Work It
- Jake Taylor, portrayed by Adam Demos in the film Falling Inn Love
