= Jake Cooper =

Jake Cooper may refer to:

- Jake Cooper (socialist) (1916–1990), American socialist
- Jake Cooper (footballer, born 1995), English footballer (Reading, Millwall)
- Jake Cooper (footballer, born 2001), English footballer (Rotherham, Gateshead, Hartlepool, Darlington)
