= Jake Ball =

Jake Ball may refer to:

- Jake Ball (cricketer) (born 1991), English cricketer
- Jake Ball (rugby union) (born 1991), Welsh rugby union player
