= Kanera, Huzur =

Kanera
- village
- Location within Madhya Pradesh Location within India
- Coordinates: 23.422503°N 77.450134°E
- Country: India
- State: Madhya Pradesh
- District: Bhopal
- Tehsil: Huzur

Population (2011)
  - Total: 440
- Time zone: UTC+5:30 (IST)
- ISO 3166 code: MP-IN
- Census code: 482399

Kanera is a village in the Bhopal district of Madhya Pradesh, India. It is located in the Huzur tehsil.

== Demographics ==
According to the 2011 census of India, Kanera has 104 households. The effective literacy rate (i.e. the literacy rate of population excluding children aged 6 and below) is 70.74%.

Demographics (2011 Census)
	Total	Male	Female
Population	440	230	210
Children aged below 6 years	64	31	33
Scheduled caste	163	80	83
Scheduled tribe	4	2	2
Literates	266	166	100
Workers (all)	242	142	100
Main workers (total)	83	75	8
Main workers: Cultivators	64	61	3
Main workers: Agricultural labourers	5	5	0
Main workers: Household industry workers	1	1	0
Main workers: Other	13	8	5
Marginal workers (total)	159	67	92
Marginal workers: Cultivators	39	9	30
Marginal workers: Agricultural labourers	119	58	61
Marginal workers: Household industry workers	0	0	0
Marginal workers: Others	1	0	1
Non-workers	198	88	110
