= Jake Forbes =

Jake Forbes may refer to:

- Jake Forbes (ice hockey) (1897–1985), Canadian ice hockey player
- Jake T. Forbes (born 1977), American editor
