= Jake Stewart =

Jake Stewart may refer to:

- Jake Stewart (politician)
- Jake Stewart (cyclist)
