= Jacob Miller House =

Historic house in Michigan, United States

- U.S. National Register of Historic Places
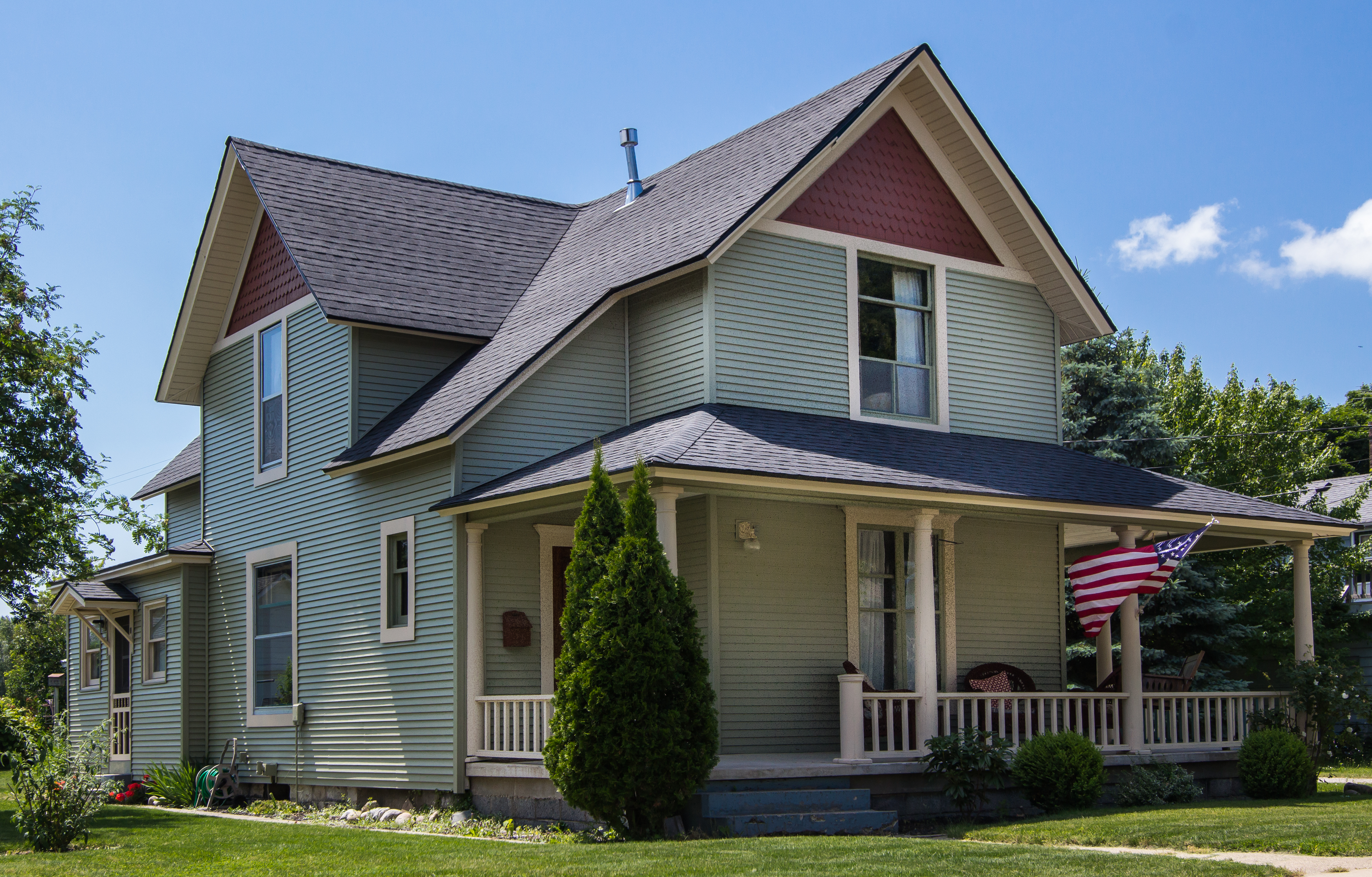

- Location within Michigan Location within the United States
- Interactive map
- Location: 307 Jackson St., Petoskey, Michigan
- Coordinates: 45°22′16″N 84°57′51″W
- Area: 0.3 acres (0.12 ha)
- Built: 1903
- Architectural style: Queen Anne
- MPS: Petoskey MRA
- NRHP reference No.: 86002031
- Added to NRHP: September 10, 1986

The Jacob Miller House is a private house located at 307 Jackson Street in Petoskey, Michigan. It was placed on the National Register of Historic Places in 1986.

The Jacob Miller House is a two-story, cross-gabled frame Queen Anne structure with a single story addition in the rear. The front facade has a hip-roof, wrap-around porch supported by Doric columns. The house is sheathed with clapboard, with the gables covered with ornamental fish-scale shingles.

The Jacob Miller House was constructed in 1903, and is a well-preserved characteristic example of the Queen Anne style house constructed in Petoskey. It is associated with the carpenter Jacob Miller, who lived in the house for many years.
