= Jake Sheridan =

English footballer

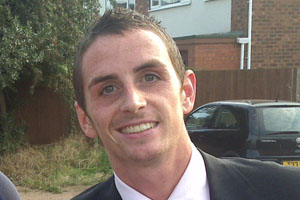
- Sheridan in 2009

Personal information
- Full name: Jake Sheridan
- Date of birth: 8 July 1986 (age 40)
- Place of birth: Nottingham, England
- Height: 5 ft 8 in (1.73 m)
- Position: Midfielder

Senior career*
Years	Team	Apps	(Gls)
?–2005	Dunkirk		
2005–2007	Notts County	30	(1)
2007–2011	Tamworth		
2011–2012	Eastwood Town		
2011–2012	→ Lincoln City (loan)	20	(0)
2012–2014	Lincoln City	70	(1)
2014–2015	Alfteton Town	9	(0)
2015	→ Boston United (loan)		
2015–2017	Basford United		
- * Club domestic league appearances and goals as of 01:44 16 September 2014 (UTC)

Jake Sheridan (born 8 July 1986) is an English football coach and former footballer.

As a player he was a midfielder who notably played professionally for Notts County and Lincoln City. He also played in Non-League football for Dunkirk, Tamworth, Eastwood Town, Alfreton Town, Boston United and Basford United.

== Playing career ==
=== Notts County ===
Born in Nottingham, Nottinghamshire, Sheridan joined Notts County from Dunkirk on 5 August 2005. Sheridan, under the guidance of manager Gary Mills, made his debut for Notts County on 6 August 2005 in a scoreless away fixture against Torquay United. Just six days later he and teammate Stacy Long were offered one-year deals by County. During the 2005–06 season, Sheridan established himself as a regular in the team making 27 appearances and scored his only goal for the club in a 1–1 draw away to Wrexham. Sheridan agreed a new one-year deal at Meadow Lane on 22 May 2006.

The following season proved a little more difficult for Sheridan, with the midfielder only making a total of three league appearances, and finding himself on the wrong side of the retained list for the 2007–08 season.

=== Tamworth ===
On 2 July 2007, Sheridan teamed up with his former Notts County manager Gary Mills at Conference North side Tamworth, agreeing a one-year contract. In his first season with Tamworth, the club recorded a disappointing 15th-place finish in the Conference North, with Sheridan making 12 appearances and failing to find the net.

Sheridan signed a new one-year contract to remain at Tamworth for the 2008–09 season. Sheridan made 11 appearances and scored his first goal for the club in a home fixture against Southport, as Tamworth finished the season as league champions.

Following promotion to the Conference National, Sherdian was one of five players who agreed a new deal with The Lambs. He proved to be important member of the squad, and this showed as Sheridan made 23 appearances and had a very good season in front of goal, scoring five goals including a memorable winner in the 2–1 win at home to Wrexham on 25 August 2009.

After a successful season, Sheridan expressed interest in returning for 2010–11 season. He was granted his wish and was handed a further one-year extension. Sheridan again found himself a regular in the team, and went on to make 35 league appearances, and despite scoring only one goal all season, scored what proved to be the winner on the final day of the 2010–11 in a home fixture against Forest Green Rovers.

On 16 June 2011, Sheridan's hopes of another year with Tamworth were dashed, as new manager Marcus Law told him he was not part of his long-term plans for the club, bringing an end to his four-year stay with the club. Sheridan left the club along with Aaron Farrell, a few weeks prior to his contract expiring, in a bid to start looking for a new club for the 2011–12 season.

=== Eastwood Town ===
On 21 July 2011, Sheridan appeared in a pre-season friendly for Conference North side Eastwood Town in their 1–0 defeat against Wrexham.

=== Lincoln City ===
He was loaned out to Conference National side Lincoln City on 17 November 2011 until 1 January 2012, and made his debut nine days later, starting the game against Ebbsfleet United, a match Lincoln went on to win 3–0. He later signed a permanent deal with Lincoln.

=== Later career ===
After a successful campaign with the imps, Sheridan joined Alfreton Town on a one-year contract, following no new contract offer from Lincoln.

In 2015, Sheridan signed for Basford United. On 27 October 2016 he suffered a badly broken leg in a tie against Stamford.

== Coaching career ==
Following his retirement, Sheridan was active on the coaching staff at both Basford United and Eastwood Town before being appointed assistant manager of Gainsborough Trinity on 22 April 2021.

== Honours ==
Tamworth

- Conference North: 2008–09
