= Jake Knapp (disambiguation) =

Jake Knapp may refer to:

- Jake Knapp (born 1994), American professional golfer
- Jake Knapp (baseball) (born 2000), American baseball player
