= Jake Long (disambiguation) =

Jake Long (born 1985) is a former American football player.

Jake Long may also refer to:

- Jake Long (Australian footballer) (born 1996), Australian rules footballer
- American Dragon: Jake Long, American animated TV series
