= Jake Wade =

Jake Wade may refer to:

- Jake Wade (baseball) (1912–2006), MLB pitcher
- Jake Wade, main character in The Law and Jake Wade, a 1958 western by John Sturges

== See also ==
- Jake Wade and the Soul Searchers, a funk band
