= Jacob Wood =

Jacob Wood could refer to:

- Jake Wood (bodybuilding), American businessman and enthusiast of female bodybuilding
- Jake Wood (baseball) (born 1937), American baseball player
- Jake Wood (veteran), U.S. Marine Corps veteran and co-founder of Team Rubicon

== See also ==
- Jake Wood (born 1972), English actor
- Jake Woods (born 1981), American baseball player
