= Jake Dan-Azumi =

Nigerian Professor

- Born: Taraba, Nigeria
- Education: University of Bradford; University College London; University of Oxford; University of South Africa; University of Zimbabwe
- Occupations: Professor, politician, public policy expert
- Organization: Nigerian National Assembly
- Known for: Chief of Staff to the Speaker of the House of Representatives of Nigeria

Jake Dabang Dan-Azumi is a Nigerian professor of political science, politician and public policy expert. He is a professor of Political Science and Development Studies and currently serves as Chief of Staff to the Speaker of the House of Representatives of Nigeria, Rt. Hon. Abbas Tajudeen, a position he assumed in October 2023.

== Early life and family background ==
Jake Dabang Dan-Azumi was born into a Nigerian family with roots in Taraba State and the former North-Eastern Region of Nigeria. Educated by Christian missionaries, he attended Teachers College, Bazza, in present-day Adamawa State, and worked as a teacher at Monkin Primary School before joining the federal civil service.

== Education ==
Dan-Azumi began his formal education at Army Children School, Mubi, in present-day Adamawa State. He attended St. Peter's Seminary, Yola, for his secondary education.

Dan-Azumi earned a Bachelor of Arts (Honours) degree in philosophy from the University of Zimbabwe, graduating with First-Class honours. He received the Book Prize for Best Graduating Student and the Ray Brown Prize for Humanities and Literature at Arrupe College, Harare. He also obtained a Bachelor of Arts degree in Politics, with a specialisation in African Studies, from the University of South Africa (UNISA), graduating with First-Class honours.

He completed a Postgraduate Certificate (with Merit) in Research Methods for the Social Sciences at the University of Bradford in the United Kingdom in 2008. He earned a Doctor of Philosophy in Development Studies (Planning and Administration) from University College London (UCL), where his doctoral research focused on agricultural sustainability and development planning in Nigeria. He later obtained a Master of Science degree in International Human Rights Law from the University of Oxford.

== Career ==
Dan-Azumi began his professional life in education and humanitarian work. Between 2003 and 2004, he worked as a relief worker with the Jesuit Refugee Service at Luwisha House in Lusaka, Zambia, where he coordinated educational and humanitarian support for refugees, including persons with disabilities and orphans, and served as a counsellor for the youth HIV/AIDS prevention team.

== Parliamentary and legislative career ==
=== Office of the Senate President (2011–2013) ===
Dan-Azumi's career in parliamentary governance began in 2011, when he was appointed Special Assistant to Senator David Mark, the then-President of the Senate of the Federal Republic of Nigeria and the longest-serving Senate President in Nigerian history. In that role he conducted legislative research, drafted speeches and policy briefs, coordinated stakeholder engagements, and supported the Office of the Senate President on matters of strategic governance. He developed the first work plan and the terms of reference for staff and special assistants in the Office of the Senate President.

=== National Institute for Legislative and Democratic Studies (2013–2023) ===
In 2013, Dan-Azumi joined the National Institute for Legislative Studies — later renamed the National Institute for Legislative and Democratic Studies (NILDS) — as a Senior Research Fellow. He was named Best Research Fellow at the Institute in 2014. Between 2015 and 2017 he served as Senior Project Officer on a US$1 million Democratic Governance for Development (DGD) / United Nations Development Programme (UNDP) and NILS project on strengthening key processes and committees of the National Assembly. He subsequently managed the UNDP/NILS Nigerian Parliamentary Support Project (2017–2021) as Project Officer.

From 2019 to 2023 he served as deputy director, Democracy and Governance, and Technical Assistant to the Director-General of NILDS, Professor Ladi Hamalai.

=== Chief of Staff to the Speaker (2023–present) ===
In October 2023, Speaker of the House of Representatives Rt. Hon. Abbas Tajudeen appointed Dan-Azumi as his Chief of Staff. In that capacity he coordinates the strategic operations of the Office of the Speaker, oversees policy implementation, manages stakeholder engagement, and provides strategic advisory support on parliamentary and governance matters. His responsibilities include coordination between the Speaker's Office, legislators, development partners, government agencies, civil society organisations and diplomatic stakeholders.

== Academic career ==
Alongside his legislative and governance work, Dan-Azumi has maintained an active academic career involving teaching, postgraduate supervision, curriculum development and institutional collaboration.

=== Selected publications ===
- Poguntke, T. and Hofmeister, W. (eds.), Political Parties and the Crisis of Democracy: Organization, Resilience, and Reform (Oxford University Press, 2024) — contributed the chapter "Political Parties in Nigeria's Fourth Republic, 1999–2019.
- Obadan, M., Dan-Azumi, J. and Egwu, S. (eds.), Treatise on Legislative Capacity Development for Good Governance in Nigeria: A Festschrift for Professor Ladi Hamalai (NILDS / Yaliam Press, 2019).
- Dan-Azumi, J. and Gbahabo, T. (eds.), 16 Years of Law Making in the National Assembly: An Analysis of Bills Processed 2011–2015 (NILS / Petras Digital, 2016).
- Dan-Azumi, J. (ed.), Induction Manual for New Legislators (NILS / Rose Media, 2014).

=== Selected journal articles ===
- "Women and Legislative Representation in Nigeria's National Assembly: A Detailed Appraisal of the 8th Assembly (2015–2019)" (with C. Asan), Journal of Public Administration and Governance, 11(2), 2021.
- "The Challenge of Re-Federalising Nigeria — Revisiting Recent Debates on Political Re-Structuring" (with A. Jega and S. Egwu), Journal of Political Sciences and Public Affairs, 7(1), 2019.
- "Socio-Economic Development and Insecurity in Nigeria: A Study of Boko Haram," Developing Country Studies, 8(6), 2018.
- "Key Legislations in Nigeria, 1999–2015: Potentials for Impact and Challenges," Nigerian Journal of Legislative Affairs, 7(2), 2017.
- "African Smallholders and Agricultural Hybridization," International Journal of Agriculture and Forestry, 6(2), 2016.
- "Agricultural Sustainability of Fadama Farming Systems in Northern Nigeria," International Journal of Agricultural Sustainability, 8(4), 2010

== Honours and awards ==
- Book Prize for Best Graduating Student, University of Zimbabwe / Arrupe College (2005)
- Ray Brown Prize for Humanities and Literature, Arrupe College, Harare (2005)
- Best Research Fellow, National Institute for Legislative Studies (2014)
