= Jake Hutson =

English cricketer (born 1994)

Personal information
- Full name: Jacob William Hutson
- Born: 22 June 1994 (age 32); Sidcup, Kent, England
- Batting: Right-handed
- Role: Wicket-keeper

Domestic team information
- Years: Team
- 2017: Sussex
- Only First-class: 14 June 2017 Sussex v South Africa A

Career statistics
Competition	First-class
Matches	1
Runs scored	25
Batting average	25.00
100s/50s	0/0
Top score	25
Catches/stumpings	2/0
- Source: Cricinfo, 17 June 2017

Jacob William Hutson (born 22 June 1994) is an English cricketer. He made his first-class debut for Sussex against South Africa A on 14 June 2017.
