= Jake Eccleston =

English rugby league footballer

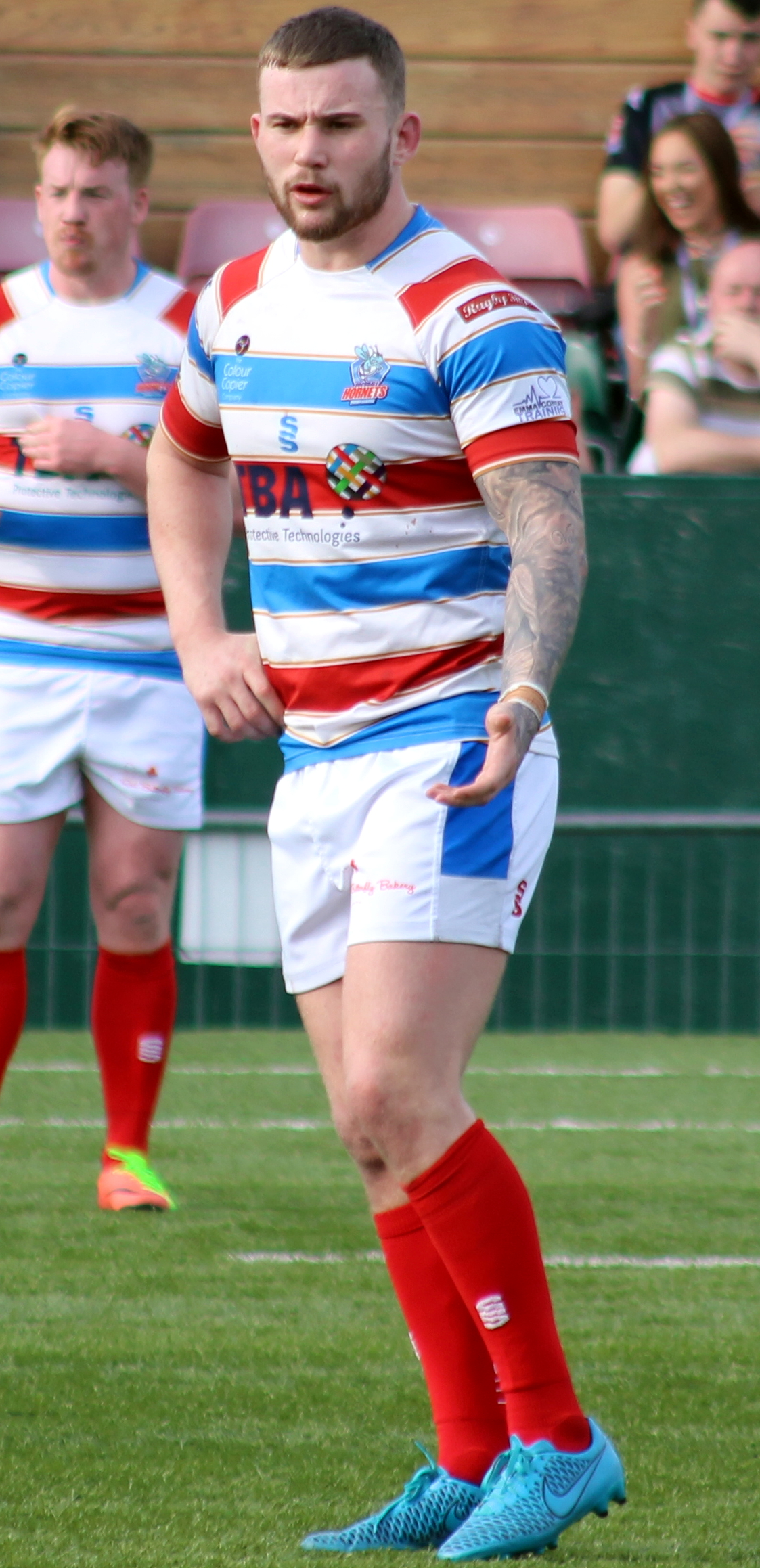

Personal information
- Full name: Jacob Eccleston
- Born: 24 April 1995 (age 30) England

Playing information
- Position: Centre, Wing, Fullback
Club
Years	Team	Pld	T	G	FG	P
2015–16	Halifax	14	6	0	0	24
2017	Rochdale Hornets	24	8	0	0	32
	Total	38	14	0	0	56
- Source: As of 17 December 2017

Jake Eccleston (born 24 April 1995) is an English professional rugby league footballer who last played for the Rochdale Hornets in the Kingstone Press Championship. He plays as a wing, centre or fullback.

Eccleston made his professional début for Halifax in 2015 and spent two years there before departing for Rochdale Hornets at the end of the 2016 season.
