= Jake Carter =

Jake Carter may refer to:

- Jake Carter (basketball) (born 1924–2012), retired American basketball player
- Jake Carter (wrestler) (born 1986), American professional wrestler
- Jake Carter (singer) (born 1998), Irish singer
- Jake Carter, one of the main protagonists from The Marine franchise
