= Jake Brown =

Jake Brown may refer to:

- Jake Brown (skateboarder) (born 1974), Australian skateboarder
- Jake Brown (cricketer) (born 1985), Australian cricketer
- Jake Brown (baseball, born 1948) (1948–1981), Major League Baseball player
- Jake Brown (baseball, born 2005)
- Jake Brown (biathlete) (born 1992), American biathlete
- Jake Brown (footballer) (born c. 1996), English footballer and television personality
