= Jake Allen (disambiguation) =

Jake Allen (born 1990) is a Canadian professional ice hockey goaltender.

Jake Allen may also refer to:

- Jake Allen (gridiron football) (born 1985), American football wide receiver
- Jake Allen (speedway rider) (born 1995), Australian speedway rider
- Jake Allen, co-writer of Brownsville (with Neil Kleid)
- Jake Allen, fictional character in Final Crisis: Revelations
