= Jake Turner =

Jake Turner is the name of:

- Jake Turner (footballer), English footballer
- Jake Turner (musician), American musician
