= Jake Stone =

Jake Stone is the name of:

- Jake Stone (singer), member of Bluejuice
- Jake Stone, State Farm employee
- Jake Stone (EastEnders), fictional character
