= Jake Richards =

Jake Richards may refer to:

- Jake Richards (footballer) (born 2007), English footballer
- Jake Richards (politician) (born 1989), British Labour Party politician
