= Jake Lloyd-Jones =

Australian television producer

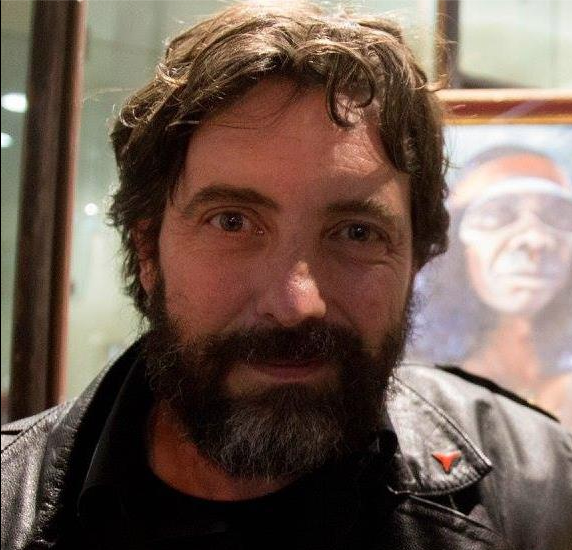
- Born: Perth, Australia
- Occupations: Director; Producer
- Known for: The Chaser's War on Everything; An Occupied Country; Unrequited Art; Which Way is China; Sydney Body Art Ride

Jake Lloyd Jones is an Australian television producer. He is best known for his documentary films on contemporary issues such as Which Way is China on the Chinese underground music scene, or An Occupied Country about Coal Seam Gas Mining in Australia. He was also responsible for conceiving and staging Sydney's notorious community-driven annual art event the Sydney Body Art Ride which raised substantial funds for the Children's Cancer Institute

Jake Lloyd Jones is married and has two daughters, the architect Ania Lloyd Jones and the photo journalist Katia Lloyd Jones. He resides on the Hawkesbury River North of Sydney. His family are descendants of Matthew Everingham, Henry Kable and several other First Fleet convicts who established the first farming communities on the river.

== Filmography ==
=== Television ===
- The Chaser's War on Everything: Series 1, 2 & 3 – Senior Researcher / Producer (2006–2009)
- The New Inventors: Producer (2010–2011)
- Catalyst: Researcher (2010)
- The 7.30 Report: Archival Producer (1995–2005)

=== Documentary ===
- Drinking Tea in a War Zone 2023 - A study of the politics of the Kurdish revolution
- Lost Negatives 2022 - Featured in The Guardian newspaper
- Chaktomuk - Four stories from Phnom Penh 2018 produced in collaboration with the Women’s Network for Unity
- Powderfinger: The Final Odyssey with Myf Warhurst 2010
- Unrequited Art 2011
- THE WIKILEAKS TAPES
- The Elizabeth Street Gallery Project (1&2) 2012, 2014
- Himalayan Sisters: Reflexions sur un voyage 2013
- The Beowulf Project 2014
- An Occupied Country 2015
- Just Let it Happen 2015
- Which Way is China 2016

=== Short film ===
- Under the sun (2014)
- Faces in the Street (2011) A modern interpretation of the famous Henry Lawson poem

=== Photography ===
- Exhibitions at City of Sydney's Pine St Gallery and the Marrickville StirrUp Gallery
- Photograph of Pling purchased for inclusion and promotion of the National Portrait Gallery (Australia) 2020 Pub Rock exhibition
- Hurry up and Wait - Photos from Kurdistan which raised funds for the Kurdish Red Crescent in the aftermath of the 2023 Turkey–Syria earthquakes

=== Television Awards ===
The Chaser's War on Everything (ABC)

- AFI Award 2006 – Best Television Comedy – Winner (Producers: Mark FitzGerald, Julian Morrow, Andy Nehl)
- AFI Award 2007 – Best Television Comedy – Nomination (Producers: Andy Nehl, Julian Morrow, Jo Wathen)
- Logie Award 2008 – Most Outstanding Comedy Program – Nomination
