= Jake Ryan =

Jake Ryan may refer to:

- Jake Ryan (Australian actor) (born 1983), Australian actor
- Jake Ryan (American football) (born 1992), former American football linebacker
- Jake Ryan (American actor) (born 2003), American actor
- Jake Edward Ryan, Citizens for Constitutional Freedom militant in the occupation of the Malheur National Wildlife Refuge
- Jake Ryan, former drummer in the American metalcore band The Chariot
- Jake Ryan (Hannah Montana), a character in Hannah Montana media, played by Cody Linley
- Jake Ryan (Sixteen Candles), a character in the film Sixteen Candles, played by Michael Schoeffling
