= Jake Goodman =

Jake Goodman may refer to:

- Jake Goodman (baseball) (1853–1890), Major League Baseball player
- Jake Goodman (footballer) (born 1993), English footballer
