= Jake Burns (disambiguation) =

Jake Burns (born 1958) is a Northern Irish rock musician.

Jake Burns may also refer to:

- Jake Burns (rugby league) (born 2000), English rugby league footballer
- Jake Burns (rugby union) (born 1941), New Zealand rugby union footballer
