= Jake Edwards =

Jake Edwards may refer to:

- Jake Edwards (Australian footballer) (born 1988), Australian rules footballer
- Jake Edwards (footballer, born 1976), English professional footballer
- Jake Edwards (radio personality), Canada-based radio personality
