= Kanera, Berasia =

Kanera
- village
- Location within Madhya Pradesh Location within India
- Coordinates: 23.729270°N 77.329850°E
- Country: India
- State: Madhya Pradesh
- District: Bhopal
- Tehsil: Berasia

Population (2011)
  - Total: 289
- Time zone: UTC+5:30 (IST)
- ISO 3166 code: IN-MP
- Census code: 482118

Kanera is a village in the Bhopal district of Madhya Pradesh, India. It is located in the Berasia tehsil.The village is about 27 km from the center of Berasia and around 60–65 km from Bhopal, the capital of the region.

Most people in Kanera depend on farming and agricultural work as their main source of income.

== Demographics ==
According to the 2011 census of India, Kanera has 54 households. The effective literacy rate (i.e. the literacy rate of population excluding children aged 6 and below) is 46.78%.

Demographics (2011 Census)
	Total	Male	Female
Population	289	152	137
Children aged below 6 years	56	32	24
Scheduled caste	44	24	20
Scheduled tribe	38	20	18
Literates	109	64	45
Workers (all)	154	80	74
Main workers (total)	96	49	47
Main workers: Cultivators	14	14	0
Main workers: Agricultural labourers	82	35	47
Main workers: Household industry workers	0	0	0
Main workers: Other	0	0	0
Marginal workers (total)	58	31	27
Marginal workers: Cultivators	5	5	0
Marginal workers: Agricultural labourers	52	25	27
Marginal workers: Household industry workers	0	0	0
Marginal workers: Others	1	1	0
Non-workers	135	72	63
