= Jake Reed =

Jake Reed may refer to:

- Jake Reed (American football) (born 1967), American football player
- Jake Reed (baseball) (born 1992), American baseball player
- Jake Reed (cricketer) (born 1990), Australian cricketer
- Jake Reed (footballer) (born 1991), English footballer
