= Jake Sherman =

Jacob Sherman or Jake Sherman could refer to:

- Jake Sherman (journalist) (born 1985), American political writer
- Jake Sherman (pianist), American jazz musician
