= Jake Stuart =

Cook Islands footballer

Personal information
- Full name: Jake Stuart
- Date of birth: 20 November 1991 (age 34)
- Place of birth: Cook Islands
- Height: 1.84 m (6 ft 0 in)
- Position: Defender

Team information
- Current team: Tupapa Maraerenga F.C.

Senior career*
Years	Team	Apps	(Gls)
2014–2015	West Ryde Rovers		
2016	Hobart Zebras	11	(0)
2017–2018	Clarence United	22	(2)
2019	Glenorchy Knights	10	(0)
2020	Taroona FC	13	(9)
2020	Tupapa Maraerenga F.C.		

International career^{‡}
2015–	Cook Islands	3	(0)
- * Club domestic league appearances and goals as of 21 October 2020 ‡ National team caps and goals as of 10 September 2015

Jake Stuart is a Cook Islands footballer, who currently plays for Clarence United FC, in the PS4 National Premier Leagues - Tasmania.

== Career ==
The defender started for West Ryde Rovers, back in 2014 and joined in the spring 2016 to Hobart Jeep Zebras. He played in 19 games for the Zebras and scored 15 goals, before signed in 2017 for Clarence United FC.

== International ==
He made his debut for the national team on 31 August 2015 in a 3–0 win against Tonga and is since this time, the Captain. Stuart played in 3 games for the Cook Islands national football team.
