= Jacob Hoffman =

Jacob Hoffman or Jake Hoffman may refer to:

- Jacob Hoffman (rabbi) (died 1956), German rabbi
- Jake Hoffman (actor) (born 1981), American actor
- Jake Hoffman (American football) (1895–1977), NFL player
- Jacob Hoffman (musician) (died 1974), American xylophone player
- Jake Hoffman (politician), Arizona state senator
