= Jake Hamon =

Jake Hamon may refer to:

- Jake L. Hamon Sr. (1873–1920), American oilman, attorney, and political figure
- Jake L. Hamon Jr. (1902–1985), American oilman and philanthropist
