= Jake Ruecroft =

English footballer

Personal information
- Full name: Jacob Ruecroft
- Date of birth: 1 May 1915
- Place of birth: Lanchester, England
- Date of death: February 2005 (aged 89)
- Position: Full back

Senior career*
Years	Team	Apps	(Gls)
- Goole Town
1938–1947	Halifax Town	60	(2)
1945	→ Leeds United (war guest)	2	(0)
1946	→ Lincoln City (war guest)	1	(0)
1947–1948	Scarborough		
1948–1949	Bradford City	43	(0)
- Goole Town
Total		106	(2)
- * Club domestic league appearances and goals

Jacob Ruecroft (1 May 1915 – February 2005) was an English professional footballer who played as a full back for Goole Town, Halifax Town, Scarborough and Bradford City. He also guested for Leeds United and Lincoln City during World War Two.
