= Jake Gray =

Jake Gray may refer to:

- Jake Gray (politician)
- Jake Gray, character in Devour (film)
- Jake Gray (footballer) (born 1995), English football player
