= Jake Spencer =

Jake Spencer may refer to:

- Jake Spencer (footballer) (born 1989), Australian rules footballer
- Jacob Spencer, a fictional character in General Hospital
