= Jake O'Brien =

Jake O'Brien may refer to:

- Jake O'Brien (basketball), American basketball player
- Jake O'Brien (ice hockey), Canadian ice hockey player
- Jake O'Brien (fighter), American martial artist
- Jake O'Brien (footballer), Irish footballer
