= Jake Rogers =

Jake Rogers may refer to:

- Jake Rogers (baseball) (born 1995), American baseball player
- Jake Rogers (footballer) (born 2005), Australian rules footballer
- Jake Wesley Rogers (born 1996), American musician
