= Jake Armstrong =

Jake Armstrong may refer to:

- Jake Armstrong, fictional character in The Secret Circle (TV series)
- Jake Armstrong (rugby union) (born 1994), English rugby union player
