= Jacob C. Miller =

Union soldier

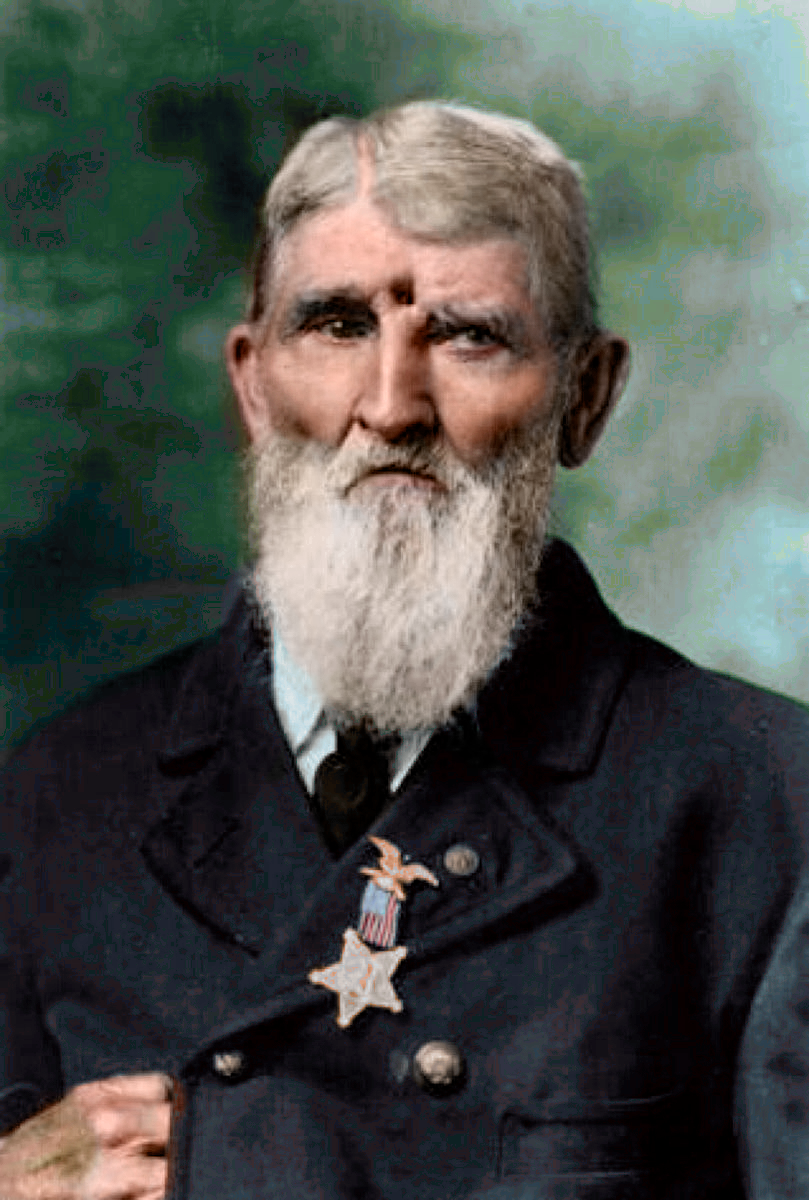
- Colorized photo of Jacob Miller in 1910
- Born: August 4, 1840; Bellevue, Huron County, Ohio
- Died: January 13, 1917 (aged 76); Omaha, Douglas County, Nebraska
- Military career
- Allegiance: Union
- Branch: Army
- Service years: 1861-1864
- Rank: Private
- Units: Company G, 113th Illinois Volunteer Infantry
- Conflicts: American Civil War; Siege of Vicksburg; Battle of Chickamauga
- Awards: Medal of Honor

Jacob C. Miller (August 4, 1840 - January 13, 1917) was a Union soldier who was awarded the Medal of Honor for gallantry against Confederate forces at the Siege of Vicksburg on May 22, 1863. Following this, he was shot in the head at the Battle of Chickamauga on September 19, 1863, and survived for fifty-four years afterwards.

== Biography ==
Jacob was born in Bellevue, Ohio in 1840 and lived a quiet life until 1861 when the Civil War began. Jacob enlisted in the Union Army and was placed in Company G of the 113th Illinois Volunteer Infantry Regiment.

Jacob fought in the Siege of Vicksburg and on May 22, 1863, charged head on into Confederate forces in a "volunteer storming party." After surviving the Siege, he once again saw combat at the Battle of Chickamauga. On September 19, 1863, Jacob was shot directly between the eyebrows by a Confederate musket and was left for dead. Jacob had to sneak through Confederate forces in order to be picked up by an ambulance train and escorted to Chattanooga, Tennessee. Jacob's wounds were left untreated for nine months and he only received medical attention once he made it to Logansport, Indiana, where doctors removed most of the buckshot.

In 1880, a fragment from the bullet fell out of the wound and again in 1911. Following the war, Jacob received the Medal of Honor on August 20, 1894, and lived out the rest of his life with the scar left by the bullet. Jacob died in 1917 in Omaha, Nebraska.
