= Jake Mathews =

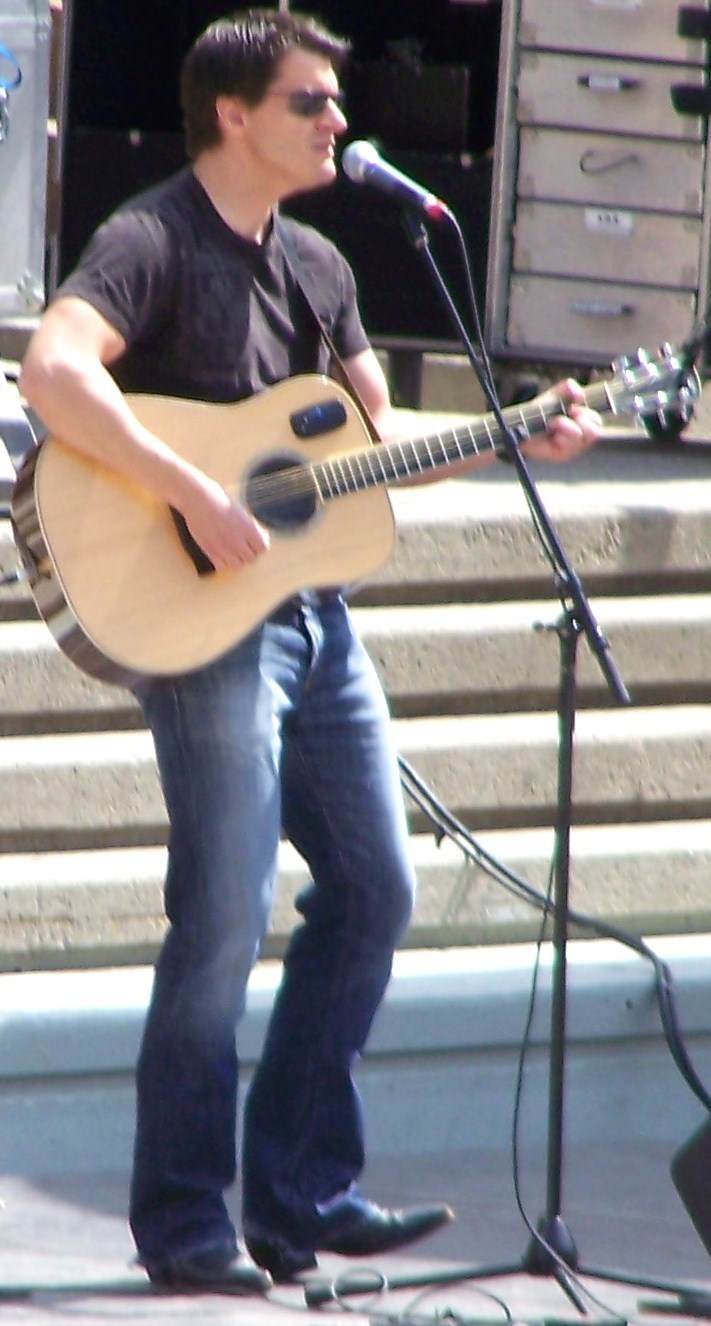

Background information
- Birth name: Jacques Lagrandeur
- Born: March 14, 1971 (age 54)
- Origin: Sudbury, Ontario, Canada
- Genres: Country
- Occupation(s): Singer, songwriter
- Years active: 2001–present
- Labels: Royalty, Open Road
- Website: www.jakemathews.com

Jake Mathews (born Jacques Lagrandeur born March 14, 1971, in Sudbury, Ontario, Canada) is a Canadian country music singer, songwriter and performer.

== Career ==
Jake's self-titled debut CD (Jake Mathews) garnered six nationally charted hits: "I’ll Do You One Better," "Try Again Tomorrow," "That's How Long," "Rush," "I’m Gone" and "There Ain't No Such Thing."

His second CD, Time After Time, released in 2004, was voted Best Album by Country Music News. Singles released from the album include the title track, "Signs of You Everywhere," "Kings for a Day" and "Arizona on My Mind."

Although he is the younger brother of Gil Grand, he has established a music career in his own right. In 2006, Mathews and Grand joined forces for "Raise the Roof," a tour that took them across Canada, raising awareness of Ronald McDonald House Charities.

== Discography ==
=== Albums ===
Title	Details
Jake Mathews	Release date: 2002; Label: Royalty Records
Time After Time	Release date: June 8, 2004; Label: Open Road Recordings
Red Tail Lights	Release date: July 12, 2011; Label: On Ramp Records

=== Singles ===
Year	Single	Peak positions		Album
Year	Single	CAN Country (Note: Peak positions from Radio & Records from 2004 to 2006, and Canada Country from 2010 to present.)	CAN	Album
2001	"Do You One Better"	×	—	Jake Mathews
2001	"That's How Long"	×	—	Jake Mathews
2002	"Rush"	×	—	Jake Mathews
2002	"You Put Me Together Again"	×	—	Jake Mathews
2003	"I'm Gone"	×	—	Jake Mathews
2003	"Try Again Tomorrow"	×	—	Jake Mathews
2004	"Time After Time"	19	—	Time After Time
2004	"Signs of You Everywhere"	23	—	Time After Time
2005	"Kings for a Day"	19	—	Time After Time
2006	"Arizona on My Mind"	24	—	Time After Time
2010	"If I Had It My Way"	9	97	Red Tail Lights
2011	"Forever's on Our Side"	47	—	Red Tail Lights
2011	"Might Take All Night"	36	—	Red Tail Lights
2012	"Red Tail Lights"	41	—	Red Tail Lights
2013	"Beer Necessities"	19	—	Non-album singles
2013	"A Woman and a Song"	36	—	Non-album singles
2014	"In Our Own Backyard"	—	—	Non-album singles
2015	"Road and the Radio"	—	—	Non-album singles
2020	"Workin' On Me"	—	—	
"—" denotes releases that did not chart "×" indicates that no relevant chart existed or was archived

=== Music videos ===
Year	Title	Director
2002	"Rush"	
2002	"You Put Me Together Again"	
2004	"Time After Time"	
2012	"Red Tail Lights"	
2014	"In Our Own Backyard"	Jeth Weinrich

== Awards and achievements ==
Western Country Music Awards

- 2005 – Nominated – Outstanding Country Recording for Time After Time
- 2003 – Nominated – Outstanding Country Recording for Jake Mathews

Country Music News 2004

- Time After Time voted Best Album

Canadian Country Music Awards

- 2005 – Nominated – Independent Male Artist of the Year
- 2004 – Nominated – Independent Male Artist of the Year
- 2003 – Nominated – Rising Star Award
- 2002 – Nominated – Rising Star Award
