= Brad Lebo =

American football player (born 1970)

Profile
- Position: Quarterback

Personal information
- Born: March 20, 1970 (age 56); Lewiston, Idaho, U.S.
- Listed height: 6 ft 4 in (1.93 m)
- Listed weight: 215 lb (98 kg)

Career information
- High school: Post Falls (Post Falls, Idaho); Lewiston
- College: Montana
- NFL draft: 1993: undrafted

Career history
- Cincinnati Bengals (1993)*; Arizona Rattlers (1994); New Orleans Saints (1994)*; Amsterdam Admirals (1995); Memphis Pharaohs (1996); Orlando Predators (1996–1997)
- * Offseason or practice squad member only

Awards and highlights
- ArenaBowl champion (1994)

Career AFL statistics
- Comp. / Att.: 116 / 225
- Passing yards: 1,461
- TD–INT: 20–12
- QB rating: 72.10
- Rushing TDs: 2
- Stats at ArenaFan.com

Brad Lebo (born March 20, 1970) is an American former professional football player who was a quarterback for three seasons in the Arena Football League (AFL) with the Arizona Rattlers, Memphis Pharaohs, and Orlando Predators. He played college football for the Montana Grizzlies. He was also a member of the Cincinnati Bengals, New Orleans Saints, and Amsterdam Admirals.

== College career ==
Lebo played for the Montana Grizzlies from 1989 to 1992. He recorded 6,717 career passing yards for the Grizzlies.

== Professional career ==
Lebo spent time with the Cincinnati Bengals of the National Football League (NFL) during the 1993 off-season. He played for the Arizona Rattlers of the AFL in 1994 as the backup to Sherdrick Bonner. He saw playing time as the Rattlers' starter in July 1994 when Bonner suffered an injury. The Rattlers won ArenaBowl VIII 36–31 against the Orlando Predators on September 2, 1994. Lebo attended training camp with the New Orleans Saints of the NFL during the 1994 off-season. He played for the Amsterdam Admirals of the World League of American Football in 1995. The Admirals advanced to World Bowl '95, where they lost to the Frankfurt Galaxy. He first played for the AFL's Memphis Pharaohs during the 1996 Arena Football League season. Lebo played for the Orlando Predators of the AFL from 1996 to 1997. He saw time as the Predators' starter in July 1996 when Pat O'Hara suffered an injury.
