= Jake Kaner =

Educator (born 1959)

Professor Jake Kaner (born 1959) is Associate Dean of Research at the School of Art and Design, Nottingham Trent University. He was previously Head of Research and Professor of Furniture at Buckinghamshire New University, and an editorial board member of the Institute of Conservation.

In 2005, he was awarded a grant by Arts and Humanities Research Council to create an Electronic Furniture Archive of High Wycombe, launched in 2009. In 2004, he was called upon to create replica furniture for the 78 Derngate Charles Rennie Mackintosh project in Northampton of certain Mackintosh originals. In 2013 he was invited to join the REF14 sub panel UoA34 Art and Design: History, Practice and Theory.

== Books ==
In 2010 Kaner published 'Early Plastics in Furniture 1880-1920: Chemistry, conservation, history and manufacture'.

In 2012 he co-authored 'Conservation of 20th Century Furniture (Routledge Series in Conservation and Museology)' with Clive Edwards.
