= Jackes =

Jackes is a surname that may refer to:

- Albert G. Jackes (1844–1888), Canadian politician and medical doctor
- Art Jackes (1924–2000), Canadian high jumper
- Betsy Rivers Jackes (born 1935), Australian botanist
- Franklin Jackes (1804–1852), Canadian baker and politician
- Norway Jackes (1881–1964), Canadian rower

== See also ==
- Jakes (surname)
