= Jakeš (disambiguation) =

Jakeš is a village in Vukosavlje municipality, Bosnia and Herzegovina. It may also refer to:

- Miloš Jakeš (1922-2020), General Secretary of the Communist Party of Czechoslovakia
- Petr Jakeš (1940–2005), Czech geologist

== See also ==
- Jakes (disambiguation)
