= Big Jake (disambiguation) =

Big Jake is a 1971 Western film.

Big Jake may also refer to:

- Big Jake (lobster), a large lobster
- Big Jake (horse), a large horse
- Big Jake, a character in Jay Jay the Jet Plane

== See also ==
- Big Brother Jake
- Big Rude Jake
- Jake (disambiguation)
