= Clark's Tree =

Sculpture in Long Beach, Washington

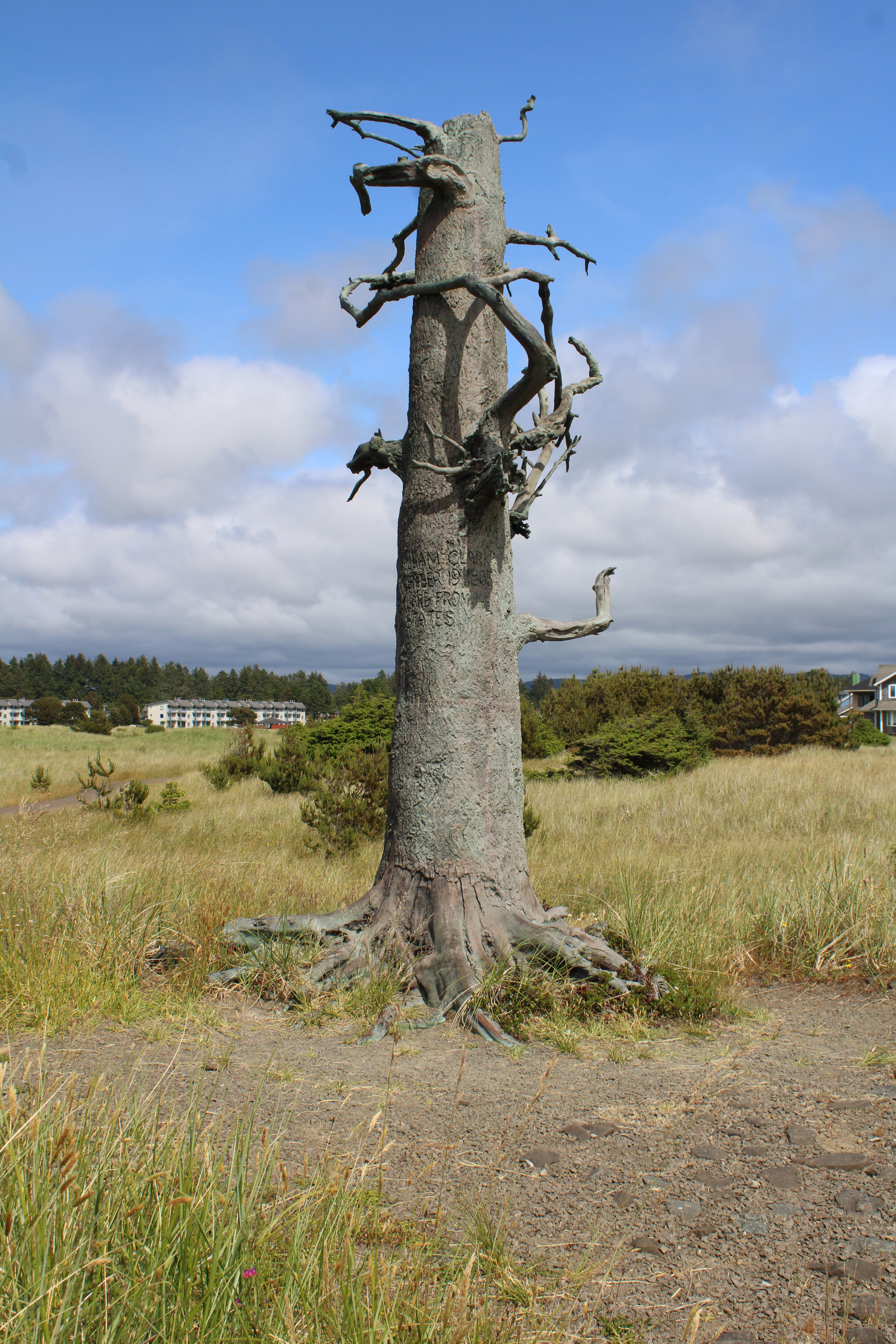
- William Clark's Tree memorial.
- Artist: Stanley Wanlass
- Year: 2003
- Medium: Lost-wax cast bronze
- Subject: Lewis and Clark Expedition 1805 arrival at the Pacific Ocean
- Location: Long Beach, Washington; 46.37118°N 124.06182°W

Clark's Tree is a bronze memorial sculpture in Long Beach, Washington commemorating Lewis and Clark's journey across North America. It sits on a dune above the Pacific Ocean beach at Breakers near where Clark carved a message on a living tree to establish United States precedence of discovery and occupation in what was then the Oregon Country. The memorial was created by Stanley Wanlass, a sculptor educated at Brigham Young University. The sculpture marks the westernmost and northernmost point of Lewis and Clark's journey on the Pacific coast.

The sculpture was built in Clarkston, then barged down the Columbia River in 2003 with stops for public viewing in Richland, Hood River, Portland and Vancouver, then into the Pacific Ocean to reach Long Beach. In the process the sculpture was nearly lost at sea, according to Wanlass.

Another marker with the same name was constructed in 1932 at 3rd and Pacific in Long Beach's downtown area.
