= Jakes (surname) =

Jakes or Jakeš is a surname that may refer to:

== Jakes ==
- James Jakes (born 1987), British racing driver
- John Jakes (born 1932), American novelist
- Leigh Jakes (born 1988), American association football player
- T. D. Jakes (born 1957), American pastor
- Tyler Jakes, American musician, songwriter, and producer
- Van Jakes (born 1961), former professional American footballer

== Jakeš ==
- Adolf Jakeš (born 1943), Czech sports shooter
- Jiří Jakeš (born 1982), Czech ice hockey player
- Miloš Jakeš (1922–2020), General Secretary of the Communist Party of Czechoslovakia (1987–1989)
- Petr Jakeš (1940–2005), Czech geologist

== See also ==
- Jackes
