= Jake =

Jake may refer to:

== Name ==
- Jake (given name), including a list of persons and fictional characters with the name
- Jake (gamer), American Overwatch player and coach
- Katrin Jäke (born c. 1975), German swimmer
- Jake, a member of the band Enhypen

== Animals ==
- Jake (rescue dog), a search and rescue dog in the United States
- Jake, a young male wild turkey

== Slang ==
- Jake, a slang term in the United States for Jamaica ginger extract
- Jake, a slang term used in Discordianism to describe a prank, often celebrated on Jake Day

== Other uses ==
- Jake the Alligator Man, an oddity on view in Long Beach, Washington
- Jake the Dog, a character from the Cartoon Network series Adventure Time
- Jake brake, an engine braking mechanism installed on some diesel engines
- Allied reporting name of the Aichi E13A, a Japanese World War II reconnaissance floatplane
- "The Jake," nickname of the Major League Baseball stadium once known as Jacobs Field, now Progressive Field
- Jake / Bot2, one of the remotely operated vehicles used during the filming of the documentary Ghosts of the Abyss

== See also ==
- Jvke (born 2001), American entertainer
- Jakes (disambiguation)
