= Franklin Jackes =

Canadian politician

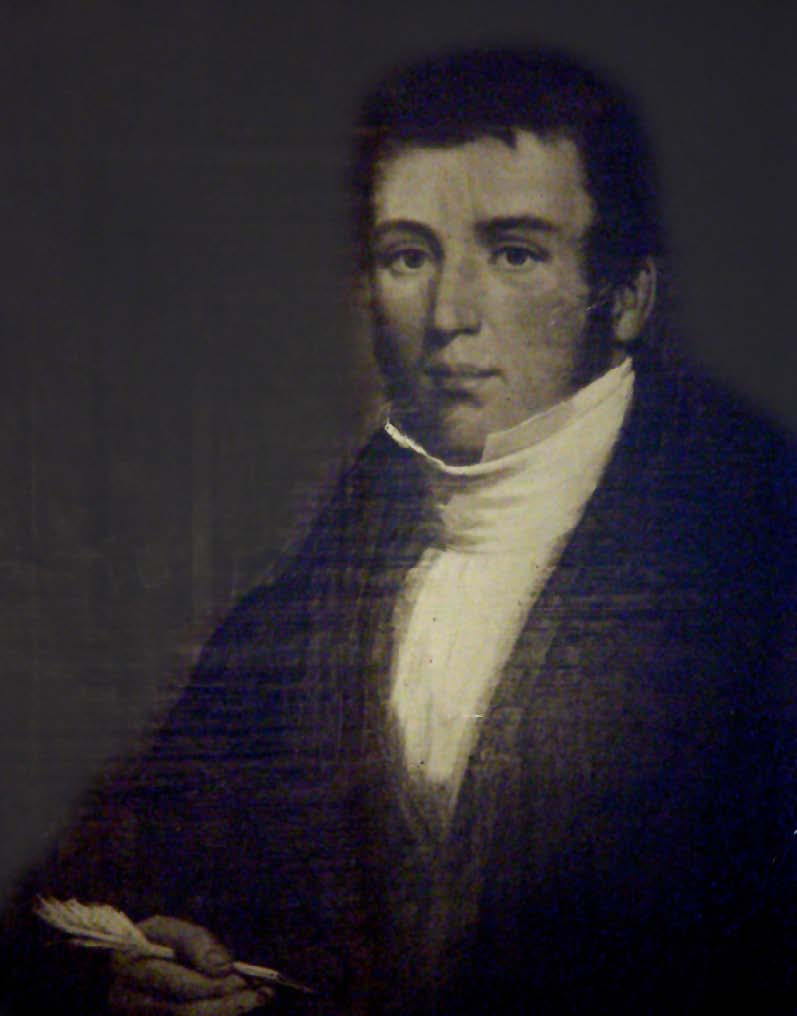
- Franklin Jackes, first Warden of York

Personal details
- Born: 3 March 1804 London, England
- Died: 16 April 1852 (aged 48) Toronto, Canada West
- Party: Reformer
- Spouse: Catherine Gibson
- Profession: Baker, Politician

Franklin Jackes (3 March 1804 – 16 April 1852) was an early Torontonian politician of the Reform movement.

== Early life ==
Franklin Jackes was born in London, England, the third child of William Jackes and Catharine Palmer. He had a twin brother who was named Napoleon, but who died in infancy. At the age of eight Franklin Jackes moved with his family to New York City in 1812, however he returned to Europe to serve in the army of the Duke of Wellington as an apprentice baker during the Battle of Waterloo. He then returned to New York City and subsequently moved to Toronto with his family in 1817. There he became a baker, known in particular for his high-quality horse cakes which were sold for half a penny each.

In 1825, while walking along the harbour of Toronto Jackes encountered the wealthy miller Benjamin Thorne who was offering to sell his fleet of flour for five pounds, at such a low price because he believed it had sunk in Lake Ontario due to its extreme tardiness. Jackes agreed to buy his wares, and the fleet arrived the same afternoon, making him a wealthy man.

In the spring of 1842, he bought a house known as Castlefield from a prominent Torontonian lawyer and politician named James Hervey Price for the price of 985 Spanish dollars, as well as other large amounts of land in modern-day Toronto. The red-brick Neo-Gothic residence had four crenellated turrets, east of present-day Duplex Avenue. The property was sold to developers in 1885, and demolished in 1918. The site was found to be the site of Iroquoian village.

=== Family ===
Franklin Jackes married Catherine Gibson (28 February 1808 – 18 November 1886) at Niagara-on-the-Lake on 11 November 1825 at the age of 19. They remained married until his death and had eleven children, one of whom was Albert G. Jackes, a doctor in the army of William McDougall and member of the Council of Keewatin, in modern-day Manitoba.

Franklin Jackes was a good friend of James Hervey Price, and named one of his children Price in his honour. His wife Catherine Jackes also adopted two more children after her husband's death.

Another son, Franklin Jackes (1830–1884), was elected to the first borough council of Armidale, New South Wales, Australia, although declining the honour to become the first mayor. Also similar to Franklin Jackes senior, Franklin junior was a magistrate, and a returning officer. Following the Castlefield name, the Armidale family property was called Orchardfield.

Another son, James Alexander Jackes (–1923), settled in Ipswich, Queensland, Australia. In line with Franklin senior and Franklin junior, he called his orchard property Orangefield, as well as naming one of his own residences Toronto.

A grandson, John Baird Laidlaw, was elected an alderman on Toronto City Council in 1934 and ran unsuccessfully for mayor in 1937.

== Political career ==
Franklin Jackes was a devout Reformer before and during the Upper Canada Rebellion of 1837, and was a supporter and personal friend of William Lyon Mackenzie. He was a member of the Committee of 1 000 which asked Sir John Colborne to dissolve parliament in 1831, and was elected to Toronto’s first city council to represent St. David's Ward in 1834. In that year he moved to have Mackenzie elected as the first mayor of Toronto by the council.

He was also commissioned as a justice of the peace in 1837, despite having taken part in the Upper Canada Rebellion in the same year. He was also a member of the Toronto Agricultural Committee, and was the first warden of the York County, Ontario for two terms from 1850–1851, as well as the first reeve of the Township of York for the same period.

His eldest son, William Jackes, also served on the council of the Township of York and was elected deputy reeve for a total of six terms.

== Death ==
At the age of 48, Franklin Jackes contracted smallpox and died soon after. Leaving his wife with eleven children, the funeral procession included nearly eighty carriages, containing mechanics to members of parliament.

Jackes Avenue, Toronto, off Yonge Street, is named for him.
