= Břehy (Pardubice District) =

- Municipality
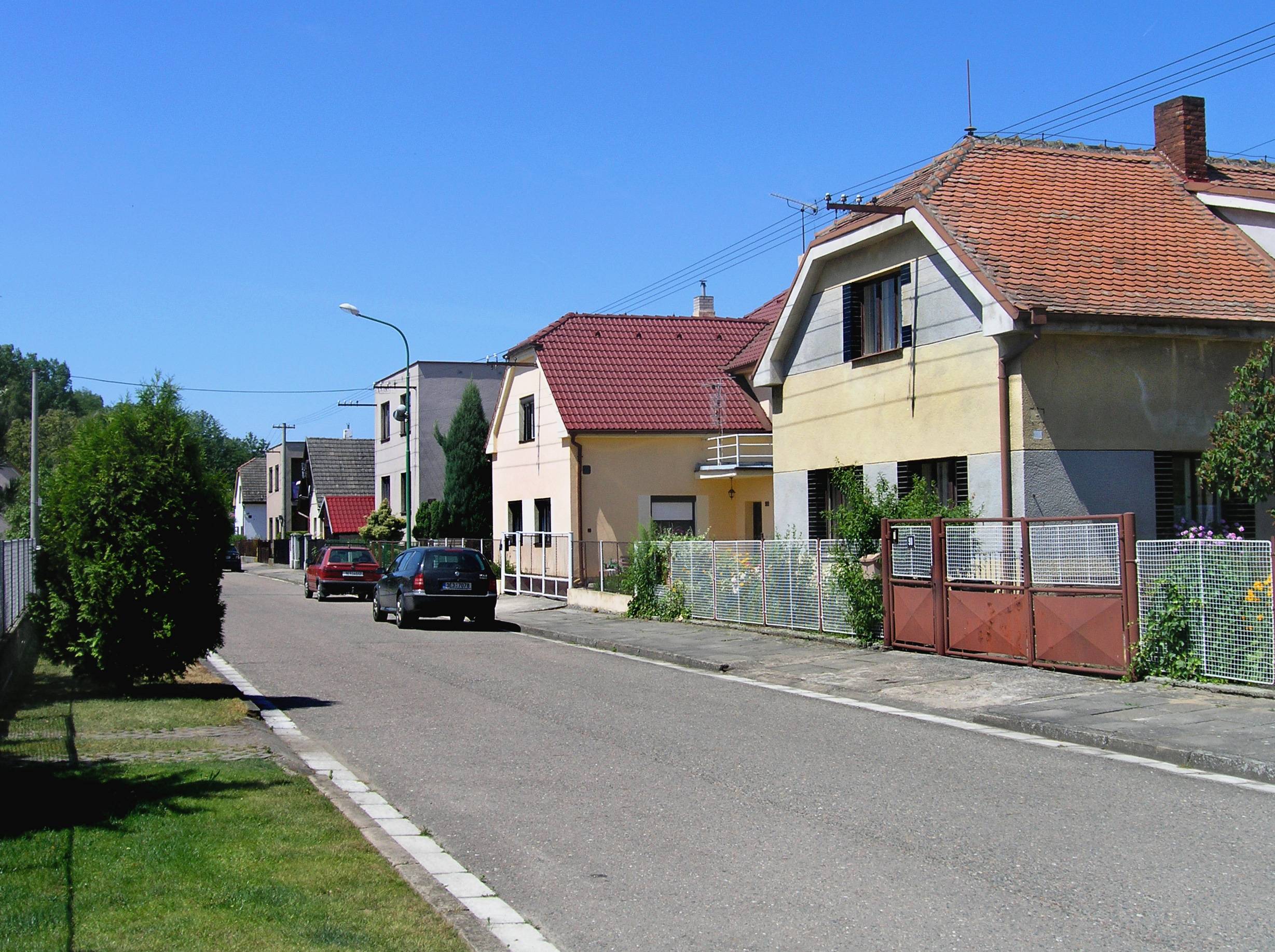
- Dlouhá street

- Flag Coat of arms

- Location in the Czech Republic
- Coordinates: 50°3′7″N 15°34′39″E
- Country: Czech Republic
- Region: Pardubice
- District: Pardubice
- First mentioned: 1085

Area
  - Total: 11.32 km^{2} (4.37 sq mi)
- Elevation: 211 m (692 ft)

Population (2026-01-01)
  - Total: 1,129
  - Density: 99.73/km^{2} (258.3/sq mi)
- Time zone: UTC+1 (CET)
  - Summer (DST): UTC+2 (CEST)
- Postal code: 535 01
- Website: www.obecbrehy.cz

Břehy is a municipality and village in Pardubice District in the Pardubice Region of the Czech Republic. It has about 1,100 inhabitants.

== Demographics ==
Historical population
Year	Pop.	±%
1869	400	—
1880	452	+13.0%
1890	450	−0.4%
1900	427	−5.1%
1910	502	+17.6%
1921	508	+1.2%
1930	545	+7.3%
1950	678	+24.4%
1961	768	+13.3%
1970	806	+4.9%
1980	860	+6.7%
1991	891	+3.6%
2001	919	+3.1%
2011	950	+3.4%
2021	1,077	+13.4%
Source: Censuses

== Notable people ==
- Petr Jakeš (1940–2005), geologist
