= World's Largest Frying Pan =

Public sculpture in Washington

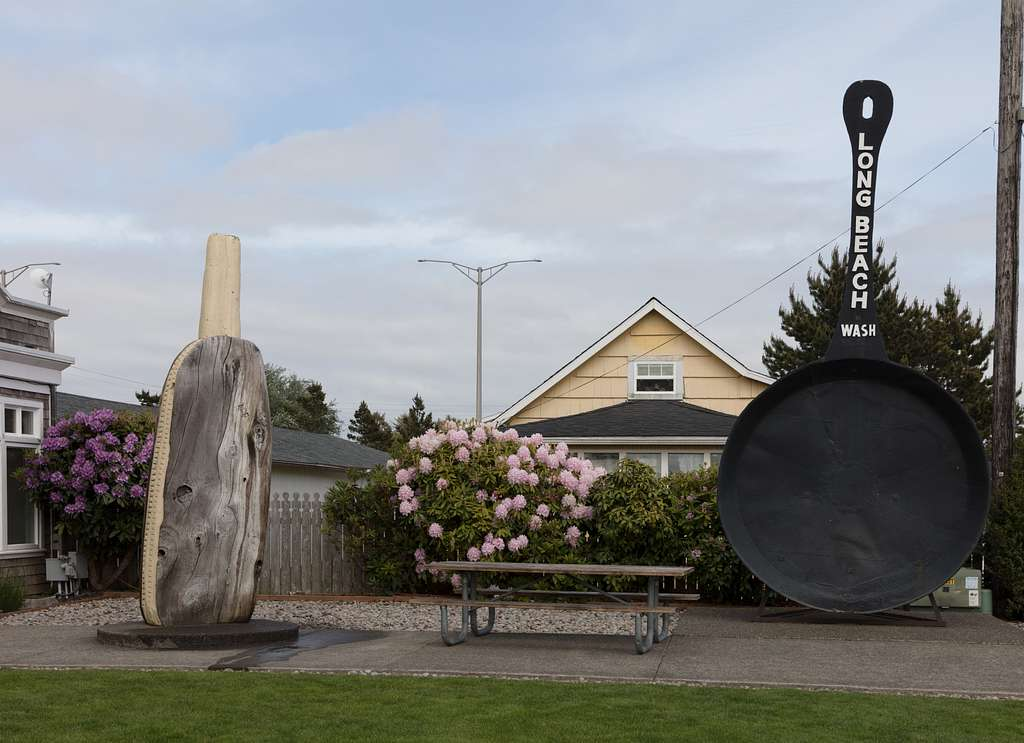
- The frying pan on the right
- Artist: Northwest Copper and Sheet Metal Works
- Year: 1941
- Medium: Copper, fiberglass
- Subject: Frying pan
- Dimensions: 9.5 ft (2.9 m) wide 20 ft (6.1 m) tall
- Weight: 1,300 lb (590 kg)
- 46.3490°N 124.0543°W

World's Largest Frying Pan, also known as Washington's Largest Frying Pan, is a public sculpture of a frying pan in Long Beach, Washington. It was created in 1941 by the Northwest Copper and Sheet Metal Works. It is not actually the world's largest frying pan, although it is the only large frying pan that has been used to cook food. It is also older than all other frying pans that claim to be the largest, making it the World's Oldest Largest Frying Pan.

== History ==
The Long Beach Chamber commissioned the sculpture in 1941 from the Northwest Copper and Sheet Metal Works to promote their first annual clam festival. The clam fritter that was cooked on the pan by Wellington Marsh Sr. required 200 lb (91 kg) of clams to make. It took 20 minutes to cook to a golden brown and was quickly eaten. In 1942, 20,000 people showed up to eat the 9 ft (2.7 m) cake that was cooked.

The pan continued advertising the clam festival throughout the Western United States, even going to Los Angeles in 1952. When not traveling, it hung outside Marsh's Free Museum and became gradually rustier. It was planned to be scrapped, but Everett L. Mosher, a retired fisherman, had fond memories of the pan and wanted to restore it. When restoring the pan, over 300 signatures and 6 bullet holes were found. The pan was not able to be fully repaired, and the handle is the only original part of the pan today. The recreation was made from fiberglass.
