= Jakes =

Jakes may refer to:

- Jakes (surname)
- Jakes (toilet), a type of toilet in a small structure separate from the main building which does not have a flush or sewer attached
- Jakes Mulholland (20th century), American soccer player
- A slang term for the police

== See also ==
- Jake (disambiguation)
