= Breakers station =

Former railroad stop on Long Beach Peninsula, Washington

Coordinates: 46°22′15″N 124°03′03″W

Breakers Station was a mail and passenger stop on the Ilwaco Railway and Navigation Company line on the Long Beach Peninsula in Washington. It was originally called Tioga. In 1917 it was listed as a town 5 miles (8.0 km) north of Long Beach, Washington.

Resort subdivision and Ilwaco railroad station at the north boundary of the town of Long Beach in the 1890s and early 1900s. The Tioga Hotel was the main focus of the resort and gave the railroad station its name. The surrounding beach was lined with vacation cottages and tents. J. M. Arthur, proprietor of the hotel, later built the Breakers Hotel (north of the Tioga Hotel) in 1901. Tioga is an Iroquois word meaning "where it forks". The hotel and station are long gone. Tioga is now within the city limits of Long Beach. The name is no longer found on maps.

The stop at the Breakers Hotel north of Long Beach was called "Breakers Station." There had been two hotels at this location, both built by Joseph M. Arthur, and both named the Breakers Hotel. The first Breakers Hotel, built in 1901, burned down in 1904. The second one, pictured in the images here, replaced it. The image at right shows the Breakers Hotel from the beach side looking east. The hotel was built just behind a sand dune, and the rail line ran between the hotel and the trees in the background. A promotional postcard for the second Breakers Hotel advertised it as the "social center of the summer season," with the "best ladies' orchestra," a "large dancing pavilion," and "practically fire-proof." Guests were encouraged to "buy your ticket and check your baggage at any O.R.& N Co. Ticket Office direct to Breakers Station"

As of 2017 a fourth hotel occupies the location.

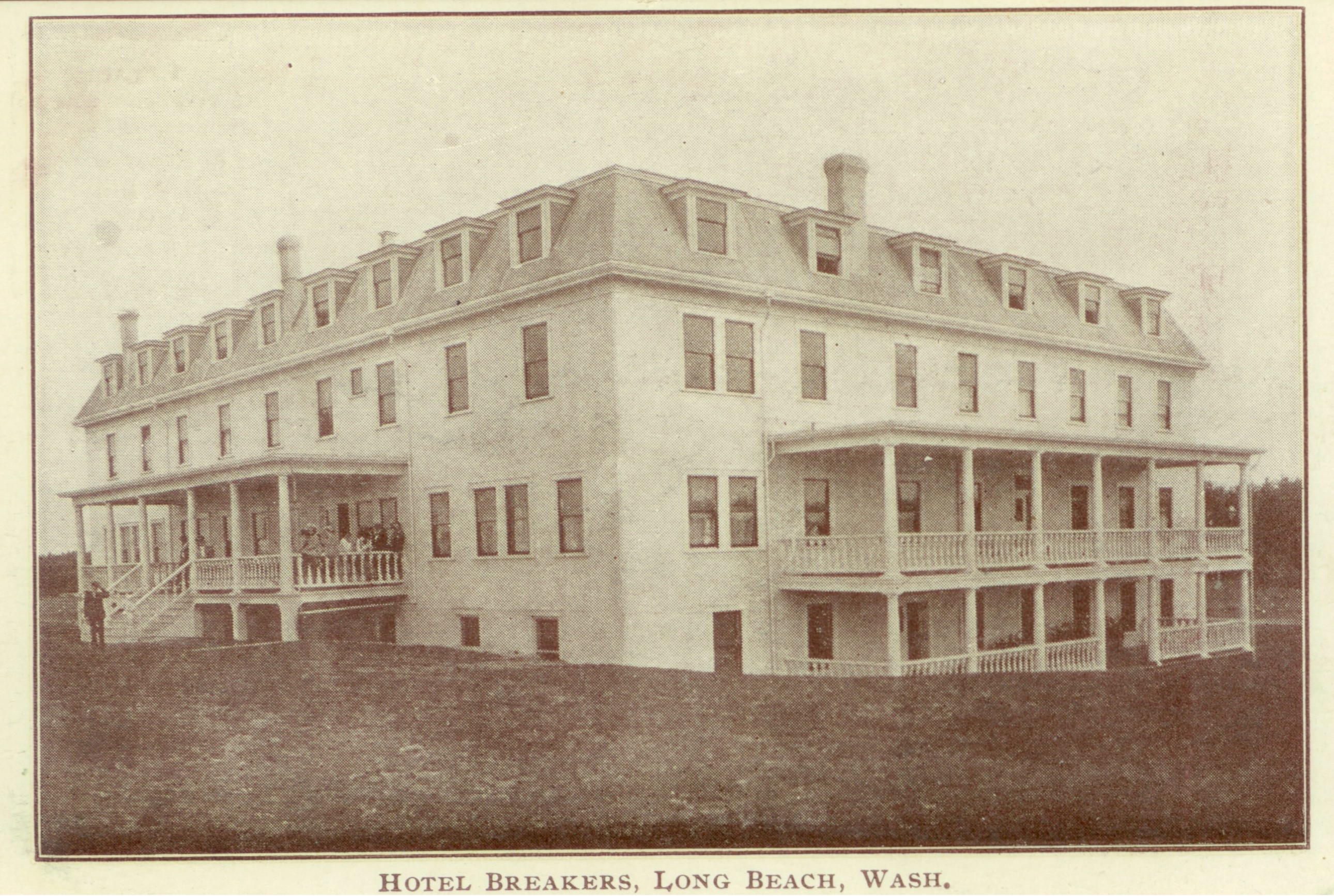
Breakers Hotel, Long Beach, WA, looking east from beach

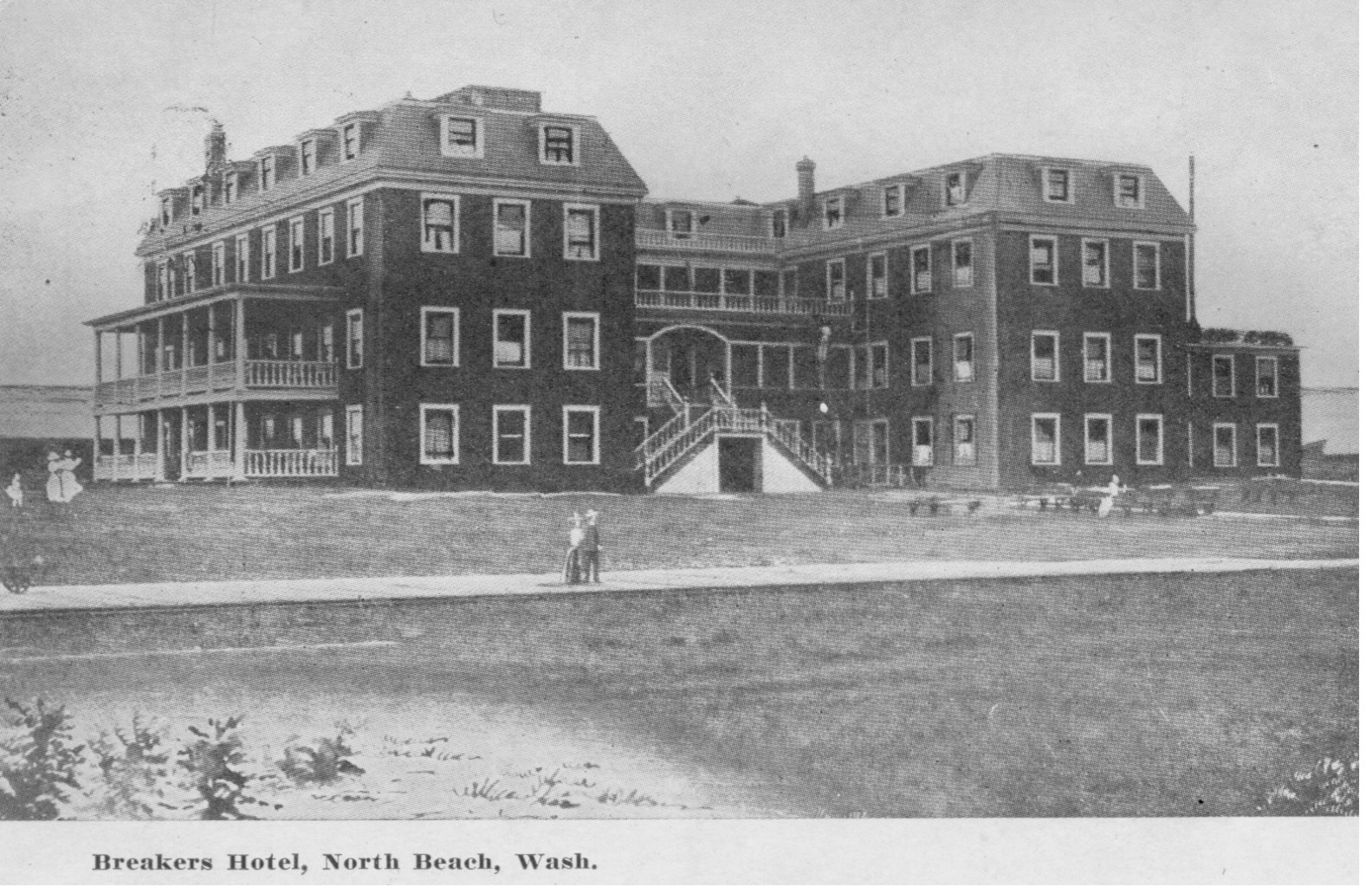
Breakers Hotel looking west
