= Albert G. Jackes =

Canadian politician

Albert G. Jackes (1844 – February 8, 1888) was an early Canadian politician and medical doctor. Jackes served on the short-lived Council of Keewatin.

== Early life ==
Jackes was born in Yorkville, Canada West in 1844, the son of Franklin Jackes and his wife, Catherine. He grew up in Ontario and went to the University of Toronto. He graduated from the University of Toronto with honors in 1864. After university he moved to New York City to begin apprenticing in a medical practice with Dr. Louis Bauer. A couple years later he moved west to St. Louis to begin practicing medicine on his own. His health began to fail and he returned to Canada.

Jackes began his rise to fame after he received his first medical appointment by Lieutenant Governor William McDougall. He traveled with McDougall in the Northwest Territories shortly after the territory was created.

From 1871 until 1873 Jackes ran a medical practice in Portage la Prairie. He moved to Winnipeg and continued practicing until 1877.

== Political career ==
Jackes was appointed to serve on the Council of Keewatin, the short lived government for the District of Keewatin territory on November 25, 1876. His persistent health issues flared up and he was the only member of the council to miss the throne speech by Alexander Morris on November 30, 1876 Jackes submitted his resignation with the rest of the council on April 16, 1877.

== Later life ==
He married his wife Mary Jane Blair February 6, 1882 in Toronto. He died on February 8, 1888, from a case of bronchitis that developed from a cold he caught on New Year's Eve.
