= Jake the Alligator Man =

Tourist attraction

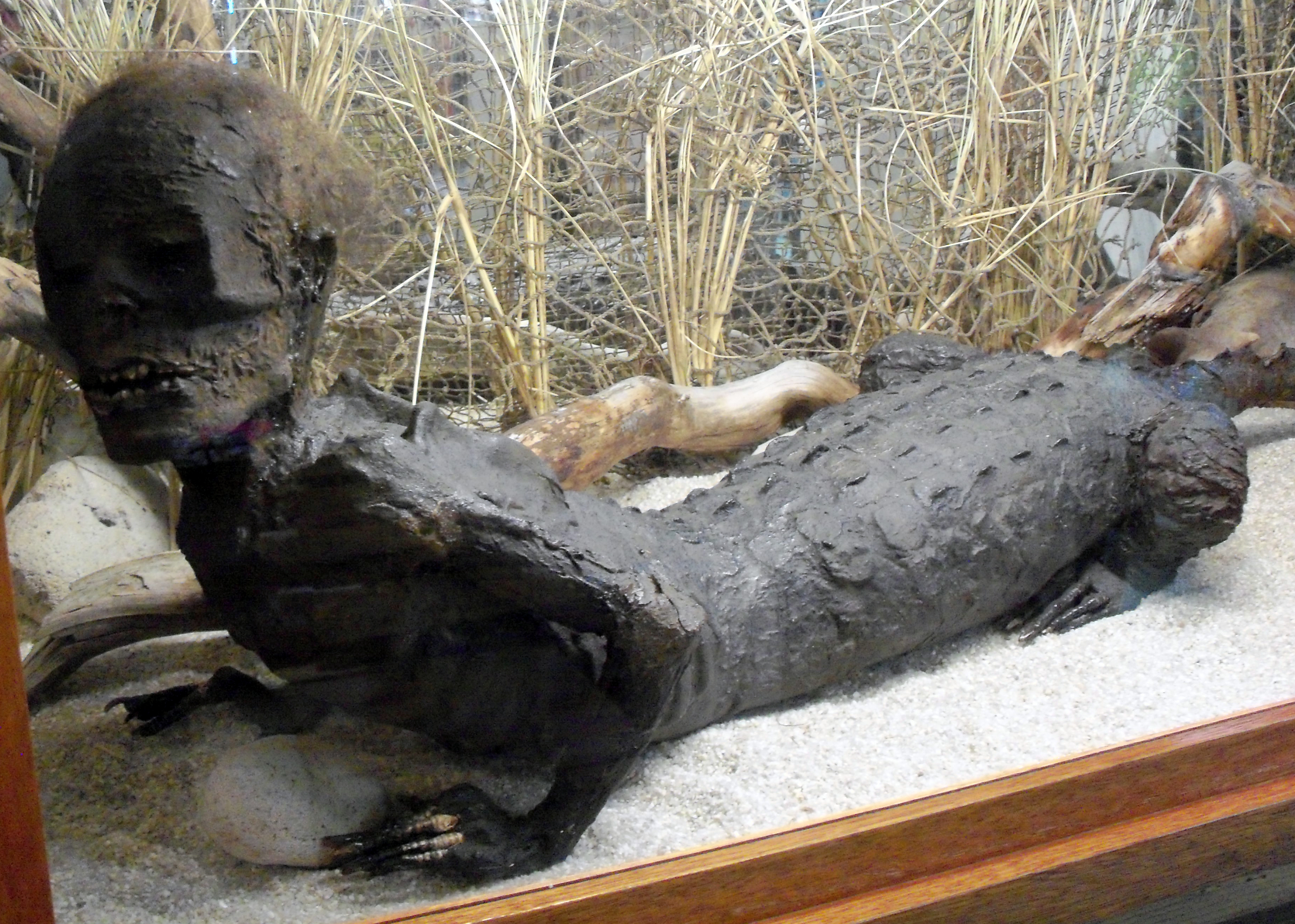
Jake in his display case at Marsh's Free Museum in Long Beach, Washington

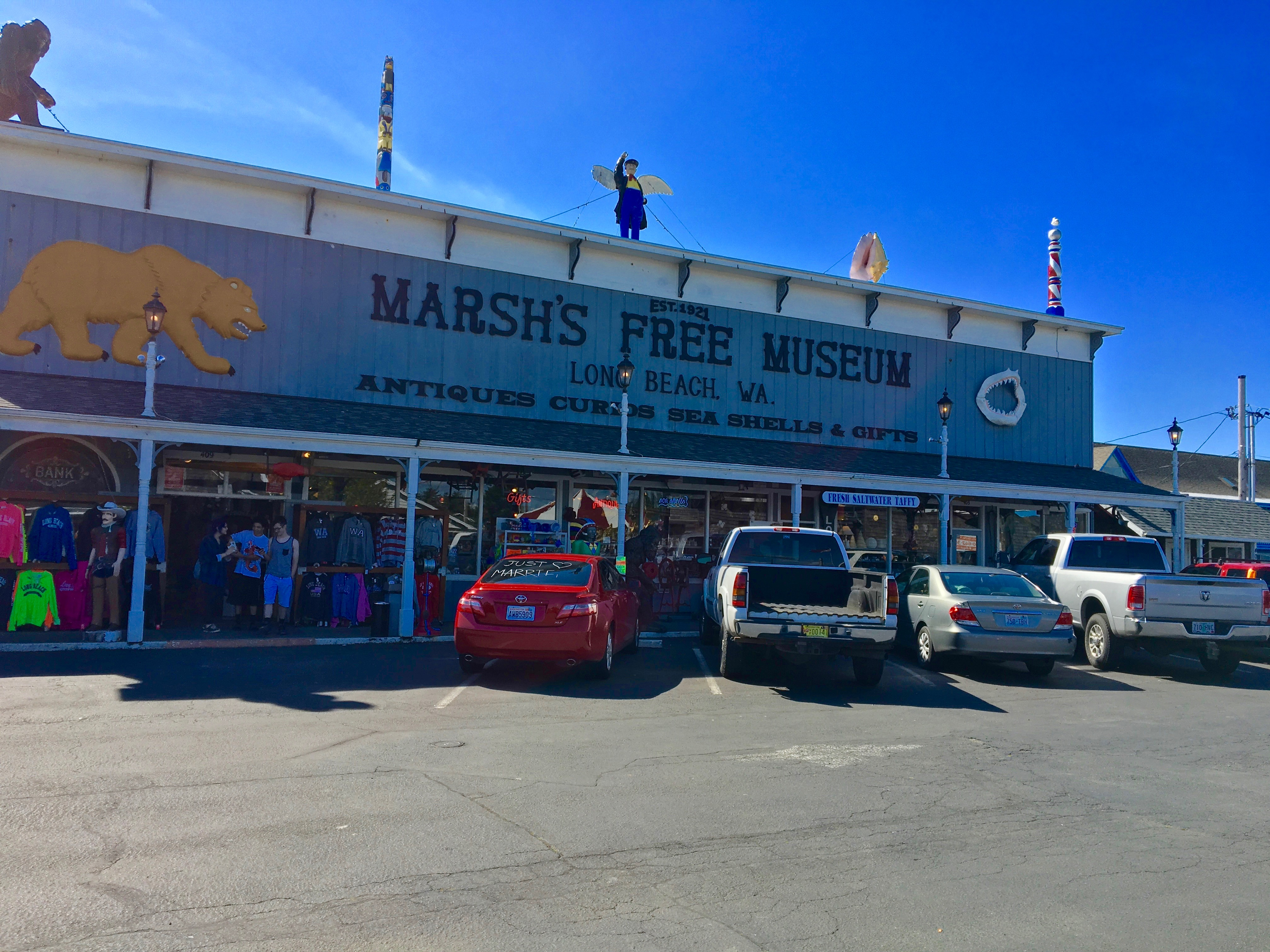
Marsh's Free Museum, where Jake is located

Jake the Alligator Man is an alleged half-man, half-alligator creature on display in apparently mummified condition at Marsh's Free Museum, a tourist trap located at 409 South Pacific Avenue in Long Beach, Washington. He was acquired by the museum for $750 in 1967 from an antique store.

A postcard image was used by the Weekly World News on November 9, 1993, for the front-page article "Half-human, half-alligator discovered in Florida swamp".

Jake has acquired a cult following in Northwestern popular culture. His birthday party is held annually in early August on the peninsula, and features events such as a bachelor party, car show, bridal contest, and live music.

== See also ==
- Fiji mermaid
- Jenny Haniver
- El Hombre Caimán
