= Big Jake (lobster) =

Lobster caught off Boston, (c. 1934–1984)

- Species: Homarus americanus
- Sex: Male
- Born: Approximately 1934; Atlantic Ocean off the coast of Massachusetts, United States
- Died: January 9, 1984 (aged 49–50); Logan International Airport, East Boston, Massachusetts
- Known for: Being a 25lb lobster that was flown crosscountry
- Owners: Jeffrey Pyska of Anchorage, Alaska

Big Jake was a famous lobster caught off the coast of Boston, Massachusetts that was sold to Jeffrey Pyska of Anchorage, Alaska who requested a large lobster. Big Jake was a popular attraction due to his large size and weight, at 25 pounds, to Pyska's customers. Big Jake was being sold for $212 and was handled to such an extent that he became sick and ill. It was later decided that the lobster would be shipped back to Boston to be rehabilitated, but upon arrival to Logan International Airport, Big Jake was dying. The lobster was later flown back to Anchorage, where his owner is reported to have Jake taxidermied. The lobster gained even more popularity due to Associated Press stories throughout January 1984. The lobster is possibly the largest lobster ever flown in the United States.
