= Long Beach, Washington =

City in Washington, United States

- City
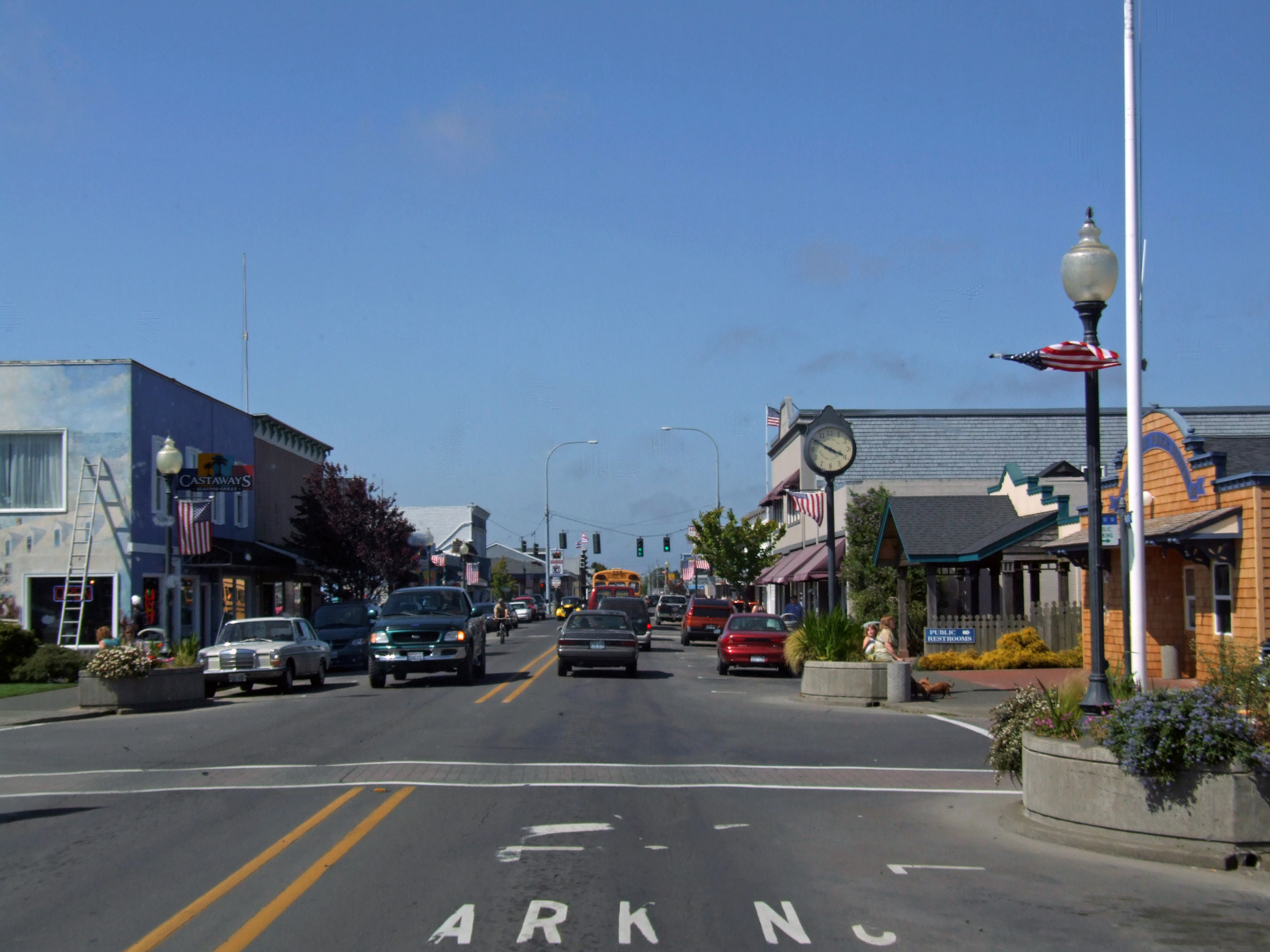
- Downtown Long Beach

- Location of Long Beach, Washington
- Coordinates: 46°21′53″N 124°03′30″W
- Country: United States
- State: Washington
- County: Pacific
- Incorporated: January 18, 1922

Government
  - Type: Mayor-council
  - Mayor: Sue Svendsen

Area
  - Total: 1.89 sq mi (4.90 km^{2})
  - Land: 1.38 sq mi (3.57 km^{2})
  - Water: 0.51 sq mi (1.33 km^{2})
- Elevation: 20 ft (6.1 m)

Population (2020)
  - Total: 1,688
  - Density: 1,220/sq mi (473/km^{2})
- Time zone: UTC-8 (PST)
  - Summer (DST): UTC-7 (PDT)
- ZIP Code: 98631
- Area code(s): 360, 564
- FIPS code: 53-40070
- GNIS feature ID: 2410867
- Website: City of Long Beach

Long Beach is a city in Pacific County, Washington, United States. The population was 1,688 at the 2020 census.

== History ==
Long Beach began when Henry Harrison Tinker bought a land claim from Charles E. Reed in 1880. He platted the town and called it "Tinkerville." Long Beach was officially incorporated on January 18, 1922. From 1889 to 1930, a narrow-gauge railroad called the Ilwaco Railway and Navigation Company ran up the whole peninsula.

The Long Beach depot was built between First and Second Streets on the east side of the track, which ran north along "B" Street. Two hotels were constructed near the depot by Tinker and later the Hanniman family; the latter was destroyed in a fire on December 6, 1914. The Driftwood Hotel was another common Long Beach destination.

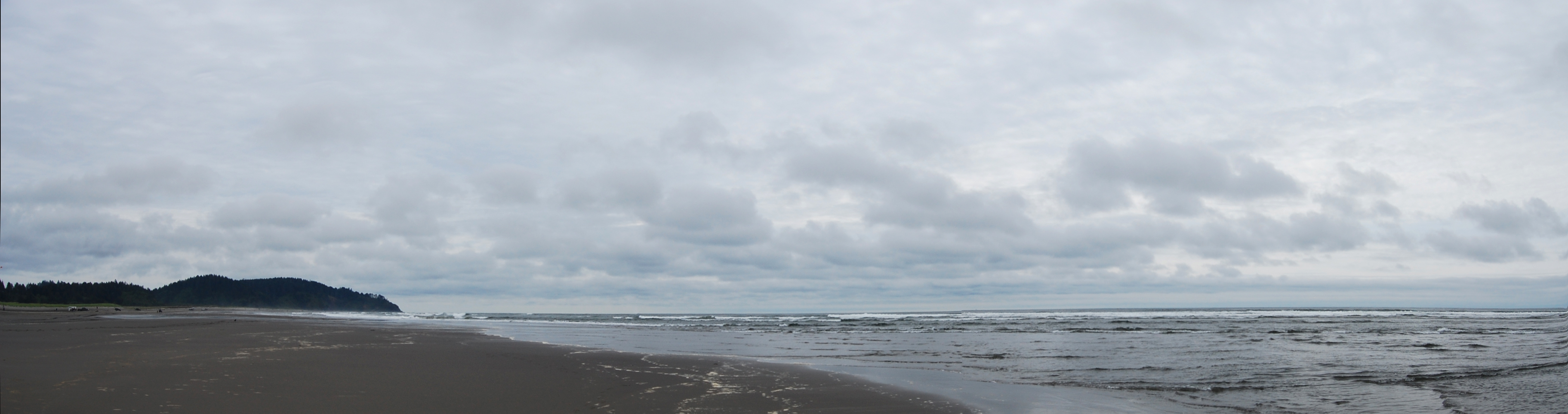
The Pacific Ocean and Long Beach

The boardwalk area near the station was known as "Rubberneck Row." Businesses existing in August 1911 that can be identified along Rubberneck Row from photographs (see images in this article) include, on the west side of the tracks, an establishment advertising "Baths" (possibly the Crystal Baths, an indoor swimming pool), Milton York Candies, a "Postal Shop," and a soda fountain just across from the station advertising "Milk Shake." A somewhat earlier photograph shows a sign for a livery stable immediately to the west across the tracks from Tinker's Hotel, followed (proceeding southwards) by a barber shop, "Vincent's Souvenirs," and "The Candy Man". A banner stretching above the tracks advertises a restaurant. The photo published by Feagans shows it was produced by H.A. Vincent, Ilwaco and Long Beach, who was probably the owner of Vincent's Souvenirs.

== Geography ==
Long Beach is located on the Long Beach Peninsula, which has a beach that spans 28 miles (45 km). According to the United States Census Bureau, the city has a total area of 1.35 square miles (3.50 km^{2}), all of it land.

=== Climate ===
According to the Köppen climate classification system, Long Beach and the Long Beach Peninsula have a moist (in winter), cool warm-summer mediterranean climate (Csb), with cool, but long, dry summers and mild winters. Both extreme hot and extreme cold are rare. The record high temperature is 99 °F (37 °C) on August 10, 1981, and June 27, 2021, and the record low is 0 °F (−18 °C) on December 8, 1972. Long Beach records nearly 80 inches (2,000 mm) of rainfall annually. Snow is far less common than rain, but can happen every once in a while.

Climate data for Long Beach, Washington (1991–2020 average)
Month	Jan	Feb	Mar	Apr	May	Jun	Jul	Aug	Sep	Oct	Nov	Dec	Year
Record high °F (°C)	65 (18)	74 (23)	73 (23)	84 (29)	95 (35)	99 (37)	95 (35)	99 (37)	92 (33)	90 (32)	72 (22)	64 (18)	99 (37)
Mean daily maximum °F (°C)	48.8 (9.3)	50.4 (10.2)	52.4 (11.3)	55.0 (12.8)	58.9 (14.9)	62.0 (16.7)	65.2 (18.4)	66.5 (19.2)	66.0 (18.9)	59.7 (15.4)	52.5 (11.4)	48.2 (9.0)	57.1 (13.9)
Mean daily minimum °F (°C)	35.9 (2.2)	35.4 (1.9)	37.3 (2.9)	40.2 (4.6)	45.1 (7.3)	48.9 (9.4)	51.8 (11.0)	51.6 (10.9)	47.9 (8.8)	42.2 (5.7)	38.2 (3.4)	35.8 (2.1)	42.5 (5.8)
Record low °F (°C)	8 (−13)	9 (−13)	25 (−4)	26 (−3)	30 (−1)	33 (1)	38 (3)	36 (2)	28 (−2)	21 (−6)	15 (−9)	0 (−18)	0 (−18)
Average rainfall inches (mm)	12.04 (306)	7.76 (197)	8.71 (221)	6.79 (172)	3.55 (90)	2.58 (66)	1.01 (26)	1.63 (41)	2.66 (68)	8.20 (208)	11.43 (290)	12.15 (309)	78.51 (1,994)
Average snowfall inches (cm)	0.2 (0.51)	0.3 (0.76)	0 (0)	0 (0)	0 (0)	0 (0)	0 (0)	0 (0)	0 (0)	0 (0)	0 (0)	0.1 (0.25)	0.6 (1.52)
Source 1: Weather.com
Source 2: NOAA

=== Earthquake and tsunami vulnerability ===
If a magnitude 9.0 earthquake were to hit the Cascadia subduction zone, emergency planners estimate the first tsunami waves could hit Long Beach 20 to 25 minutes later.

At a December 2016 open house, the city government presented initial plans for a proposed 32-foot (9.8 m) berm which could potentially accommodate 850 persons. The structure would have had a "modified prow," much like a ship looking out to sea. The shape was also designed to withstand the backwash from a tsunami. The total cost was estimated at $3.4 million, of which the Federal Emergency Management Agency (FEMA) was to pay 75%, the Emergency Management Division of Washington State 12.5%, and the City of Long Beach 12.5%. The project was abandoned in 2017 after new scientific reports indicated it was designed at least 14.5 feet (4.4 m) too short to withstand a worst-case tsunami.

== Demographics ==
Historical population
Census	Pop.	Note	%±
1930	396		—
1940	620		56.6%
1950	783		26.3%
1960	665		−15.1%
1970	968		45.6%
1980	1,199		23.9%
1990	1,236		3.1%
2000	1,283		3.8%
2010	1,392		8.5%
2020	1,688		21.3%
U.S. Decennial Census; 2020 Census

=== 2020 census ===
As of the 2020 census, Long Beach had a population of 1,688. The median age was 54.4 years. 14.5% of residents were under the age of 18 and 31.7% of residents were 65 years of age or older. For every 100 females there were 97.2 males, and for every 100 females age 18 and over there were 90.5 males age 18 and over.

100.0% of residents lived in urban areas, while 0.0% lived in rural areas.

There were 833 households in Long Beach, of which 19.0% had children under the age of 18 living in them. Of all households, 33.6% were married-couple households, 22.9% were households with a male householder and no spouse or partner present, and 34.9% were households with a female householder and no spouse or partner present. About 40.8% of all households were made up of individuals and 22.0% had someone living alone who was 65 years of age or older.

There were 1,386 housing units, of which 39.9% were vacant. The homeowner vacancy rate was 1.6% and the rental vacancy rate was 4.4%.

Racial composition as of the 2020 census
Race	Number	Percent
White	1,407	83.4%
Black or African American	11	0.7%
American Indian and Alaska Native	21	1.2%
Asian	21	1.2%
Native Hawaiian and Other Pacific Islander	4	0.2%
Some other race	57	3.4%
Two or more races	167	9.9%
Hispanic or Latino (of any race)	161	9.5%

=== 2010 census ===
As of the 2010 census, there were 1,392 people, 726 households, and 342 families residing in the city. The population density was 1,031.1 inhabitants per square mile (398.1/km^{2}). There were 1,564 housing units at an average density of 1,158.5 per square mile (447.3/km^{2}). The racial makeup of the city was 91.5% White, 0.1% African American, 0.8% Native American, 1.3% Asian, 0.2% Pacific Islander, 3.7% from other races, and 2.5% from two or more races. Hispanic or Latino of any race were 7.7% of the population.

There were 726 households, of which 15.4% had children under the age of 18 living with them, 33.9% were married couples living together, 9.1% had a female householder with no husband present, 4.1% had a male householder with no wife present, and 52.9% were non-families. 44.8% of all households were made up of individuals, and 18.8% had someone living alone who was 65 years of age or older. The average household size was 1.85 and the average family size was 2.54.

The median age in the city was 50.1 years. 14.5% of residents were under the age of 18; 8.5% were between the ages of 18 and 24; 20.1% were from 25 to 44; 32.1% were from 45 to 64; and 24.6% were 65 years of age or older. The gender makeup of the city was 47.8% male and 52.2% female.

=== 2000 census ===
As of the 2000 census, there were 1,283 people, 660 households, and 314 families residing in the city. The population density was 1,018.7 people per square mile (393.2/km^{2}). There were 1,155 housing units at an average density of 917.1 per square mile (353.9/km^{2}). The racial makeup of the city was 89.87% White, 0.08% African American, 1.09% Native American, 1.40% Asian, 1.56% from other races, and 6.00% from two or more races. Hispanic or Latino of any race were 4.83% of the population. 19.6% were of German, 11.5% Irish, 10.3% English, 6.3% American and 5.7% Norwegian ancestry according to Census 2000.

There were 660 households, out of which 17.0% had children under the age of 18 living with them, 34.2% were married couples living together, 11.8% had a female householder with no husband present, and 52.3% were non-families. 43.8% of all households were made up of individuals, and 20.5% had someone living alone who was 65 years of age or older. The average household size was 1.92 and the average family size was 2.63.

In the city, the population was spread out, with 17.6% under the age of 18, 5.8% from 18 to 24, 23.1% from 25 to 44, 28.9% from 45 to 64, and 24.5% who were 65 years of age or older. The median age was 47 years. For every 100 females, there were 81.2 males. For every 100 females age 18 and over, there were 77.9 males.

The median income for a household in the city was $23,611, and the median income for a family was $33,029. Males had a median income of $30,938 versus $20,625 for females. The per capita income for the city was $21,266. About 13.4% of families and 18.7% of the population were below the poverty line, including 19.5% of those under age 18 and 11.4% of those age 65 or over.

== Arts and culture ==
The Long Beach Razor Clam Festival has been held since 1940. During the event's first year, an 8 foot (2.4 m) wide frying pan used to make the world's largest omelet in 1933 was loaned to the city from Chehalis, Washington. The festival cooked a fritter containing 200 pounds (91 kg) of local clams. Long Beach forged a larger pan, the World's Largest Frying Pan, the next year, using it until the late 1940s where it was then displayed in the downtown district as a tourist attraction.

== Gallery ==
Crystal Baths, Long Beach, c. 1905, looking south towards Cape Disappointment (high land in background)

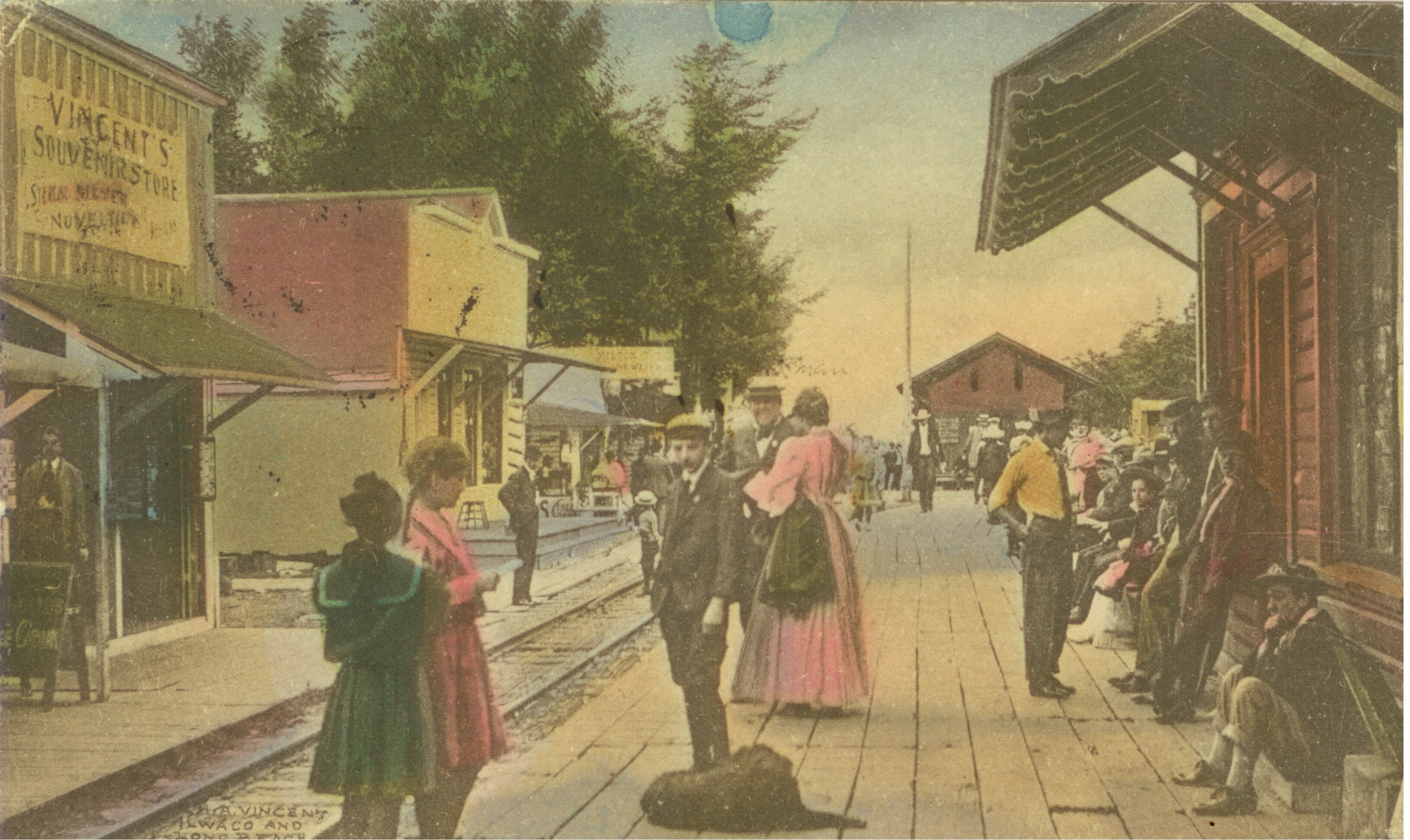
Long Beach, July 1909 "Rubberneck Row," looking north towards depot (building with 2 windows in distance just to right of telegraph pole)

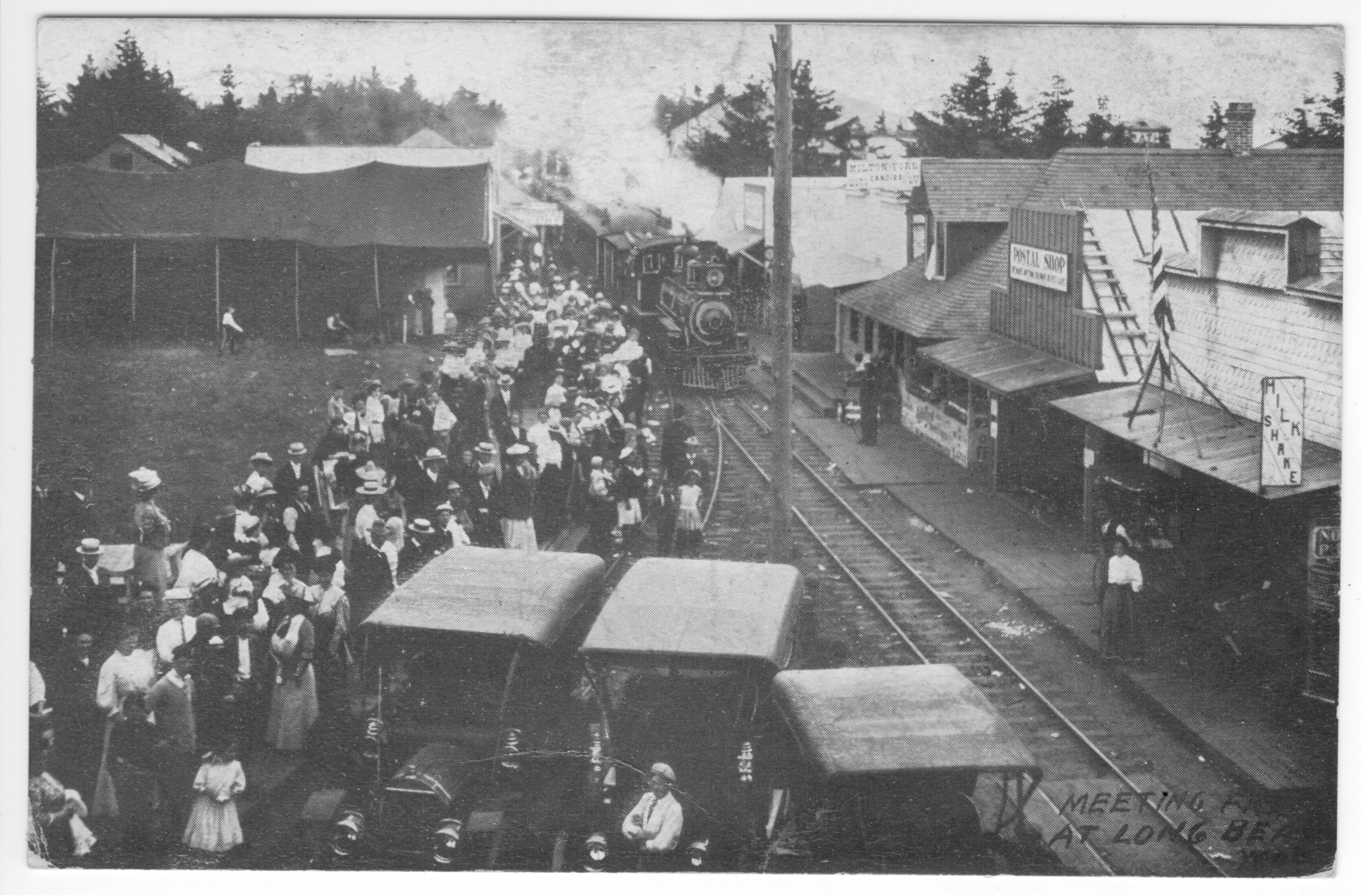
Waiting for train, Long Beach, August 1911, looking south, probably from depot window or roof

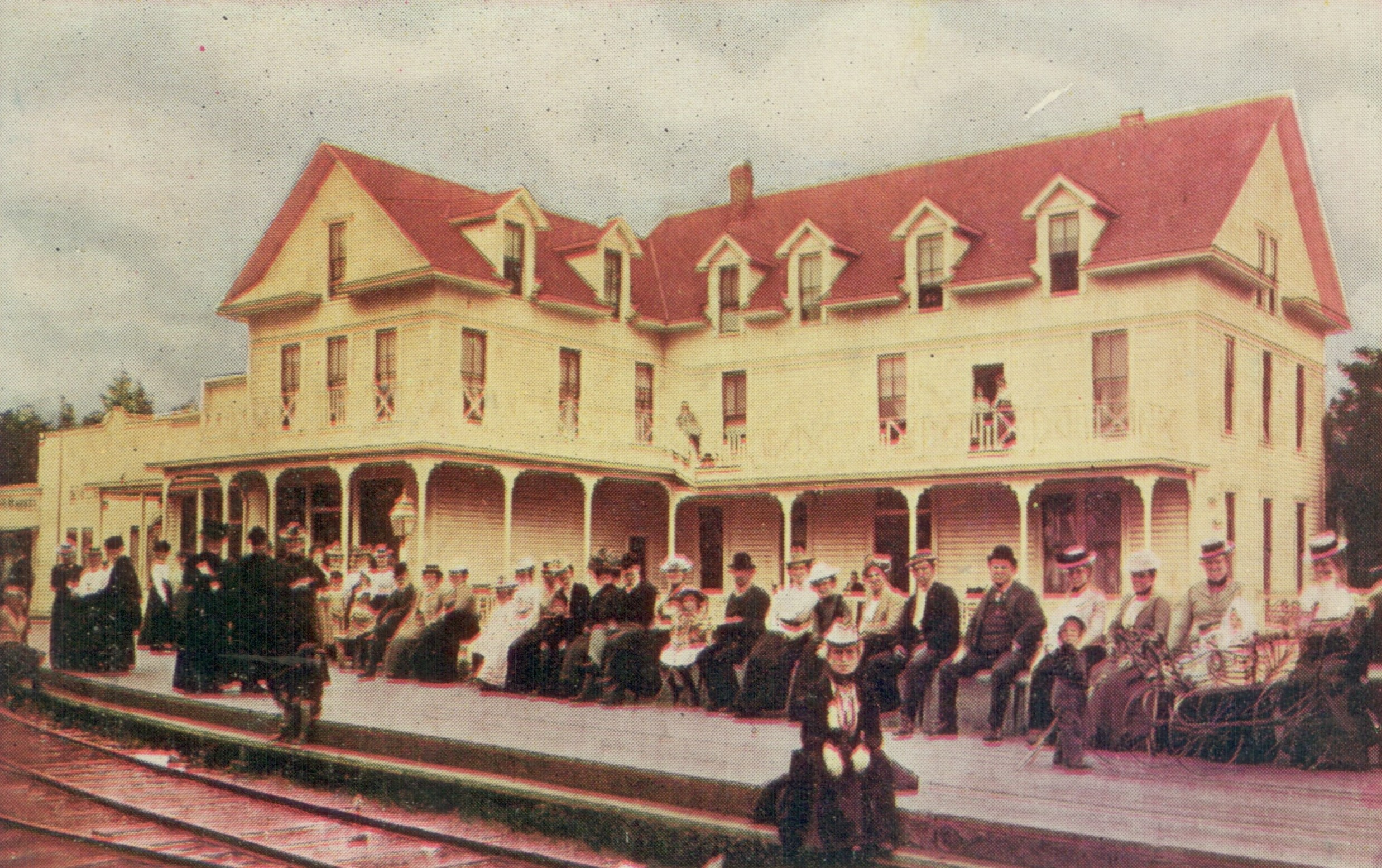
Tinker's Hotel, Long Beach, looking east

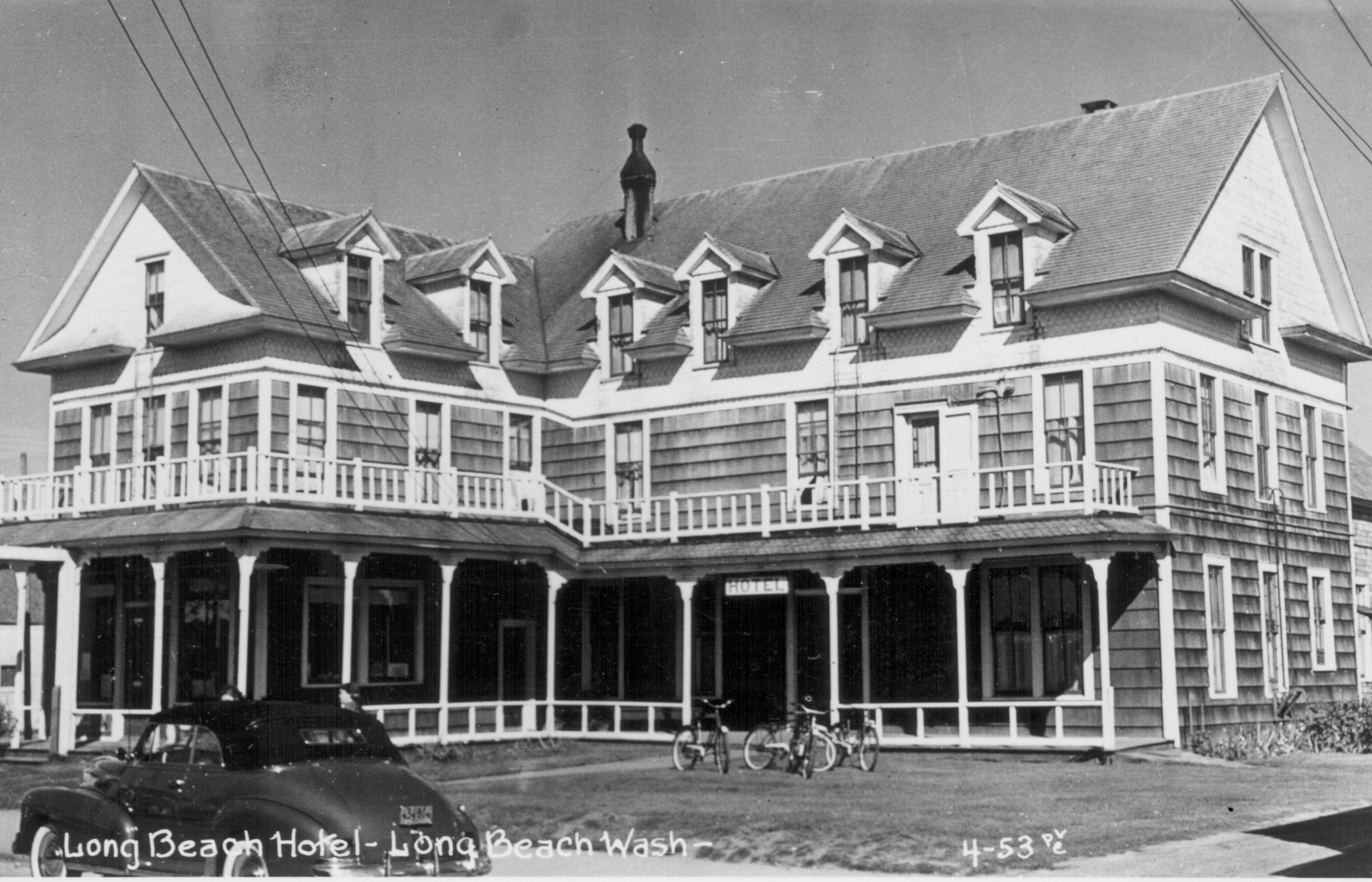
Long Beach (formerly Tinker's Hotel), April 1953

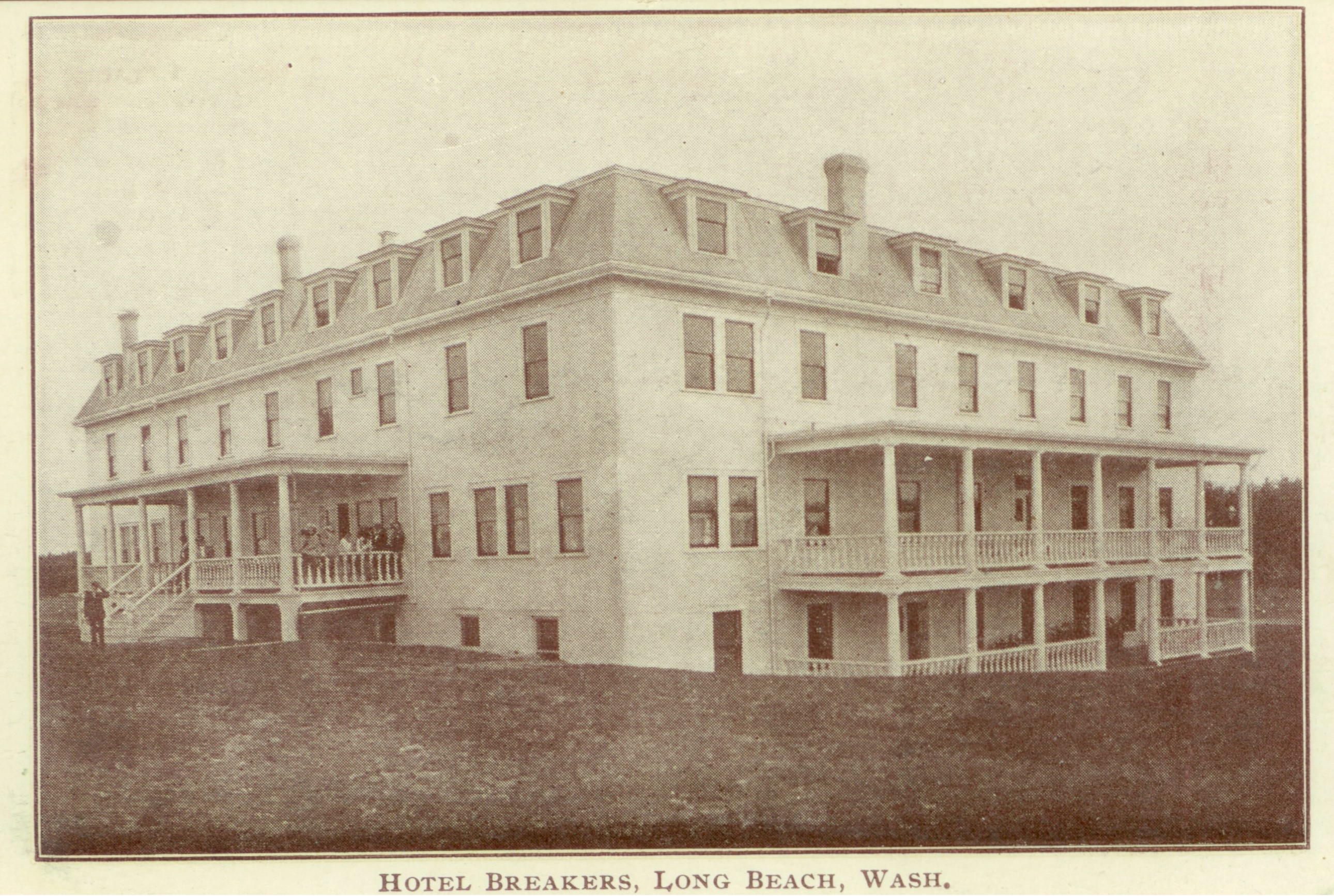
Breakers Hotel, Long Beach, looking east from beach

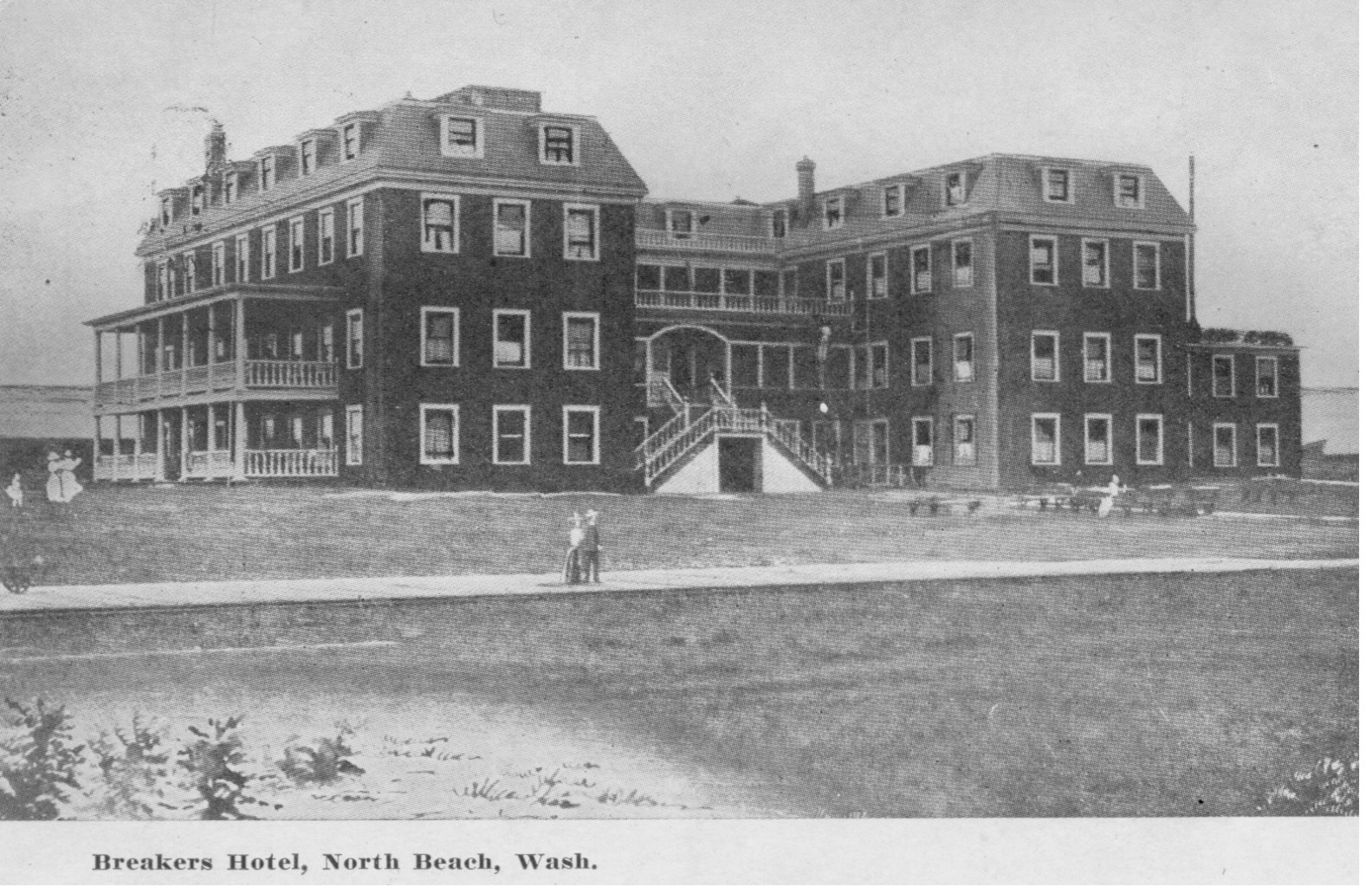
Breakers Hotel looking west

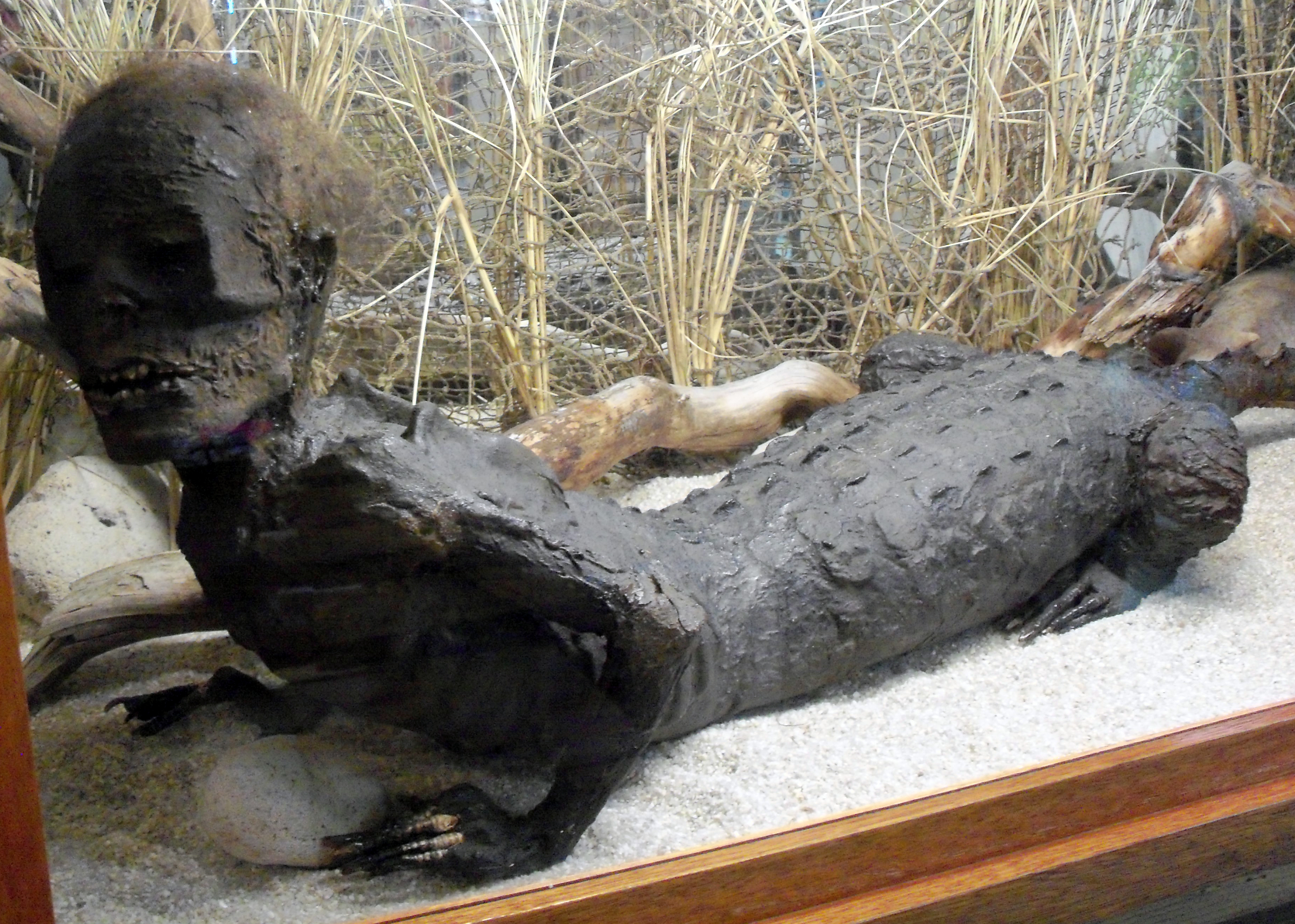
Jake the Alligator Man at Marsh's Free Museum in Long Beach

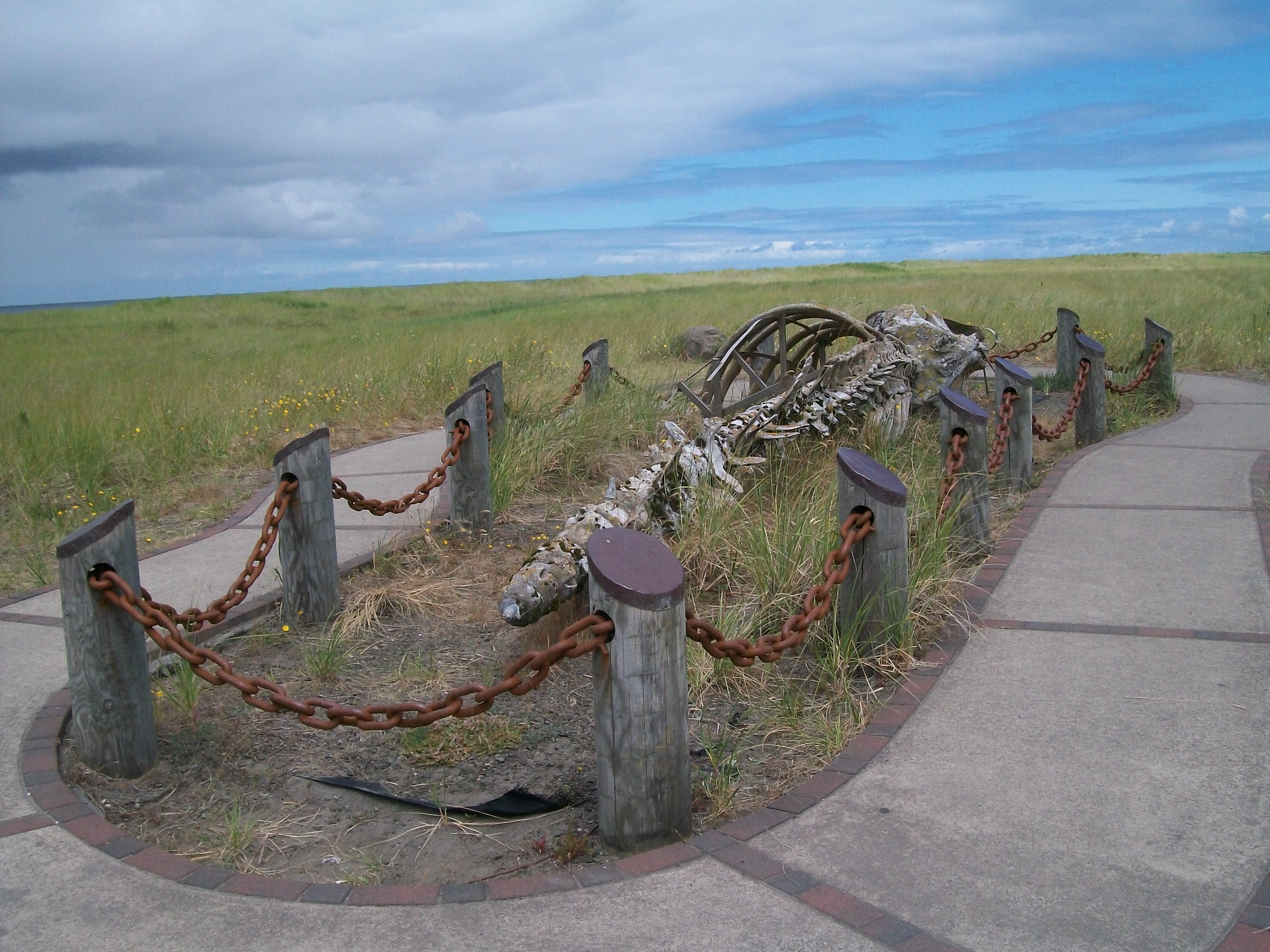
The whale skeleton on the Long Beach Trail

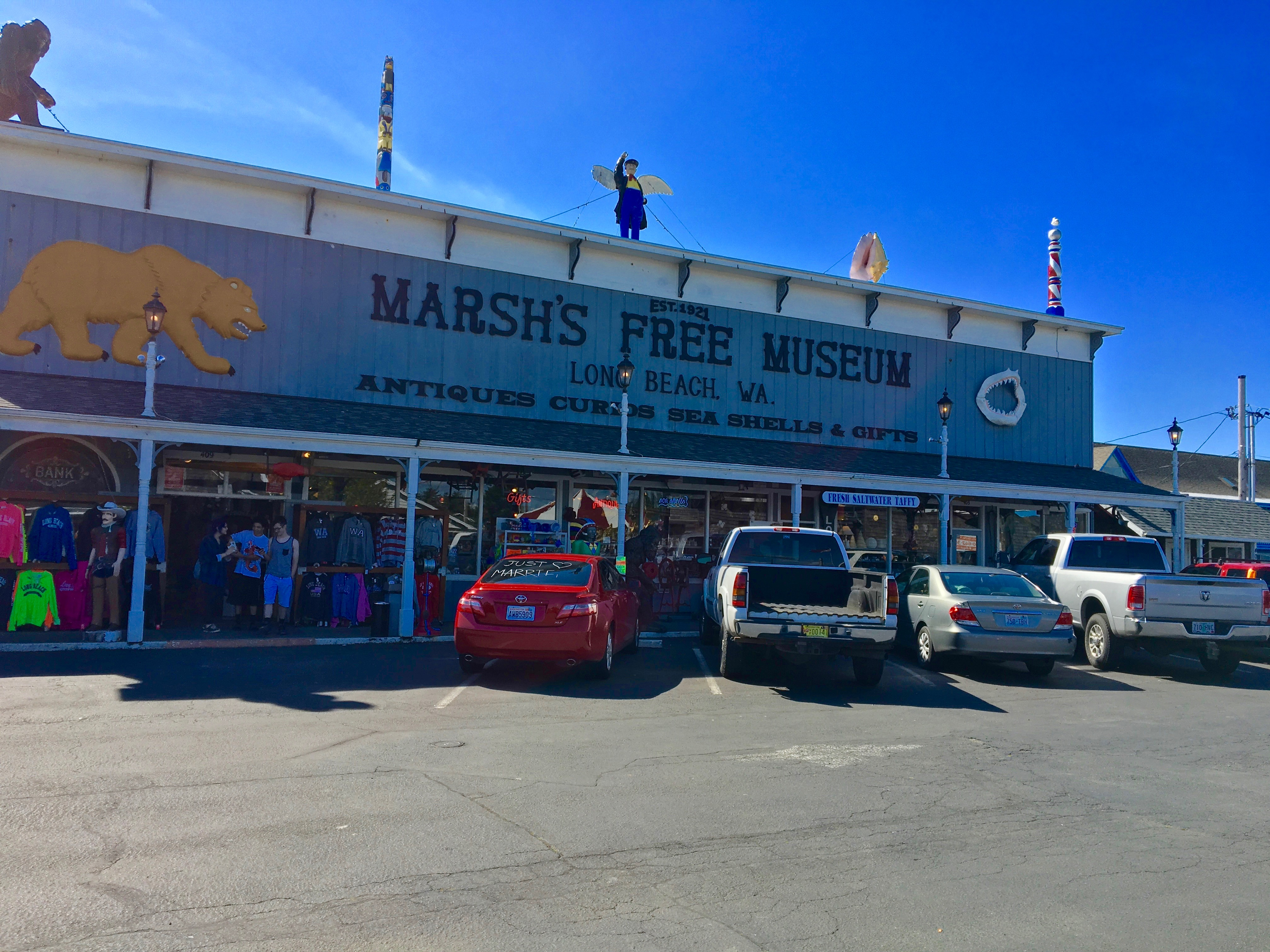
Marsh's Free Museum

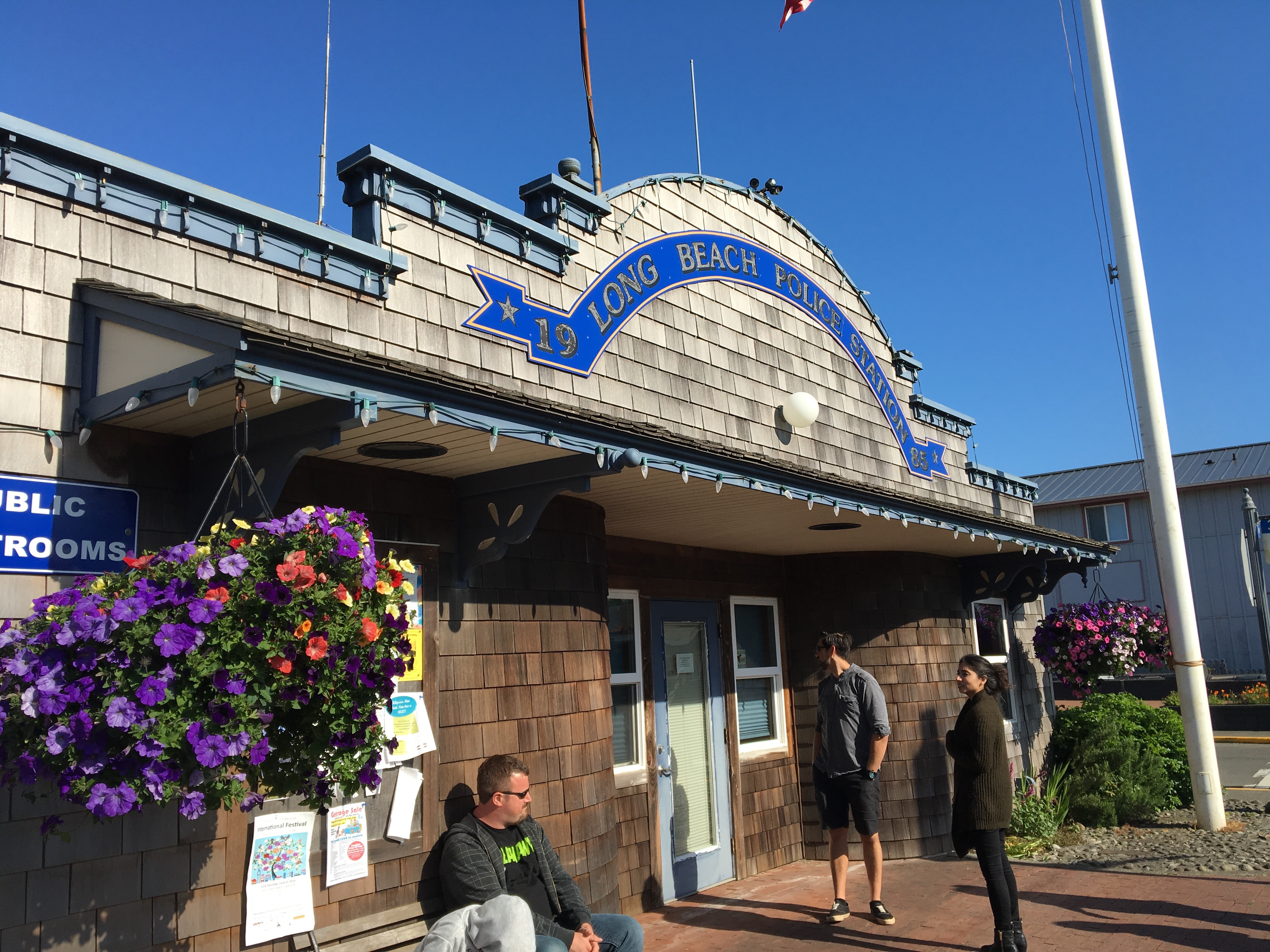
Long Beach police station

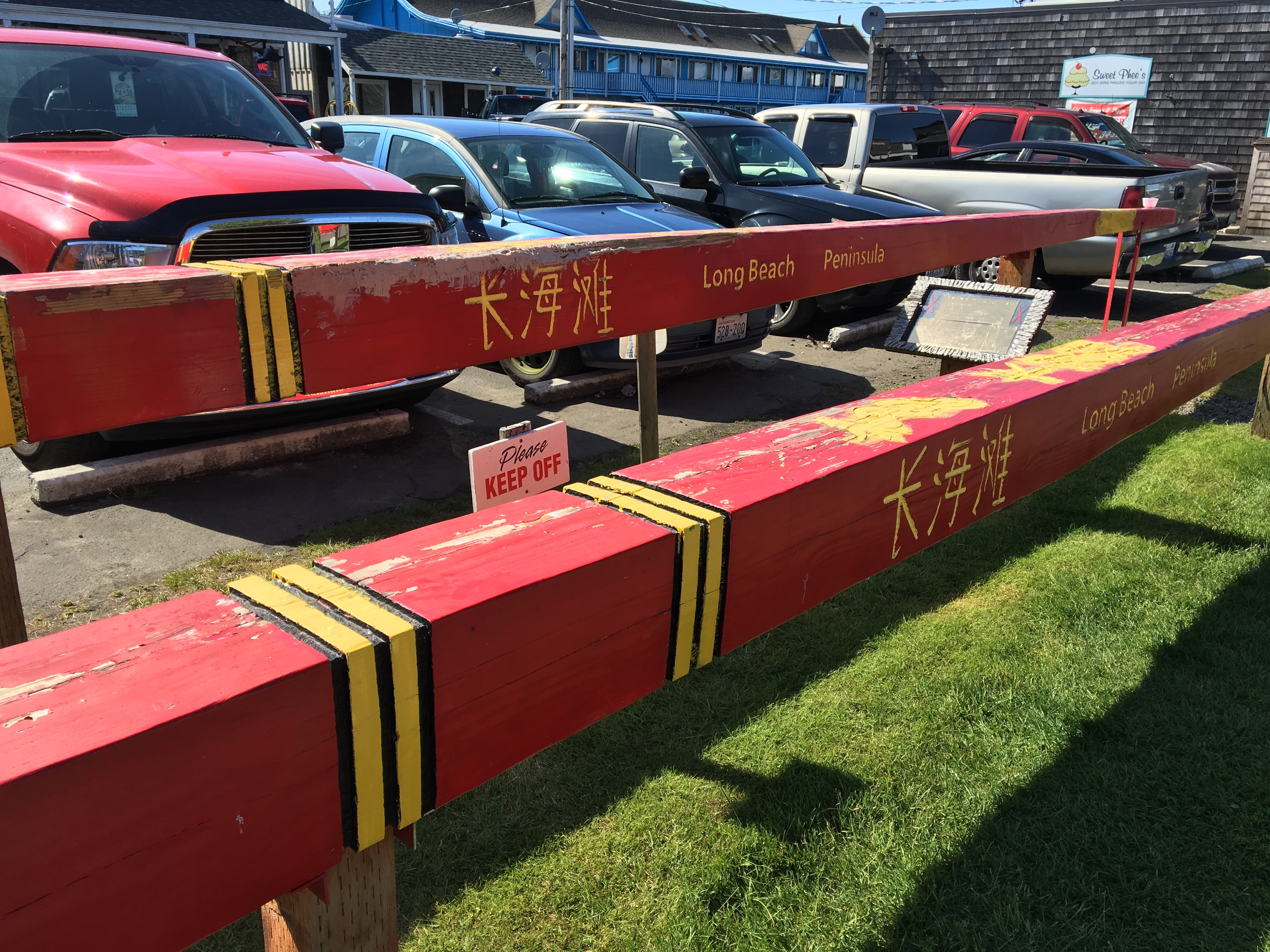
World's largest chopsticks

== See also ==
- Clark's Tree
- Washington State International Kite Festival
- KLMY
