= Petr Jakeš =

Czech geologist

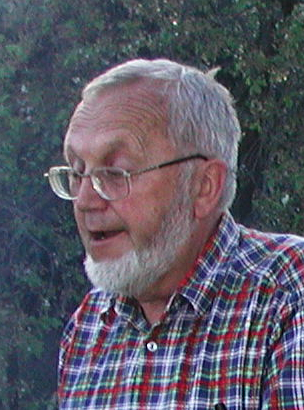
Petr Jakeš in 2003

Petr Jakeš (2 May 1940 in Břehy – 29 November 2005 in Prague) was a Czech geologist and geochemist. He dealt mainly with geochemical and volcanic processes on Earth and on celestial bodies, research on meteorites and lunar rocks.

Jakeš and his colleague Josip Kleczek co-authored the 1985 general reference book The Universe and Planet Earth; it was translated into English by Stephen Finn and published in North America and Europe in 1987 by Octopus Books.
