= Black Community School, Townsville =

Former school for Indigenous children in Townsville, Australia

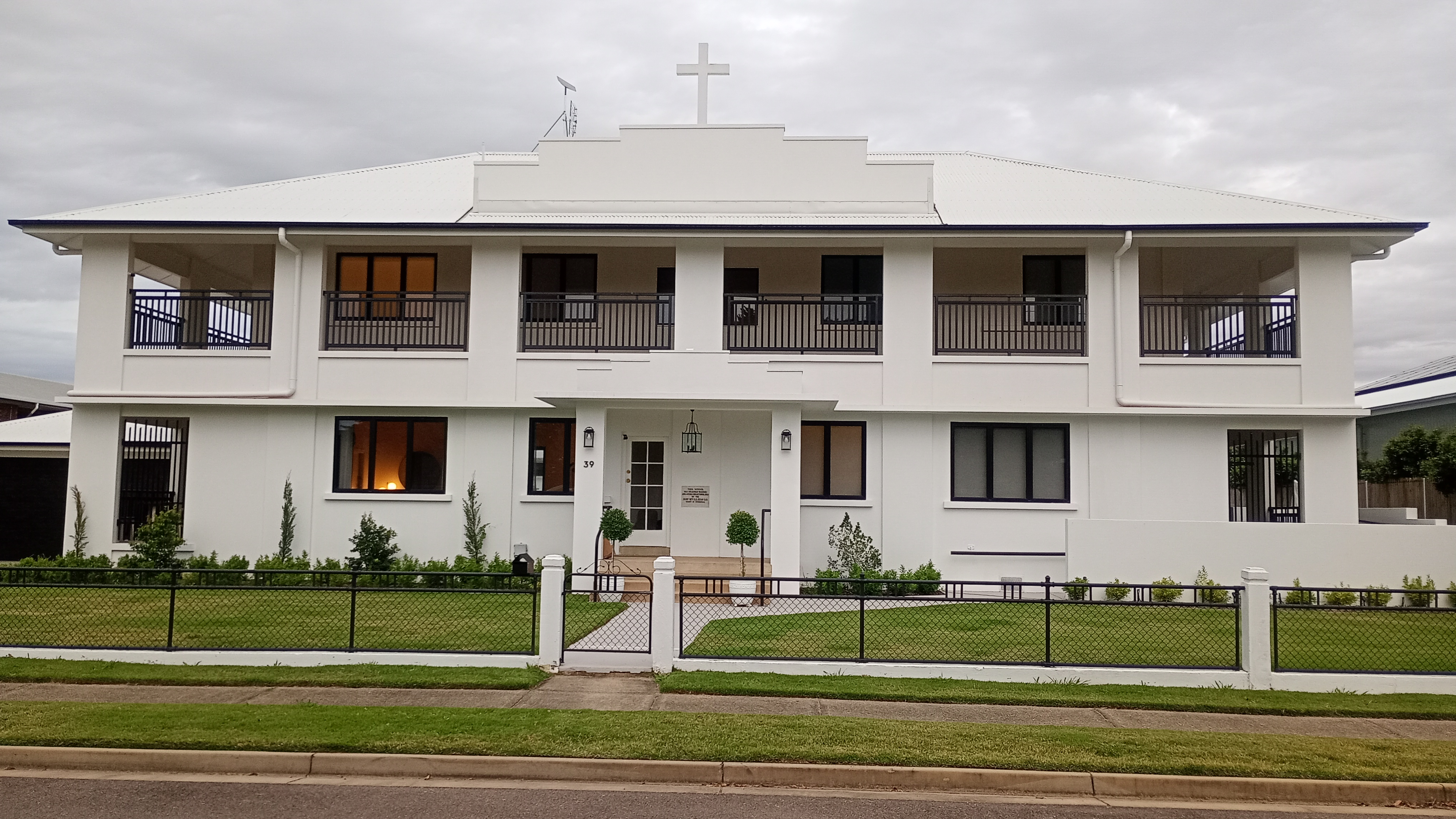
- St Patrick's Convent, the building in which the school operated, pictured in 2025 (now a private residence)

Location
- 41 Nelson Street; South Townsville, Queensland, Australia; 19°15′52″S 146°49′49″E

Information
- School type: Independent community school
- Established: September 1973
- Closed: 1985
- Principal: Eddie Koiki Mabo
- Years offered: Grade 3 – Grade 8 (initial intake)
- Enrolment: 45 (as of late 1970s)
- Website: Summary on mabonativetitle.com

The Black Community School (sometimes abbreviated to BCS) was a school founded in 1973 by land rights activist Eddie Koiki Mabo and his friend Burnum Burnum, in Townsville, Australia, for the education of local Aboriginal and Torres Strait Islander children. Established primarily as an alternative to the State education system, the school aimed to provide a program better suited to Indigenous children's needs, and which would better reflect their culture.

Mabo established the school, variously described as one of the first of its kind in Australia, or even the first of its kind in Australia, in order "to give black children an alternative education more suited to their needs", and that his own children could "share the songs and the language" of Mer, his home island in the Torres Strait, off the coast of Queensland.

According to the AIATSIS, the school was unpopular with the general Townsville community, and it was the target of criticism by the local Townsville Daily Bulletin newspaper as well as some local politicians. The state Minister for Education denounced the motives of the student's parents at the outset of the school in 1973, declaring the school as 'apartheid in reverse' and their attitudes as 'racist'.

Despite the initial pushback from the authorities, the school remained operating for a total of twelve years. The Black Community School eventually closed in 1985, ultimately due to lack of funding and the inability to secure a lease on a permanent site.

== Background ==
=== Schooling in colonial Australia ===
During the colonisation of Australia, Lachlan Macquarie (1762–1824), governor of the British colony of New South Wales from 1810 to 1821, wrote to Lord Bathurst in October 1814 suggesting an Aboriginal school be established in Parramatta (western Sydney) as part of "an endeavour to win the hearts and minds of the younger Aboriginal generation, and to persuade the parents to allow their children to learn some of the European ways". The school, named the Parramatta Native Institution, was opened in 1815 and operated for some time before parents soon started removing their children from it after it was felt its aim was to distance them from their culture and families. According to Wheatley,

While Maria (of the Booreeberongal clan) and the other Aboriginal children at the Institution were miserable about leaving home, the loss of these children was also terrible for their families. Two years later, in 1816, the mothers cried and beat their heads in distress when they saw their sons and daughters, all dressed up like white children, at the governor's annual blanket feast.

In 1872, Victoria became the first colony in Australia to pass legislation making education free, secular and compulsory. Following this, through the 1870s and 1880s, all Australian colonial governments passed laws making education compulsory for all children aged from six to twelve. In the following decades, schools of brick and stone were erected in urban areas, whereas "tiny schoolhouses of bark and timber sprouted in out-of-the-way places in the bush".

In these schools, boys were taught in history and geography, whereas girls followed an alternate curriculum in matters of humility and duty, "and were given practical instructions about how to run a household and sew a straight seam". Many private Catholic and Protestant schools continued to operate, with the former primarily catering to the children of poor Irish immigrants, and the fee-paying Protestant schools to the "offspring of wealthy industrialists and pastoralists".

=== Mabo's early life and move to Australia ===
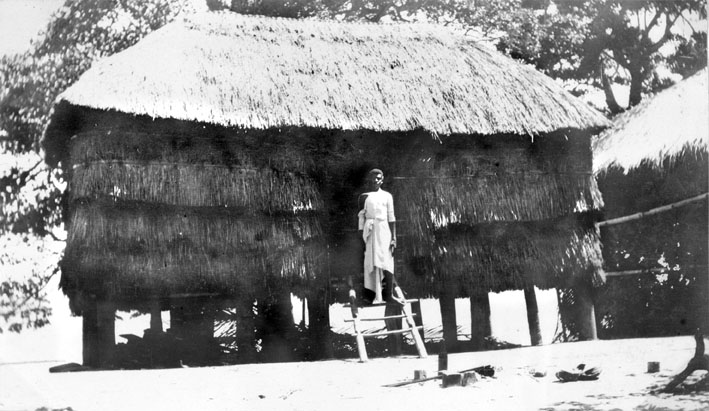
A native house on Mer Island, 1911

Edward (Eddie) Mabo, or Koiki as he preferred to be known, was born on Mer Island, part of the Torres Strait Islands, in 1936.

Mer had been under British control since 1879, when it was annexed by Queensland. The Islands were subsequently classified as being part of the British colony of Queensland and, after 1901, of the Australian state of Queensland, which they have remained. As described by Professor Noel Loos in Mabo's biography:

From 1871 permanent settlers from the London Missionary Society were posted on the Island. Not long after, the Torres Strait Islands became part of the pearlshell, bêche-de-mer and trochus shell fisheries, the Queensland Government having extended its border in 1872 and 1879 to control the industry. Throughout the twentieth century, the Queensland Government continued to segregate the Islanders from contact with mainland Australia under the policy of protection, while fostering the development of a cash economy based on the fisheries. The Islanders could sell only to the Government and were paid much less for their trochus and pearlshell. The crew's wages were also meagre in comparison with wages paid on boats owned by white businessmen.

In 1936, the year of Mabo's birth, 70% of the Torres Strait workforce was employed in the fisheries, providing half of the world's demand for pearl shells. The workers were bound under many racist restrictions enforced by a Queensland Government-appointed "Protector", such as not being paid wages proper, but rather paid in "credit that they had to spend in specified stores picked by the government". These restrictions culminated in the 1936 maritime strike by Torres Strait Islander workers which resulted in the government capitulating and making concessions to the strikers.

Mabo's schooling on the island was interrupted by World War Two, when the island's white administrators were evacuated to the Australian mainland city of Cairns for safety. Flotsam from the Battle of the Coral Sea (4-8 May 1942) in the form of American biscuits and powdered milk supplemented the islanders diet at a time when delivery of supplies from the Australian mainland was unreliable or non-existent due to the threat of enemy attack at sea. When the war ended, the white men returned to Mer, and formal education resumed. According to Australian writer Nadia Wheatley in her 2013 publication Australians All:

Eddie didn't enjoy school because the white teachers made him speak English instead of his traditional language, but after the war ended, a schoolteacher named Bob Miles arrived on the island. For Eddie, this was a real breakthrough, because Bob asked his pupil to help him learn the Meriam language, and in return, Bob helped the Meriam boy with his English. Eddie even went to live at the teacher's house when Maiga Mabo (his aunt and guardian) became sick, and later he would say that he was glad he'd had the opportunity to learn 'the whiteman way' as well as his traditional heritage.

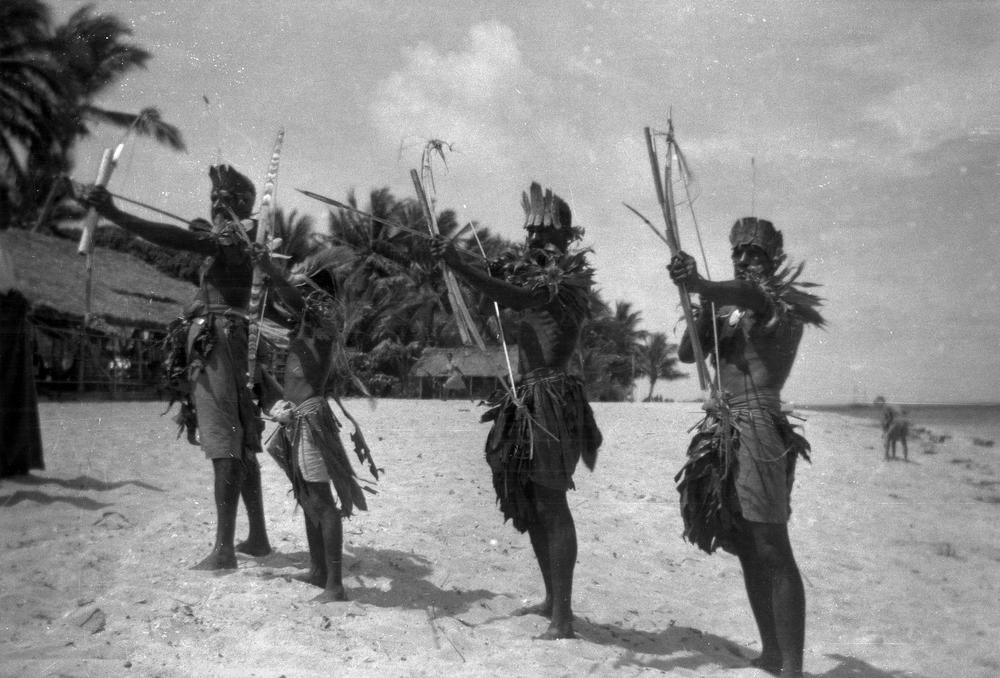
Murray Islanders in national dress, holding bows and arrows, 1960

In addition to a formal state education, Mabo's maternal uncle Benny gave Koiki a traditional education, who also guided his nephew through his first level of initiation. Mabo was instructed in the growing of yams and bananas, as well as "fishing secrets and special rituals associated with rebuilding the ancient fish traps that ringed the east coast of the island." Mabo's father was an ait, or Meriam leader, and Koiki would listen and remember conversations between islanders and his father regarding land disputes, and land ownership issues on the island. Years later, Mabo recalled a time in his youth when he was about fifteen years old, in which he spent:

...four weeks receiving instructions on the laws of Malo (hero-god of Torres Strait Islander people) and how they should be applied; about behaviour towards other males and towards women, how to tend gardens, the right season to plant and the signs to watch.

According to Mabo, the idea of the Black Community School came to him when he was 16. In conversation with Noel Loos, he recalled coming to Thursday Island (TI) and finding "kids there that spoke fluent English and (he) wasn't able to do so". Mabo imagined that if the school had been run by his parents then they would have gone to extremes to find "a right teacher and right equipment to be used in school to educate me". At the time of Mabo's first visit to TI, there was segregation in place between the schools of the black and white children; black children attending a school at a place called Ling's Camp, whereas white children were educated at another location called Green Hills. Mabo was told that the white school offered "much more in terms of the study of science, for example" whereas at the black school all they were taught was reading and writing. "We didn't even study our own history", Mabo recalled.

In the 1950s, men on the island of Mer had limited employment opportunities. They could stay in the Torres Strait Islands working on the pearlshell, beche de mer and trochus luggers, "for less pay than white Australians", or else aim for the "few government jobs, such as an untrained schoolteacher or storeman, which were also poorly paid." A more attractive option was to move to the Australian mainland where Islanders were entitled to draw equal wages to white Australians, even in low status, semi-skilled jobs, such as fettling in the railways or canecutting in the sugar cane industry of Queensland. In the late 1950s, the pearlshell and trochus industries which had sustained the economy of the Torres Strait Islands until that point began to collapse due to competition from newly developed plastics which could mimic nacre, and even more Torres Strait Islanders began to move to the mainland.

In either 1957 or 1958, in his early 20s, Mabo moved to Australia, in a "typically Torres Strait Islander experience... as a member of the Islander crew of a trochus lugger". Between 1958 and 1961, he became part of the small but growing Torres Strait Islander community in North Queensland and found employment on other luggers, cutting cane or working on the railway lines in the vast western region of Queensland. According to Noel Loos in his 1996 biography of Mabo entitled Edward Koiki Mabo. His Life and Struggle for Land Rights:

In the jobs he had since 1962, in his creation and administration of the Black Community School from 1973 to 1985, and in the ten-year struggle, from 1982 to 1992, that led to the recognition of native title (see Mabo v Queensland (No 2)), he was working in a world dominated as completely by white Australia as was the Island he had left as a teenager. And this world was enmeshed in alien codes, values and institutions that seemed, to Torres Strait Islanders, designed to disadvantage and humiliate them and to continue the dependence on white authority they had known in the Islands. Koiki Mabo never accepted white dominance or the inferiority and inferior status colonialist history attempted to impose on his people.

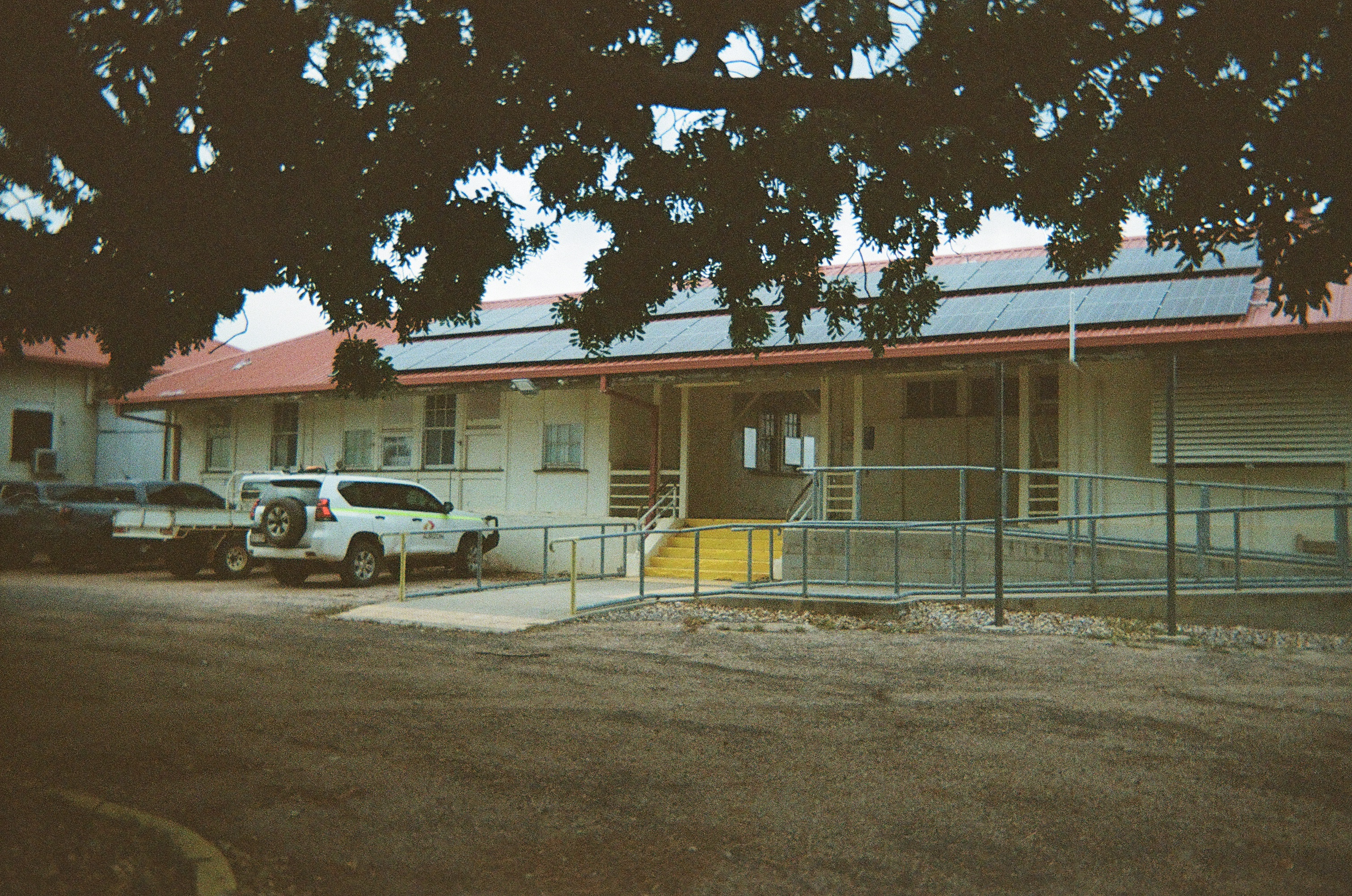
Hughenden railway station in 2025

In October 1959, Mabo married Bonita Neehow, an Australian-born South Sea Islander, and together they would have ten children. Mabo found work as a labourer with Queensland's state-run railway, his first assignment being 530km inland of Townsville at the maintenance depot of Hughenden, a rural town. Mabo became involved in North Queensland's trade union movement whilst working on the Queensland railways, and later as a labourer for the Townsville Harbour Board in Townsville, after himself and Bonita relocated there in 1960 in order to save money for a deposit on a house. According to historian Paul Turnbull:

Queensland's state-owned railways and harbours were active sites of working-class radicalism, in which local union branches established lending libraries and ran study groups in the conviction that through education, working men and women would be equipped to achieve better lives for themselves and their children. Union organisers, especially those associated with the Communist Party, readily supplied books, pamphlets and newspapers to workers on pastoral stations and other rural enterprises.

Turnbull believes that these aspects of unionism in North Queensland, and ethos of working-class activism, were what contributed to "sustaining and supporting" the Mabo's in their "commitment to Indigenous self-determination and faith in the liberatory power of education", expressed through their Black Community School endeavour. In 1962, Mabo became secretary for the Townsville branch of the Aboriginal Advancement League, a position he held until 1969, and in 1970 was elected President of the Council for the Rights of Indigenous People.

Mabo was often homesick for Mer, according to mabonativetitle.com, a website established by the National Film and Sound Archive of Australia in his memory: "He talked constantly about going back to his island. He was an accomplished amateur painter and when he felt homesick, he'd paint pictures of Mer. He'd also sing island songs around the house; anything that would remind him of his father, mother, family, or the island and culture he'd left behind."

=== Racial attitudes in Townsville of the 1960-70s ===
Professor Henry Reynolds, an Australian historian from Tasmania, and eventual personal friend of Mabo's, described the attitude to first nations people in Townsville when he first arrived in 1965 to begin a teaching career at the new University College (rechristened James Cook University in 1970):

I was asked to teach Australian history, which I knew very little about. I knew even less of the fraught relations between white Australians and the Aboriginal and Torres Strait Islander peoples. And it was a time of rapid change. Torres Strait Islanders had only been allowed to live on the Australian mainland for a few years, after having worked on rebuilding the Townsville-Mount Isa railway line. By 1966, many young men had brought wives and family members to live in Townsville and Cairns. At the same time there was what can only be called a reurbanisation of Aboriginal communities. Families were being allowed for the first time to leave hitherto closed reserves and missions. Others were being encouraged to walk away from pastoral stations in the vast hinterland as demands for equal pay grew louder. The 1967 referendum marked the beginning of a new era in community relations. In Townsville, the tensions accompanying rapid and radical social change were apparent every day and were, as a result, inescapable. And much of what one could see and hear was shocking. Old white Australia was resisting loudly and often violently. It was all totally new to me and in many ways unexpected. I was seeing aspects of Australia that I had known nothing about.

In his book Why Weren't We Told?, Reynolds recounts how "in Townsville, the local expert on racial questions was an old man who owned a private ethnographic museum", and was very well-regarded locally as he had once edited a leading anthropological journal in Sydney. Although believing that "full-blood" Aboriginals possessed "an integrity and nobility" of their own, the expert was of the opinion that "there could never be racial equality because Aborigines had much smaller brains than did Europeans" and were thus "biologically incapable of emulating the white race". Reynolds found that many townsfolk of Townsville shared the same beliefs, and on one occasion when Margaret Reynolds was involved in an art competition and approached a local primary school to see if there were any Aboriginal or Islander children who would like to take part, one young headmaster of a school with "a considerable number" of indigenous children was "quite enthusiastic", but:

...he did not expect much from them academically because they had smaller brains than European children. He spoke sympathetically, in confidence and with complete certainty.

According to Reynolds, people would use racist slurs unselfconsciously in the Townsville of the 1960s-70s "without concern about meeting disapproval from their listeners", and racist jokes were likewise popular and told and retold with minor variations amongst the white population. Reynolds notes that once Margaret and himself began to become known in the community as "pro-black zealots", people who recognised the pair at social events or on the street were "inclined to adopt contradictory courses of action" and "either went out of their way to avoid any reference to racial matters at all, or they took the opposite path and endeavoured to provoke us by telling the latest racist joke or relating the most recent fragment of urban folklore about Aboriginal privileges or delinquencies."

Reynolds notes that such ideas had been commonplace in Australian life at large until the 1940s or 1950s, and while such views could be easily labelled 'racist', they "did not necessarily lead people to act or speak with hostility towards indigenous people. Indeed, they often coexisted with sympathetic interest and a desire to lend a helping hand, inspired by the conviction that the Aborigines were a unique and special people who should be assisted in every possible way and whose culture was worthy of respect." Nevertheless, it was from within this social milieu that the Black Community School was formed, and goes some way towards explaining the hostility the school received in the press upon its formation.

Henry and Margaret Reynolds became outspoken supporters of Aboriginal and Torres Strait Islander matters during their time in Townsville, and publicly challenged the Townville Daily Bulletin on its initial reporting of the Black Community School, which they regarded as "opinionated, prejudiced and tendentious" in a letter to the editor dated 18 September 1973. In 1999, Reynolds reflected upon the era, and the mindset of himself and his wife at the time, critically evaluating it in hindsight:

Coming into a racially divided society with good and no doubt naive intentions towards the Aborigines, we went out of our way to display our lack of prejudice, our colourblind virtue. This often involved assuming a form of inverse racism - automatically taking the Aboriginal side in public debate, speaking not just of them but for them. It was no doubt a better way to proceed than being prejudiced against Aborigines and always assuming the worst of them. But it was prejudice none the less. It clouded judgement and led to special pleading, double standards and a measure of hypocrisy, although we didn't realise that at the time. Eventually, my experience undermined simple attitudes and ready-made answers. We met so many Aborigines and Islanders in so many different situations that generalisations became harder to articulate. It became obvious that there was almost as much variety and no greater virtue in the black community than there was in the white one.

In 1974, Eric Deeral became the first Aboriginal person elected to Queensland parliament (but only the second to be elected to an Australian parliament in general), indicating the changing attitude to racial mores.

=== Influx of Aboriginal and Torres Strait Islanders to Townsville ===
Mabo, delivering a lecture at James Cook University in 1982, recalled that when he and Bonita moved to Townsville in 1960 there were "only two Torres Strait families", whereas at the time of the lecture he noted there were "something like 8,000 of them (Torres Strait Islanders) running around".

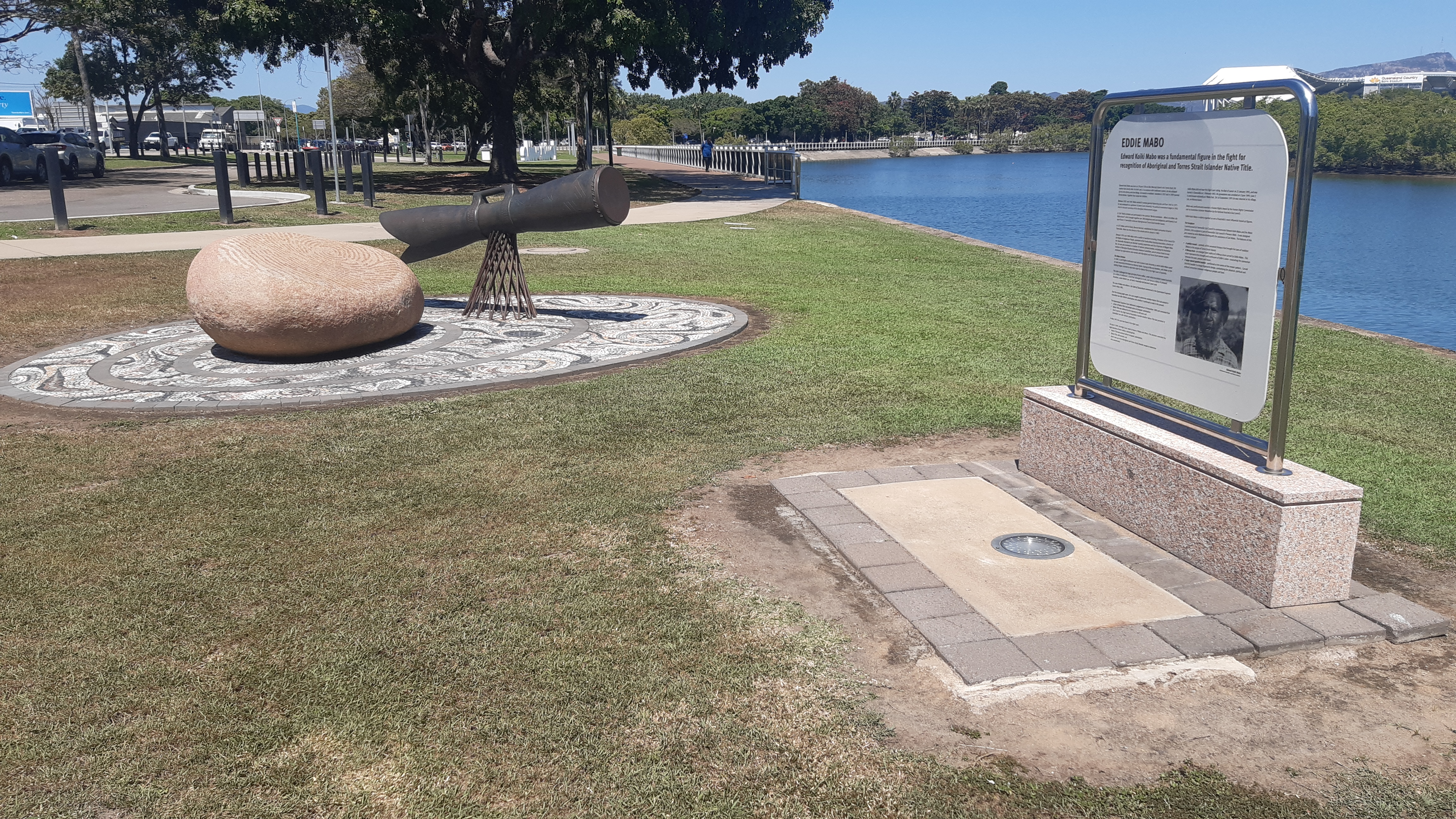
The Eddie Mabo Monument in Townsville, sited next to the Ross River, which incorporates a pebble mosaic, a boulder, a sculpture of a traditional warup drum, and an information board

Reynolds explains in Why Weren't We Told?, how "In the late 1960s Aborigines and Torres Strait Islanders were moving into Townsville in unprecedented numbers. It was a process of indigenous urbanisation that was at work all over Australia [..] Palm Island families began to settle permanently in Townsville (and) The Torres Strait Islanders who, as contract labourers, had rebuilt the Townsville - Mt Isa railway line in the early 1960s stayed behind to get jobs and began to bring their families to mainland Australia, initiating a process of chain migration which continues to this day." At the time of Reynolds and wife's move to Townsville, "Aborigines and Islanders were the only substantial and visible minority in a community that had received far fewer non-English-speaking migrants than the major urban centres", adding:

They made up to somewhere between 5 and 10 per cent of the population and were immediately noticeable. Numerous families shared large dilapidated wooden houses, in or near the central business district, which either blew down during Cyclone Althea in 1971 or were subsequently bulldozed to make way for office blocks or units [..] Ephemeral groups of Aborigines lived out in camps around the outskirts of the town in clumps of trees or bushes or in amongst the mangroves...

Reynolds acknowledged the benefits which moving to the city afforded many of these families, in terms of financial empowerment and the chance to receive a better education than they might otherwise have expected elsewhere:

In many cases the children of those who came to town in the 1960s seized the opportunities for education denied their parents. Government and Catholic schools had their deficiencies, but they offered a far better education than that provided on the reserves and missions. The children who grew up in Townsville were favoured by a much more supportive intellectual and cultural environment than their parents had known. The American civil rights movement, decolonisation of much of the world, and the contemporaneous emergence of a powerful local indigenous political movement all provided inspiration and motivation lacking in the 1930s and 1940s.

In September 1973, it was reported in the Townsville Daily Bulletin how filmmaker and journalist Cecil Holmes had recently told the Senate committee on the Social Environment that he believed Torres Straits Islanders were undergoing a kind of "quiet genocide", partly as a result of them "not reproducing and existing as a unit, in their natural and original environment". He added:

The problem arose mainly because the young men migrated in their hundreds to the (Australian) mainland. Some have drifted back for a while but the trend has been one of tending to remain away for longer and longer periods. Thus the spectacle of the Torres Straits Islands at this moment is one of fatherless children, deserted and destitute wives and an unnatural situation of women without men. It is a bitter and heartbreaking business produced by the fact that for a very long time those in authority have neither cared nor wanted to care about the fate of this ethnic unit.

On 5 September 1973, by accident coinciding (approximately) with the start date of the Black Community School, it was reported in the Townsville Daily Bulletin that Gordon Bryant, the Commonwealth Minister for Aboriginal Affairs, was sending a representative to Townsville that week to assess the requirements of Aboriginal and Island residents in the city. Senator Jim Keeffe, who announced the news, said Townsville had a "higher percentage of Island and Aboriginal residents than any other major city in Queensland". The article continued:

"Continuing representations have been made to the department for special treatment for the Townsville district" he (Keeffe) said. "The Minister has cooperated by arranging for a member of his personal staff to carry out a detailed investigation to ascertain priorities." The survey would cover housing, the establishment of a hostel, the setting up of a rehabilitation centre in a nearby country area, a cultural centre and employment needs. "The housing situation is probably the worst need as at least 250 homes are required. The city has never fully recovered from the devastation caused by Cyclone Althea and the situation has been aggravated since by the influx of people employed on the Greenvale nickel project and other development projects," Senator Keeffe said.

According to a piece in the Townsville Daily Bulletin dated 8 September 1973, there were "8,000 coloured people living in Townsville" at the time, of which 2,000 were adults. By 1981, it was quoted that Townsville had a population of 100,000 people (in total), including 5,000 Torres Strait Islanders, and 2,500 Aboriginal people.

By 1996, the year in which Mabo's biography was published, "two-thirds of the Torres Strait Islander people live(d) in mainland Australia, the single largest concentration being in Townsville."

=== Mabo's involvement in Indigenous rights ===
Mabo became involved in the 1967 Referendum campaign to have Aboriginal and Torres Strait Islander peoples included in the census for the first time, and to "allow the national Australian Government, rather than the state and territory governments, to make laws that affect Aboriginal and Torres Strait Islander peoples." For activists such as Mabo, the 1967 Referendum was a moment of "heady optimism", according to mabonativetitle.com. He initiated a conference in Townsville in December 1967 called the "Inter-Racial Seminar, We the Australians: What Is to Follow the Referendum?" and urged the conference to address issues of employment, housing, education, and broad ranging civil rights for Australia's indigenous people. The seminar involved 300 participants (120 according to Reynolds), both black and white, and received an intensely hostile reaction from the Townsville community.

According to Reynolds, the conference was proposed by key union officials who approached the mayor of Townsville to call a public meeting, which drew together a large and diverse committee including clergymen, academics, schoolteachers, small-businessmen, three Torres Strait Islanders and three communist union officials. The participation of the unionists was enough, according to Reynolds, to convince many people that the whole thing was a communist conspiracy to provoke racial conflict in the city.

In the 'Proceedings of the Inter-racial Seminar, 1967', the issue of aboriginal education was raised:

Training was also seen as a crucial factor in the search for employment. The inadequacy of the programmes on some church missions was cited. Attention was likewise directed towards school programmes. Serious discussion revolved around the question of motivating Aboriginal children to remain at school longer and to become qualified later for apprenticeships. It was agreed that preschool experience is a great advantage in giving the child an attitude of readiness for school, and should be encouraged. But more serious is the problem of the rather sudden break in school interest around Grade VII. A suggestion was made that the mothers form a group to discuss ways of interesting the child again, helping to provide a climate for study and at the same time engendering confidence." This however is only a part of the problem according to another group who contended that "the Aborigine who educates his son (or daughter) for a particular trade or position is very rarely able to place him in that work." Another group agreed and pointed to the consequences: "lack of opportunity in the white community stifles interest of coloured youths in obtaining adequate qualification. The drift to the stations is brought about not so much by desire as by disillusionment." The need therefore, if current and projected education enterprise is to effective, is for the removal of discrimination in employment - a reversal of the order of cause and effect normally cited"

In 1972, Mabo's father was dying from tuberculosis on the island of Mer, "a major killer of Torres Strait Islanders at the time", and Koiki planned a visit with his family. The family travelled to Thursday Island but were refused permission to travel onwards to Mer. As recounted by Bonita Mabo:

In those days you had to get permission to go across to Mer, but the Queensland authorities wouldn't let us. They said Eddie was a non-Islander, because he hadn't lived there for so long. They thought he was too political and would stir up trouble.

The family returned to Townsville, and six weeks later Mabo received a telegram to say that his father had died. Mabo's daughter Gail Mabo, then a child, recalls "My father cried. We never had the chance to meet our grandfather. My father never forgave the government authorities for this injustice. It fuelled his determination for recognition and equality in society. This began his ten-year battle for justice and political status."

=== Kindergarten Headstart (est. 1967) ===
Following the 1967 referendum, Koiki and Bonita "focused on enhancing educational opportunities for Aboriginal and Islander children." Together with Margaret Reynolds (wife of Henry Reynolds), the activist Roberta Sykes, and members of the One People of Australia League (OPAL), Koiki and Bonita became actively involved in what was "the first preschool for Aboriginal and Islander children in Queensland", named Kindergarten Headstart, and formed in Townsville in early 1967.

In his 1999 book Why Weren't We Told?, Henry Reynolds detailed his wife's involvement with the setting up of the project:

The most enduring aspect of our work with OPAL was the foundation of Kindergarten Headstart. Margaret taught intellectually disabled children in both Tasmania and London and had been head teacher of special schools in Devonport and within the state's major institution near New Norfolk. It was perhaps inevitable that she would attempt to provide indigenous children with preschool education and so bring her politics and profession together. At the time there was a strong focus on the need for compensatory education for children for minorities in the United States. The student organisation ABSCHOL organised home work classes for Aboriginal and Islander children and a local branch was active at the University College in Townsville.

Kindergarten Headstart began as the OPAL playgroup in a church hall near the centre of Townsville, with Margaret announcing her plans for the initiative in the local media, she "set up that first morning, laying out toys and educational games, but only a few children from nearby attended". Henry describes how it took further discussion with indigenous families and the organisation of transport to and from the church hall "to allay the very natural suspicion towards the project." The project soon began to grow, and within a year over 30 children were attending two days a week, "with Aboriginal and Islander women becoming directly involved either with the children or with the management committee." A team of voluntary drivers were formed, to bus the children to and from the church hall, and more families began to participate.

The difficulty in communicating the existence of the new service to local Aboriginal and Islander parents, owing to the deep distrust of white people harboured within the community, was explained by Reynolds with an anecdote:

Living in Townsville in daily contact with migloos (note: Queensland Aboriginal term for a European) was fraught with tension and anxiety for many (non-white) families, as we quickly learnt from our own experience. We called on many indigenous families soon after we arrived, to see if the children would like to attend a kindergarten Margaret had established. I remember several of these visits quite vividly. One morning I drove up to a large, old, run-down wooden house close to the central business district. I parked outside and without warning, notice or invitation opened the gate and walked along a narrow strip of concrete towards the front steps. A group of children playing in the yard stopped what they were doing, called out something about migloos and ran into the deep shade under the house and peered at me suspiciously from behind the wooden stumps (see: Queenslander architectural style). One child ran urgently up the back steps to tell the adults of my approach. When I climbed the front stairs and knocked on the door conversation inside stopped. After a brief period of silence there were rapid whispered exchanges. Eventually a man cautiously opened the door just wide enough to look out and see what I was doing there. He was extremely anxious. He was frightened of me. I might be a detective, or a government official or the landlord's agent. Why else would I be there? A white man wielded power. A white man meant trouble.

The Headstart project provided Aboriginal and Islander children with early education experiences and prepared them for primary school, as the children very often came from homes without toys or games or books. Furthermore, the project helped children with improving their English language skills prior to entry into the state school system, as "many Islander children spoke an indigenous language or Torres Strait Creole at home, while Aborigines used non-standard English."

Organisers of Kindergarten Headstart found funding a problem, and it was necessary to "put an enormous effort" into the organisation of door-knock appeals and mobilising large teams of collectors. Margaret Reynold's efforts were criticised by some in the Townsville community as discriminatory, questioning why she was prioritising the needs of some children above others, as recounted by Henry:

In Tasmania, Margaret had been highly successful in raising money from the service clubs for her special schools. Handicapped children always touched members' hearts and tapped their pockets. She expected to receive a similar response in Townsville, but indigenous children were another matter altogether. She spoke to local service clubs, explaining the purpose of her kindergarten in preparing children for school and thereby enhancing their chances of success later in life. But the members were hostile. In question time she was asked why Aboriginal and Islander children should receive special treatment. All Australian children, they said, should be treated the same. To do otherwise was to adopt the policies of apartheid. There were no friendly comments or supportive questions. She left the meeting deeply depressed and without money.

=== Impetus to create the Black Community School ===
In his working and living with Aboriginal Australians in northern Queensland, Mabo became "acutely aware" of their shared positions as "colonized peoples", according to political scientist Peter H. Russell, even though the spiritual beliefs, history and culture of Torres Strait Islanders were very different from those of the Indigenous people on the Australian continent.

Noel Loos, in his 1996 biography of Mabo, described one of the events that convinced Koiki of his need to create a school more suited to Aboriginal and Islander needs:

Mabo also attended seminars and conferences he considered relevant, entering confidently into the discussions. At one, the first conference on Aboriginal education held in North Queensland, he was so appalled at the comments being made by some of the teachers present that 'he did his dance.' He exploded into a physical and very vocal demonstration of his Islander identity as a rejection of the patronising and sometimes racist comments being made about Aboriginal and Islander children. As a result of this experience, Koiki Mabo, with his friend Burnum Burnum (Harry Penrith), established the Black Community School.

In his 2005 book Recognising Aboriginal Title, Peter H. Russell mentions the same event as that in Loos book, recounting that it occurred in 1973 at a training session for white teachers in schools with mostly Aboriginal and Torres Strait Islander students: "Eddie raised a storm. He thumped the floor, shouting, 'Who the hell's going to send their kids to be taught by racist people like these bastards?' In the energy and determination typical of Mabo, Russell writes, "within a few weeks" he had established the Black Community School "with some assistance from sympathetic university educators".

In describing the same event some years later, the National Aboriginal Education Committee recalled that it had been a conference involving teachers and Aboriginal/Islander parents of the area, and had been organised by a lecturer from Townsville C.A.E. (College of Advanced Education), designed to investigate the attitudes of the schools and school teachers to Aboriginal/Islander children. The general outcome of the conference, according to the NAEC, was that "many of the Aboriginal/Islander parents felt that education for their children was being hindered by the negative attitudes expressed at the conference by teaching staff of local schools", and, because of this, several parents decided that alternative arrangements in education should be made.

Henry Reynolds described in 1999 his first hearing of plans for what would become the Black Community School:

We experienced similar reactions a few years later when our friends Harry Penrith (subsequently known as Burnum Burnum) and Eddie Mabo decided to set up the Black Community School. We heard about the project one night when Harry came rushing in to our place. That was not unusual. He was constantly dropping in to report some new venture or enthusiasm for a political campaign, a reform initiative or a business venture. But this night his excitement was about education. He announced that he and Eddie had decided to establish a community school for indigenous children and they wanted our approval and support, which we readily gave. I had known for some years that Eddie was unhappy with the education his children were receiving. They had been among the first pupils of Kindergarten Headstart and while they performed well when they went on to primary school, he believed that, like other Murray Island children raised in Townsville, they were losing their language and cultural traditions.

In conversation with Noel Loos, Mabo explained that he got the school "off the ground" with the help of Harry Penrith, adding that "He (Penrith) put it all together".

The primary schools at the time were "totally monocultural in emphasis and assimilationist in practice" according to Reynolds, and Mabo was "deeply exercised" about the potential threat of his culture disappearing within a generation. To counteract this, Mabo held observances of Island religions and seasonal festivals in Townsville, one of which, Henry Reynolds officially opened as a favour - an "elaborate festival in a churchyard in South Townsville". Burnum's enthusiasm came from his having been raised in an orphanage, where he had not been afforded the chance to learn his native language or be involved in his cultural traditions, of which he "keenly felt the loss".

Lecturing at James Cook University on one occasion, Mabo discussed what had made him want to start the Black Community School: "I think what emotionally forced me to think along these lines more strongly was the fact that my kids keep coming home with tears in their eyes you know, complaining what sort of treatment they've been getting in other schools."

According to the webpage mabonativetitle.com, "Mabo's vision for the school was to bring together the best of two cultures. European education, skills and ideas would be taught alongside traditional Aboriginal and Islander culture. It was a courageous vision, relying on his belief that, combined, the two cultures would produce confident and articulate students. Mabo believed this sharing of cultures would create a unique opportunity for multiculturalism in Australia."

=== Sympathetic policies of Whitlam government ===
Following the election of Gough Whitlam and his reformist Labour party government to power in 1972, "new possibilities arose" for Koiki and Bonita in realising their ambitions for Aboriginal and Islander children, and matters of how best they might be educated. The Whitlam government adopted policies of acknowledging Indigenous rights of self-determination as well as addressing what Turnbull noted as "the long-overdue issue of land rights", including a significant piece of legislation passed in 1975 (Racial Discrimination Act 1975) which ended discriminatory treatment of Indigenous people.

The Queensland state government initially opposed the Act, with the result that the Whitlam government "legally extinguished the powers of the Queensland state government to restrict rights of Aboriginal people and Islanders in respect of property and working conditions."

== History ==
=== Beginnings ===
The support for educational programs for Indigenous children demonstrated by the Whitlam government inspired Koiki, Bonita and other community elders to establish "a community-run school for Aboriginal and Islander primary school students" in Townsville.

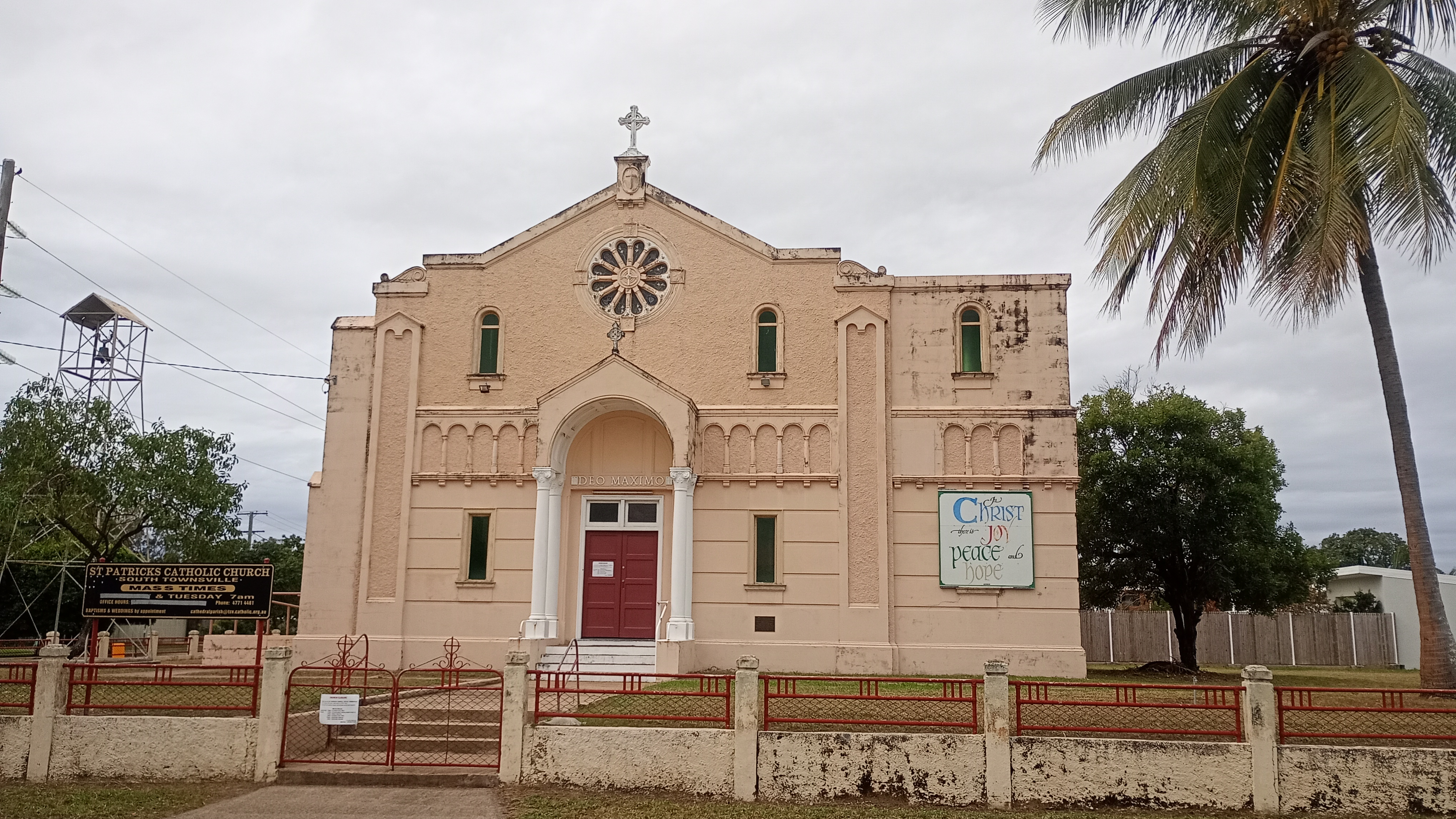
St Patrick's Catholic Church, South Townsville, pictured in July 2025 (disused), behind which the school operated

The Black Community School opened on the ground floor of what used to be St Patrick's Convent, at the rear of St Patrick's Catholic Church, on Nelson Street in the suburb of South Townsville in September 1973. The building as well as the surrounding playground were leased from the Catholic Church for the sum of $4,000 per annum, this figure having been agreed beforehand by solicitors of both parties.

It was initially funded with modest financial support from the Townsville Diocese of the Catholic Church, the Townsville Trades and Labour Council (owing to Koiki's contacts there), and the James Cook University branch of the Australian Union of Students (AUS). Additional funding came from parents of the children themselves, the Australian Council of Churches and the Aboriginal Arts Board. Later, the Schools Commission, the Aboriginal Arts Board and the Department of Aboriginal Affairs provided funds.

Staffing was provided by two teachers, who, disenchanted with the approach to indigenous education within the Queensland State Education system, volunteered to work for half pay to help establish the school. Koiki himself also volunteered to work for half pay to help establish the school, becoming the director of the school, president of the Parents' Council, and also executive officer "because of the turnover of the teachers". Bonita Mabo worked as a teacher's aide and craft teacher.

At its outset, the school aimed to provide for children late in their primary schooling because parents recognised this as the most critical stage, however, by January 1975, it was realized that it was "too difficult to finance the extensive resources required at secondary level". Therefore the school amended its original aim and, as of a source from August 1977, operated to provide the best possible early education up to secondary level, by which time it was hoped successful transfer could take place (between children graduating from the BCS to state run secondary schools).

According to the Eddie Koiki Mabo entry on the Australian Institute of Aboriginal and Torres Strait Islander Studies webpage, "The school started with ten students in an old Catholic school building in the heart of inner city Townsville.

=== School committee ===
The original committee for the Black Community School was convened after a public meeting attended mainly by Torres Strait Islanders, with Islanders "apparently show(ing) more interest in the school than Aborigines". Only one Aboriginal person, "the original instigator", was a member of the initial committee, however when he left Townsville he was not replaced by another Aboriginal person. The committee, consisting of parents of children of the school, agreed that Koiki Mabo should be in charge of the school as Director.

=== Townsville Daily Bulletin reportage ===
According to Mabo's biography, he had been regarded with hostility by members of the white Australian community on a number of occasions, but usually "rode out the opposition". This was "especially the case" when it came to the creation of the Black Community School.

The front pages of the Townsville Daily Bulletin for the week starting Monday 3 September 1973 focused on an ongoing cholera outbreak in Naples, Italy which had by then claimed the lives of nine people. The first mention of the Black Community School in the paper was on 14 September 1973 in an article entitled 'Doubts Surround Legality Of New Community School.' (Note: The Townsville Daily Bulletin. 14 September 1973. Page 11. Doubts Surround Legality of New Community School. A new school, catering exclusively for primary school children of Aboriginal and Torres Strait Islands residents of Townsville, was opened in South Townsville on Monday, September 3. Known as "The Black Community School", it has reportedly been established in an endeavour to seek alternatives which would help to "increase and maintain black confidence." But education authorities said yesterday that the school has neither standing nor status, is not recognised by the Education Department of Queensland, and has been opened and tuition commenced before its promoters have complied with the necessary preliminary formalities laid down by the Education Act, 1964-70. The aims of the school are set out in a roneoed circular at present being distributed in Townsville. Dated August 28, 1973, and signed by a prominent member of Townsville's Aboriginal community, the circular spells out the aims of the new school as: (i) To give black children an alternative education more suited to their needs, (ii) To involve children's parents and the community in these children's education, (iii) To provide a satisfactory climate for the tuition of children who are academically orientated and motivated towards eventual tertiary education, (iv) To be a focus around which the black community can operate. "FAILED MISERABLY". The circular claims that the Black Community School has been created by "a group of black people who have come together with the common realisation that the educational system of Queensland has failed miserably, if success is measured by educational attainments and achievements of black people. We feel that teachers have done a magnificent job in perpetuating traditional retardation of black children through the normal school processes, and unfortunately for us, the scourge of racism continues to haunt the school classroom. It seems that our teachers have not been made conscious of the degree to which they reflect the prejudices current in society and as a result, they have not been encouraged to avoid these prejudices. The whole society is culpable. It is logical, therefore, that for us to seek alternatives which are going to maintain and increase black confidence. We are convinced that given the right environment in a situation where we can employ teachers of our choice, where for a particular part of their education, our children can be taught traditional pursuits in dancing, singing, cooking, fishing, hunting, etc., as well as 'normal subjects,' then we know they will respond. Our school will initially comprise a total of 10 pupils covering grades 3 to 8. The emotional security of being together during this vital stage and the advantage of three experienced teachers to give continuous personal tuition to each child will permit them to flow back into the State High School education system, better suited to cope with highly motivated classmates in their first real encounter with competitive society." FINANCE. The embryo board of the new Black Community School admits to "a big problem at present" in the matter of finance to cover the salaries of teachers and "the acquisition of furniture and other materials," and is initially relying on Abschol for financial support. Claims that some funds were being provided by members of the Students' Union of James Cook University were discounted yesterday when a member of the union said that any money being provided would come from a grant being made by the Melbourne office of Abschol, to cover the cost of the teachers' salaries for the first term at least. Students of James Cook University, he added, were not involved in any way with the Black Community School. It was learned from an authoritative source, however, that one part-time and two full-time teachers had agreed to offer their services to the school and work at 50 per cent of normal salary rates. RECOGNITION. In a bid for recognition, the circular claims that "the Minister for Education has been requested to recognise our school as being bona fide, as well as satisfying him of the compulsory attendance clause." Section 28 of the Education Act 1964-70 stipulates that "every parent of a child being of the age of compulsory attendance shall, unless some reasonable excuse exists, cause such child to attend a State School on each school day." A "reasonable excuse" is defined in Section 30 of the Act as meaning that "the child concerned is receiving instruction in some other manner which in the opinion of the Minister is efficient." Senior officers of the State Education Department in Townsville declined to comment yesterday on the newly-launched Black Community School. But education authorities in Brisbane described the school as being "without either status or standing and a breach of the Education Act." They added that parents of primary school children, who previously attended State schools in South Townsville, but had now been enrolled at the Black Community School, had actually breached the Act and were liable to prosecution. In addition, people attempting to entice children away from a State primary school and enrol them in an unauthorised school not recognised by the State Education Department were also technically guilty of an offence and risked legal proceedings being instituted against them. Speaking by telephone from Brisbane, the Minister for Education, Sir Alan Fletcher, said that up to the present time no application had been received by his department for the setting up of another school in Townsville. If, he added, the Black Community School had already been established without his authority and in anticipation of his prior approval, then it was "outside the Act, and its principals were not legally entitled to do this." The Minister pointed out that before a special school could be established, its promoters "were obliged to comply with certain requirements which had not been fulfilled in this instance. This is the first I have heard of the Black Community School in Townsville" Sir Alan said, "and all I can say at this juncture is that it is most unlikely I would approve of a school based on such highly provocative and emotional principles. If our education system has failed, then we should be shown where it has failed" he added. "Such a segregated approach is not likely to improve the situation at all, and I certainly do not approve of this move." RACISM. Prominent Aboriginal and Torres Strait Islanders residents of Townsville have denounced the Black Community School as "apartheid, discrimination in reverse and the worst form of racism yet." Mrs. Thelma MacEvoy, of [number redacted] Hughes Street, Hermit Park, is the assistant secretary of the Aboriginal Advancement League, and a member of the Legal Aid and Border Action Committees. She has four children, aged between 7 and 15, who attend either the Hermit Park State Primary School or Town High. "I would not like to see any of my children at the Black Community School" she said yesterday. "I do not think it is a good thing to have a special school just for black children... because this was the very thing we fought against for years at Palm Island. Integration, not segregation, was what we wanted, for how could children brought up in a black school adapt themselves to a white environment?" she asked. All the children of Mrs. Eva Geta, of [number redacted] Clayton Street, Hermit Park, are either still at school or "wound up at Town High." "I am quite happy with the type of education they get", she added. "We left Palm Island years ago to get away from segregation over there, because I do not agree with children being segregated just because of the colour of their skins." Her daughter, 22-year-old Josephine, who reached Junior level at Town High, does not agree that there is any need for a Black Community School in Townsville. "There is not even such a thing as a black community", she said, adding that as a result of her schooldays, she has "far more white friends than coloured, and there is no sense at all in wanting to separate black kids from white." One youngster who "had enough on the first day," and is jokingly referred to as "the Black Community School's first past pupil," is 11-year-old Alfred Clay, son of Mr. Fred Clay, chairman of the Palm Island Community Council. He refused bluntly to go back on the grounds that "they were all mud kids over there." ("Mud people" is the name by which Aborigines in this area refer to those from the Islands, while the Islanders call the Aborigines "Murrays"). And as Mrs. MacEvoy pointed out, how could children segregated in a black school "ever hope to reach the same level of education as Aboriginal men such as Michael Miller in Cairns and Philip Stewart in Proserpine, both of whom are qualified teachers in the Education Department, employed teaching both black and white kids in Queensland State schools?" One well-known Aborigine who occupies a senior position in a Government department in Townsville put forward an alternative to the Black Community School. "White kids want to know more about my people," he said. "So why not get over this whole thing simply by setting aside one of two periods each week for the compulsory study of Aboriginal history and culture in all grades in all primary schools?" NEW APPROACH. That the Commonwealth Government has already taken steps to combat inequality in educational opportunity is the programme to be financed on the recommendations of the Karmel Committee. Writing in the August 1973 issue of the Queensland Teachers Journal, the president of the union, Mr. R. H. Costello said: "It is well to note that programmes for disadvantaged schools have inherent in them a break with a long tradition in Australian education. That tradition is that all schools are entitled to equal material provision, at least in those inputs provided by the Government. The Compensatory Education approach is that one should provide superior standards of staffing, facilities and equipment for disadvantaged schools to compensate for an impoverished home environment. Teachers will need to be convinced that it is an objective assessment of environmental disadvantages, which entitles a school to additional assistance, and not the political influence of the local Member of Parliament. The Education Department and the union have been discussing this question in a co-operative way, for it is important for both organisations than an objective and educationally sound basis be established from the beginning for this programme. The task of compensating for the disadvantages suffered by children who come from a culturally or economically deprived home is both complex and relatively uncertain. There is little in the record of educational endeavour which suggests that the school could hope to be totally successful in compensating for a deprived home environment, and this is the educational challenge facing many of our teachers in future years.") In the article, it claimed that "a new school, catering exclusively for primary school children of Aboriginal and Torres Strait Islands residents of Townsville, was opened in South Townsville on Monday, September 3" (Mabo later claimed this date was incorrect), continuing:

Known as "The Black Community School", it has reportedly been established in an endeavour to seek alternatives which would help to "increase and maintain black confidence."

The article stated that "education authorities said yesterday (13 September) that the school has neither standing nor status, is not recognised by the Education Department of Queensland, and has been opened and tuition commenced before its promoters have complied with the necessary preliminary formalities laid down by the Education Act, 1964-70." The article continued that:

The aims of the school are set out in a roneoed circular at present being distributed in Townsville. Dated August 28, 1973, and signed by a prominent member of Townsville's Aboriginal community, the circular spells out the aims of the new school as:
(i) To give black children an alternative education more suited to their needs,
(ii) To involve children's parents and the community in these children's education,
(iii) To provide a satisfactory climate for the tuition of children who are academically orientated and motivated towards eventual tertiary education,
(iv) To be a focus around which the black community can operate.

The circular claims that the Black Community School has been created by "a group of black people who have come together with the common realisation that the educational system of Queensland has failed miserably, if success is measured by educational attainments and achievements of black people. We feel that teachers have done a magnificent job in perpetuating traditional retardation of black children through the normal school processes, and unfortunately for us, the scourge of racism continues to haunt the school classroom. It seems that our teachers have not been made conscious of the degree to which they reflect the prejudices current in society and as a result, they have not been encouraged to avoid these prejudices. The whole society is culpable. It is logical, therefore, that for us to seek alternatives which are going to maintain and increase black confidence."

— The Townsville Daily Bulletin, Friday, 14 September 1973, pg. 11. Extract from "Doubts Surround Legality Of New Community School"

The article stated that "education authorities" in Brisbane described the Black Community School as being "without either status or standing and a breach of the Education Act", adding that parents of primary school children, who previously attended State schools in South Townsville, but had now been enrolled at the Black Community School, had actually breached the Act and were "liable to prosecution". In addition, they stated that "people attempting to entice children away from a State primary school and enrol them in an unauthorised school not recognised by the State Education Department were also technically guilty of an offence and risked legal proceedings being instituted against them."

According to the NAEC, the above article was "construed as giving the impression that parents would be prosecuted if they sent their children to the school", and as a result, many parents shunned the school. In late 1977, the NAEC noted that whilst the Queensland Department of Education "initially stated that the school had neither standing nor status and therefore the Department did not recognise the school", this was corrected when the school applied for registration.

Professor Martin Nakata, PVC Indigenous Education & Strategy at JCU, delivered the annual Mabo Lecture at the university in 2016, and noted the hypocrisy in the stance taken by the Queensland Education Department at the time, given that the school on Mer and the rest of the Torres Strait Islands (excepting Thursday Island) were not run by the Education Department until 1984, but rather under the auspices of the Department of Aboriginal and Islander Advancement (DAIA), where children were still being taught in "unlined un-insulated fibro buildings" in an education agenda of the DAIA's choosing.

Peter H. Russell writes that Mabo, as chairman of the community council that ran the BCS, became its leader in managing "its often tense relationships with municipal and educational authorities."

The criticisms from the local media were "fended off" by Mabo and colleague D. Tapin, in a formal response compiled on behalf of the Council of the Black Community School, and printed in the Townsville Daily Bulletin on Monday, 17 September 1973. (Note: The Townsville Daily Bulletin. 17 September 1973. Page 2. Reply by Black Community School Council. Messrs. E. Mabo and D. Tapin (note: possibly "Tapim" - source is hard to read), speaking for the Council of the Black Community School, commented yesterday on the "Bulletin" story last Friday on a new community school opened in South Townsville. In their statement they said: "The Council of the Black Community School, Townsville wishes to protest in the strongest terms over the article 'Doubts Surround Legality of New Community School', which appeared in the "Bulletin" on September 14. The Council is of the opinion that the article is inaccurate, misleading and biased. The Council wishes to make the following 12 corrections to inaccuracies contained in the article: (1) The school did not open on September 3. (2) The school does not cater exclusively for primary school students. (3) The school does not cater exclusively for Aboriginal and Torres Strait Island children. (4) The school does not cater exclusively for children of Townsville residents. (5) There are no necessary preliminary formalities to establishing a school laid down by the Education Act 1964-70. (6) The aims of the school are not set out in a roneod circular at present being distributed in Townsville. The aims expressed in this circular are the suggestions of one member of an ad hoc group which met to discuss the feasibility of a new independent school being set up, and were expressed before the final aims and operation of the school had been decided on by the Council. (7) An embryo board of the school does not exist, and the Council does not admit to a big problem in matter of finance. (8) The school does not have one part-time and two full-time teachers working at 50 per cent of normal salary rates. (9) The Council has obtained legal opinion as to the legality of the school and has been advised that parents of children attending the school have not breached the Act. (10) The Queensland Department of Education has been kept informed through meetings with the officers of the intention of the school to seek official approval, and this approval has been official requested by the Council. (11) Under the Education Act, 1964-70, the Minister for Education cannot approve or disapprove a school on the basis of its principles, but only on the basis of the efficiency of instruction given. (12) The boy referred to in the article as a past pupil of the school was not at any stage enrolled as a pupil, as the school at the time of his visit had not opened. In addition to these inaccuracies, the Council is of the opinion that the article showed a bias against the school by not reporting interviews with those Aboriginal and Island people who support the school. The Council wishes to point out that parents of students attending the school are merely exercising their right to send their children to an independent school of their own choice which is more suited to the needs of their children, a right often defended, incidentally, by the "Bulletin". Finally, the Council at this stage does not wish any further publicity for the school. In order to allow opportunity for teachers and students to settle into an established timetable of activities without further interruptions. Enquiries by parents wishing to enrol students in the school are welcome.) In it, "Messrs. E. Mabo and D. Tapin, speaking for the Council of the Black Community School" found that the Council was of the opinion that the article was "inaccurate, misleading and biased" and set forth twelve corrections to inaccuracies which had been contained within the article. The Council finished by stating that it did not wish any further publicity for the school, in order to allow "opportunity for teachers and students to settle into an established timetable of activities without further interruptions". Another letter to the editor on the subject of the school appeared in the paper that same day. (Note: The Townsville Daily Bulletin. 17 September 1973. Page 2. Letters to the Editor. BLACK COMMUNITY SCHOOL. As a citizen of Townsville and a mother of school age children, I am appalled that your paper should print such a biased and misinformed report on the new Black Community School. You should have included comments from the parents of children involved and from the qualified, dedicated teachers who are more than willing to work for lower wages for their ideals of education. The public should be made aware of the fact that small community schools are operating very successfully in Victoria and New South Wales – both Independent and with the Education Department. You should not condemn a new idea, an idea without all the facts being considered. I think the whole idea of the Black Community School is tremendously exciting. The pupil teacher ratio is such that there will be enormous personal involvement and these children will have much more self-confidence to attack the last years of school in a large integrated environment. I wish them success. Sylvia Ramaden. (Mrs.) ([number redacted] Hall Street, Stanton Hill). ('When a "Bulletin" reporter and staff photographer visited the Black Community School in South Townsville on Wednesday morning and attempted to interview teachers attached to the new school, they were informed that the school did not want any publicity at this stage and they had no comment to offer. Information regarding the names of the parents involved and the number of children enrolled was also refused. Ed.")) The editor responded, confirming that "When a "Bulletin" reporter and staff photographer visited the Black Community School in South Townsville on Wednesday morning (12 September) and attempted to interview teachers attached to the new school, they were informed that the school did not want any publicity at this stage and they had no comment to offer. Information regarding the names of the parents involved and the number of children enrolled was also refused. Ed."

According to Reynolds, he and his wife were compelled to write what he described as "one of our indignant letters to the Bulletin, attacking the paper's crusade against the school". This the paper published on 18 September: (Note: The Townsville Daily Bulletin. 18 September 1973. Page 7. BLACK COMMUNITY SCHOOL. We write concerning your article on the Black Community School in your issue of Friday, 14 September, which raises serious misgivings. It would be plain to even the most casual reader that you disapprove of the venture. The article is indeed opinionated, prejudiced and tendentious. Such strong views would be unexceptional were they to appear in an editorial or as signed commentary. What you provide is personal opinion masquerading as news. This must raise doubts about other items of local news and of the ethical standards of your journal. The views embodied in the article are all the more surprising considering the long standing support you have accorded to the right of parents to choose the type of education they desire for their children and to opt out of the State system. The families concerned have acted as many minorities have for at least one hundred years. Many religious groups... most notably the Catholics... have established their own schools, as have national minorities and, in growing numbers, groups of parents who seek an alternative type of education. Community schools are springing up all over Australia... in some States with Education Department support and with the explicit Commonwealth support as foreshadowed in the Karmel Report, despite the specious attempt to use that document to bolster your own case. The fact that some Aboriginal and Island families do not want alternative education is manifestly irrelevant. The basic issue is this... are Aborigines and Torres Strait Islanders to have the same rights as the Catholics, Anglicans, Greeks, Jews, etc., etc.? Your answer, an emphatic even hysterical no, hints at racism and this must cause disquiet about your attitudes to race relations in this area. H. and M. Reynolds ([number redacted] Murray Street, Stanton Hill, Townsville). ("Mr. and Mrs. Reynolds have every right to pass judgement on the article in question. However I do not believe the "Bulletin" has passed any judgement on the proposal. It has presented facts as related. Had normal procedures been followed regarding the new school it certainly would not have made the type of headlines that the position, as it existed last week called for. Ed."))

We write concerning your article on the Black Community School in your issue of Friday, September 14, which raises serious misgivings. It would be plain to even the most casual reader that you disapprove of the venture. The article is indeed opinionated, prejudiced and tendentious. Such strong views would be unexceptional were they to appear in an editorial or as signed commentary. What you provide is personal opinion masquerading as news. This must raise doubts about other items of local news and of the ethical standards of your journal.

The Reynolds' letter drew attention to the Townsville Daily Bulletin's previously demonstrated "long standing support" of the rights of parents of religious groups to choose the type of education they desired for their children and to opt out of the State system, and asked whether Aboriginal and Torres Strait Islander people were not to have the "same rights as the Catholics, Anglicans, Greeks, Jews, etc., etc.?" The editor responded: "Mr. and Mrs. Reynolds have every right to pass judgement on the article in question. However I do not believe the "Bulletin" has passed any judgement on the proposal. It has presented facts as related. Had normal procedures been followed regarding the new school it certainly would not have made the type of headlines that the position, as it existed last week called for. Ed."

On 19 September, the Townsville Daily Bulletin printed a front-page piece entitled "Motives Of City's "Black School" Justifiably Suspicious" in which it was reported that "the Education Minister, Sir Alan Fletcher, told Parliament today that he thought there was justifiable suspicion about the motives of those involved in setting up a "black community school" in South Townsville." (Note: The Townsville Daily Bulletin. 19 September 1973. Front page: MOTIVES OF CITY'S "BLACK SCHOOL" JUSTIFIABLY SUSPICIOUS. Brisbane, Sept. 18 – The Education Minister, Sir Alan Fletcher, told Parliament today that he thought there was justifiable suspicion about the motives of those involved in setting up a "black community school" in South Townsville. Sir Alan was replying in Parliament to a question by Mr. T Aikens (N.Q.L.P., Townsville South) who asked if those responsible for this school were the group known as the "Red Element" at the James Cook University, and who were diverting Commonwealth funds to maintain it. Mr. Aikens said the school had been publicly condemned as "apartheid in reverse," and "racist," by members of the black and white community in Townsville. Those sponsoring the school had stated that the Queensland education system had failed miserably if success was the measure of educational attainments and achievements of black people. Sir Alan said he had received protests from Townsville about the school. He understood that a man named Penrith, a graduate of the Tasmanian University, was the motivating personality on the basis that State schools had failed to do justice, or had perpetuated injustice, to Aboriginal children up there. The Minister said he was not sure where the proposal for the school had emanated, and did not know exactly how Commonwealth funds were involved in it. A speculative newspaper report had suggested that abschol funds were involved in the school which was attended by 10 children and had three teachers. TEACHERS. He understood two high school teachers had resigned and that an island teacher had been engaged to teach at this school. Sir Alan said that an application would have to be made to have the school recognised, and when that application was received it would be investigated to see what it was all about. Some of the local Aboriginal leaders had been quoted as not approving because the cause of integration would not be served by making a school available purely for black children. Sir Alan said Aboriginals attending State schools got on very well with the staff and other children. GROUND GAINED. There could be exceptions, but by and large his department's integration programme was gaining ground each year. The suggestion that this school had been set up because of injustice to Aboriginal children just did not stand up, said Sir Alan. "I think I can understand some of the locally expressed opinions that those who are involved in this have motives that are open to a great deal of suspicion," said Sir Alan. "In fact, I think that suspicion is justifiable," he said.) The possibility of Communist interference was raised by Tom Aikens of the North Queensland Labor Party who questioned Sir Fletcher whether those responsible for the school were the group known as the "Red Element" at James Cook University.

Community debate "raged for a week or two", according to Henry Reynolds, with the school appearing in several Letters to the Editor in the Bulletin in the days following the "Justifiably Suspicious" article of 19 September 1973. (Note: The Townsville Daily Bulletin. 21 September 1973. Page 12. [LETTER ONE] SCHOOL ISSUE. I am disturbed that despite your claim that your paper presents "facts as related," you have seen fit to stoke up the Black Community School non-controversy with a headline article concocted entirely out of speculation and innuendo. The substance of your article is as follows: a local MLA under privilege, asked a question, obviously absurd, misinformed, and snidely provocative. A minister, who six days ago had not heard of the school in question, replied, saying in essence that he knew nothing about the matter, but that for reasons he left unstated, "suspicion is justifiable." Suspicion of what? Your newspaper has seen fit to take those two words, absurd and unsupported as they are, and trumpet them to the Townsville public as a statement of great import. Your attitude to the school can only be interpreted as naive or hostile, I presume it to be hostile. Can I prevail on you to explain your antipathy? Would it be too much to ask of the "Bulletin" that an editorial be devoted to setting out your attitude to the Black Community School? A group of people has established a school. The school, as I understand it, is an experiment, to see if a more satisfactory education can be achieved for black children. Its flaws and possible pitfalls are apparent to everyone, but the school appears to me, and to many, to be a step in the right direction. Sir Alan Fletcher has argued, with the denial reflexes of a Cabinet Minister, that all is well in Aboriginal education, and no extra-departmental measures are called for. "If our education system has failed, then we should be shown where it has failed." Sir Alan has not looked very hard. In dozens of Queensland schools there are Aboriginal children, relegated to the lowest grades, years older than their classmates, condemned to low achievement, identifiable by the blank, hopeless eyes of people with no future. How many Aborigines graduate annually from our universities? Have you ever met an Aboriginal doctor? The Aboriginal youths who roam Townsville on Friday nights in their cowboy shirts – ask one of them (he won't bite) what he does for a living – how he did at school – what school did for him. Don't expect polite answers. Aboriginal education is a mess. The Australian Aborigine is as intelligent as anyone else who you reads your paper. Nor does he lack motivation: the desire to achieve things in society. What you must grasp is that he is different – of a different culture – and that our education system, oriented to European culture, simply will not work for Aboriginal children. The Black Community School is an attempt to find a system that will work. Your newspaper seems anxious to discredit that attempt. So do several members of the Legislative Assembly. Why? What is there to fear in the Black Community School? Is there something terrifying in the prospect of a roomful of black children? There are many schoolrooms in this State filled with black children. Not many of those children are likely to achieve much there. Do you have some interest in preserving that situation – in ensuring education for Aboriginal children continues to be the dismal failure it has always been? The Black Community School is not illegal. It is not "racist", nor is it the work of a "Red Element", whatever that may be, nor is "suspicion" of it "justified". It is a group of Australians trying to achieve a better education for their children. If the "Bulletin" objects to that, could it justify its objection? Until a worthwhile objection is stated, I commend the Black Community School to the people of Townsville as deserving of their sympathy and support – Peter Bell (Box 199 P.O. Hermit Park) (Editor response: Mr. Bell has unfortunately made the same assessment in this matter as have some others. The views expressed in the columns of a newspaper on any subject are not necessarily the views of the company controlling the paper or those of any person associated with the compilation of any news story.) [LETTER TWO] A STRONG PROTEST. I wish to register a strong protest against the recent statement of the Education Minister, Sir Alan Fletcher, in impugning the motives of those involved with Townsville's black community school, and the prominence given to this statement in Wednesday’s "Bulletin". Most Australian educators would agree that until recently, the record of Aboriginal education in this country is largely a record of failure, despite a considerable amount of dedication on the part of those concerned. The failure is attested to by the virtual absence of Aborigines from the professions, and from white collar jobs in general. It is also evidenced by the present flurry of activity, in Queensland as well as in other States and Commonwealth territories, in developing programmes more suited to Aboriginal conditions and needs. Honest educators are willing to admit that the one big area where our knowledge is most limited is the area of motivation. We would all like to know which are the factors that will motivate the Aboriginal child to learn in the school situation, and which are those that will motivate his parents to use every effort to keep him at school and to encourage his efforts there. Although I am strongly opposed to the development of a segregated school system in Australia, I consider the present small development in Townsville, which has been initiated by indigenous people themselves, and which aims to maintain indigenees (sic) among it planners, to be worthy of the most serious study. The only criterion in question should be the standard of its offerings to the children who attend it – and the State department has already been approached to inspect the school on this basis. Polish, Jewish, Catholic, Presbyterian and other private schools with much larger intakes manage to operate without incurring the suspicions of the Minister. I fail to see why an Aboriginal community school should be discriminated against in this way – Dr. Betty Drinkwater (Lecturer in Psychology, James Cook University) [LETTER THREE] BLACK SCHOOL. Discussion in your pages about the "Black School" provides a welcome opportunity to restate two important principles. (1) It doesn't matter a tinker's curse what the "Bulletin" or Mr. Aikens or Mr. Reynolds, or I, think about Mr. Penrith, racism in reverse, or integration. The parents of the children attending the Black School, and they alone, have a right to decide whether their children should be taught the principles of which the school is founded. The Department of Education has a duty to ensure that the school's pupils will receive a formal education adequate for their needs. But the ethical, social, political, and religious ethos of the school is a matter for the school and the parents of the children who go there. (2) Each child attending the school, like all children attending all independent schools, should receive a grant from tax revenue approximately equal to the amount of money spent on each pupil in a State school. A system which reserves tax money, collected from all citizens alike, for the exclusive use of State school pupils, is oppressive. A majority in a community has no right to impose a financial burden on a minority which chooses to educate its children in accordance with its own principles. (end) I have no axe to grind in this matter. I have heard Mr. Penrith speak only once, and, as far as I can judge, his opinions are abhorrent to me. Nor do I share the views of what has been laughably called the "Red Element". By all means let anyone who disagrees with their views say so. But please let there be no suggestion that people with whom we disagree are not entitled to bring up their children as they see fit – Donal Gallagher, [number redacted] Hammond Street, Mysterton Estate) The school ultimately survived the debacle, with Reynolds explaining how himself and his wife "continued to provide what support we could. Margaret gave professional advice about staffing, teaching methods and equipment and monitored the children's progress".

Writing a piece about the Black Community School for the journal Social Alternatives in August 1981, Margaret Reynolds introduced her article by recalling the "Motives Of City's "Black School" Justifiably Suspicious" headline, a statement which had been issued by the State Government Education Minister "from his office a thousand miles from this city", and was "granted front page status in the Townsville Daily Bulletin, a paper which usually reserved its Page 1 for coverage of international or national events except, of course, when reporting local disasters." Reynolds noted the hypocrisy of the situation that while enforced segregation had been an aspect of Queensland policy since the late 19th century, "voluntary separatism was regarded as totally unacceptable".

=== Other initial criticism ===
Reynolds notes that opposition to the Black Community School project was also voiced within, from prominent members of the Aboriginal community, "especially those who had come from Palm Island" and who felt that segregated schooling in the method envisaged would be a "retrograde step".

Community debate carried on for some weeks, with James Cook academics, including Dr. Betty Drinkwater, Lecturer in Psychology, coming out in support of the school. However strong the hostility to the Black Community School, it was "nowhere near as intense" as that which had been aroused previously by the December 1967 referendum conference, according to Reynolds. Mabo acknowledged that there was a fear at the outset that what he was teaching in the school was black power. He added "Perhaps it would be better than teaching white power wouldn't it?"

=== 1974 onwards ===
"During that time, from the onset of the Black Community School, I found that I didn't know enough to be able to do it effectively and I stood back for a long time, for about twelve months or more, trying to figure out which way I would fit in, until I was forced to decide when the Principal decided to resign..."

— Eddie Koiki Mabo, from the 1996 biography Edward Koiki Mabo. His Life and Struggle for Land Rights

Initially taking a more background approach to the operation of the school, Mabo stopped forward to become principal of the school after the initial one resigned, and from thenceforth played a more active role in the decision making processes. Mabo admitted in his biography that he had very little experience on which to draw, having no 'theory of white education', no knowledge of the processes which teachers go through, and "didn't know how and what areas (he) should look for in terms of selecting the right people to work in the school." With the assistance of the Reynolds', Noel Loos, and other educationists, Mabo was able to "take certain actions whenever things became necessary."

Reviewing the initial years of the school, Mabo reflected in his biography that if the school were to come into existence again, he would do it differently, "not that I am very good at it, but I think I have learnt quite a few tricks since that time":

I feel a lot of the material being taught at the Colleges is not relevant. They definitely are not relevant to us at all and the teachers that are being selected to teach in those schools have no understanding of how Aboriginals and Islanders behave, and what excites them and what does not excite them.

In April 1974, the Australian Council of Churches (ACC) gave a grant of AUD $1,000 to the school, the first grant to be allocated from a "recently established Aboriginal Development Fund." In announcing the grant, Terry Widders, secretary of the ACC Commission on Aboriginal Development said "The money will be given [..] to Aboriginal and Islander community groups who have a specific program and are sufficiently organised to implement their program."

Roberta Warnock, Race Relations Officer at JCU, writing in the University of New South Wales student magazine Tharunka in June 1974, noted that 'National AUS' donated $3,000 to the school when it started, and another $3,000 when it "restarted in 1974". As of June 1974, Warnock stated that the Commonwealth Government would not consider giving financial aid to the school until the State Education Department gave the school official approval, and the Department had "not yet indicated when an inspector (would) be sent to inspect it". Warnock stated that grades 1-7 were being taught in the school, and that there were "not quite 30 students to date".

Initially aimed at educating older children "late in their primary schooling", as stated above, by January 1975, the Black Community School realized it was too difficult to finance the extensive resources required at secondary level, and amended its original aim and (as of a source from August 1977) operated to provide the best possible early education up to secondary level.

In August 1975, the Minister of State for Education, Kim Edward Beazley released a list of non-systemic schools in each state of Australia which were prepared in accordance with the States Grants (Schools) Act 1973-1974. The Black Community School was included on the list.

In September 1975, it was reported in the Tribune (the official newspaper of the Communist Party of Australia), that three black rights activists were being charged with 'intention to extort' after a 'Black delegation' visited the president of the University of Queensland in Brisbane with the intention of trying to raise money through the student body for the establishment of a 'Black community school' on Palm Island Aboriginal reserve.

In 1975, Mabo was asked to join the National Aboriginal Education Committee (NAEC), an advisory body to the Commonwealth Education Department, on which he served for three years. At this time he also chaired the Torres Strait Border Action Committee in Townsville.

The Black Community School eventually received limited support from the Australian School's Commission, a program of the Whitlam and Fraser governments, and the Queensland State Education system. In 1976, the Federal Department of Aboriginal Affairs took responsibility for overall funding for the school, however under-funding was a constant threat to the school's viability.

=== 1976 assessment ===
"Much could be written to describe this alternative school. It impresses as one of individuality and innovation. Children work basically in two groups, the infants occupying one section of a large open area and the primary the other [..] The school appears to be well equipped with a variety of resource materials. The atmosphere is friendly and supportive so children appear well adjusted to the school's program, which aims to provide individually for its pupils." — Margaret Reynolds, Preliminary Assessment of Achievement Levels in an Ethnic Community School (1977)

In June 1976, Margaret Reynolds, local schoolteacher and later a Senator for Queensland from 1983-1999, was invited to the Black Community School for the purposes of assessing the children's learning development versus pupils of a similar age in the State schooling system, and wrote a preliminary report of the results for the journal The Aboriginal Child at School, published in August 1977. (Note: Note: In her summary of the school's history on the first page of the report, Reynolds stated that the Black Community School was established in October 1974)

The assessment procedures as well as the subdivision of ages for testing are shown in the table below.

Assessment procedures at the Black Community School - June 1976
Infant Group		Primary Group
Children aged 5 to 7 years whose performance levels could be equated with those of Grades 1 and 2		Children aged 8 to 12 years whose performance could be equated with those of Grades 3 to 7
Grade 1 Only	Grade 2 Only	Grades 3-7
Reading Readiness Test. This test was devised in co-operation with teachers at the Central State School and incorporates Frostig, Wepman and Tasley sub-tests Sub-tests: Fine motor skill, visual discrimination, auditory discrimination, auditory memory, phonetic knowledge, spatial and number concept	St Lucia word recognition test, Schonell spelling test	Concise word reading test (forms B and C), G.A.P. reading comprehension test (form B), Schonell spelling test, Moreton maths test, Metric revision (Level II, form N)

Reynolds outlined her findings in the journal, noting that the development of the children was largely on par with that of their Central State School equivalents, although "several" of the Torres Strait Island children in the 'Grades 3-7' bracket "require(d) instruction to further their understanding and usage of English."

In her conclusion, Reynolds stated it was "too soon to accurately measure the long term success of the Black Community School, where children have been enrolled for only 6 to 10 months", but quoted James Samuel Coleman's "Coleman Report" of 1966 (Equality of Educational Opportunity), which found that "...of all variables measuring the attitude of student interest in school, self-concept and sense of environmental control showed the greatest relation to achievement". Reynolds concluded that "it would seem" that the Black Community School was succeeding in providing an environment where "such factors (were) likely to develop", and encouraged educators to follow the future progress of the school closely to see if "its priorities of ethnic pride and parent involvement do, in fact, produce significant gains in educational achievement."

=== NAEC ===
In March 1977, the National Aboriginal Education Committee was established in order to provide the Minister for Education and his Department with informed views on the educational needs of the Aboriginal community within Australia. At the first meeting of the NAEC in April 1977, the Commonwealth Department of Education referred the matter of the Black Community School, Townsville to the NAEC in the following terms:

The situation at this moment is that the school faces closure at the end of the first term, i.e. in May, if the Department of Aboriginal Affairs withdraws its financial support, as it is thinking of doing.

DAA is concerned about low student attendance and apparent lack of interest by the parents. While DAA considers it to be an important educational facility, they take the view that they should avoid funding projects which they consider important but which the community does not.

Before making a decision about withdrawal of funding, they have asked for the advice of this Department. Our response has been to request DAA to postpone a final decision until the National Aboriginal Education Committee has had the chance to decide whether it would wish to be involved in the matter. DAA has agreed to do this.

From the Department's point of view, NAEC involvement would be highly desirable. Much of the issue turns on the question of community support, and Aboriginal community feeling about such an intensively Aboriginal project as the Black Community School and its future is something which the NAEC is, we believe, particularly well qualified to investigate."

=== 1977 NAEC study ===
In December 1977, the National Aboriginal Education Committee, chaired by Stephen Albert, published a 32-page report (or study) on the Black Community School which they had undertaken during the first week of August 1977. The opportunity to study the BCS was described by the NAEC as being of particular significance to them, as there were "so few educational services provided for Aboriginal and Torres Strait Islander people for their own communities", and gave the NAEC an "opportunity to consider the practical implications of a policy of alternative schooling for Aboriginal children". The study was described by NAEC as their "first major task" as an organisation. Koiki Mabo, although being a part of the NAEC, was not included in the sub-committee group of the NAEC which carried out the study. The sub-committee also acknowledged the apparent conflict-of-interest in themselves, an Aboriginal committee, investigating a school run with Aboriginal and Torres Strait Islander aims, but maintained that they had remained professional in their approach throughout the study.

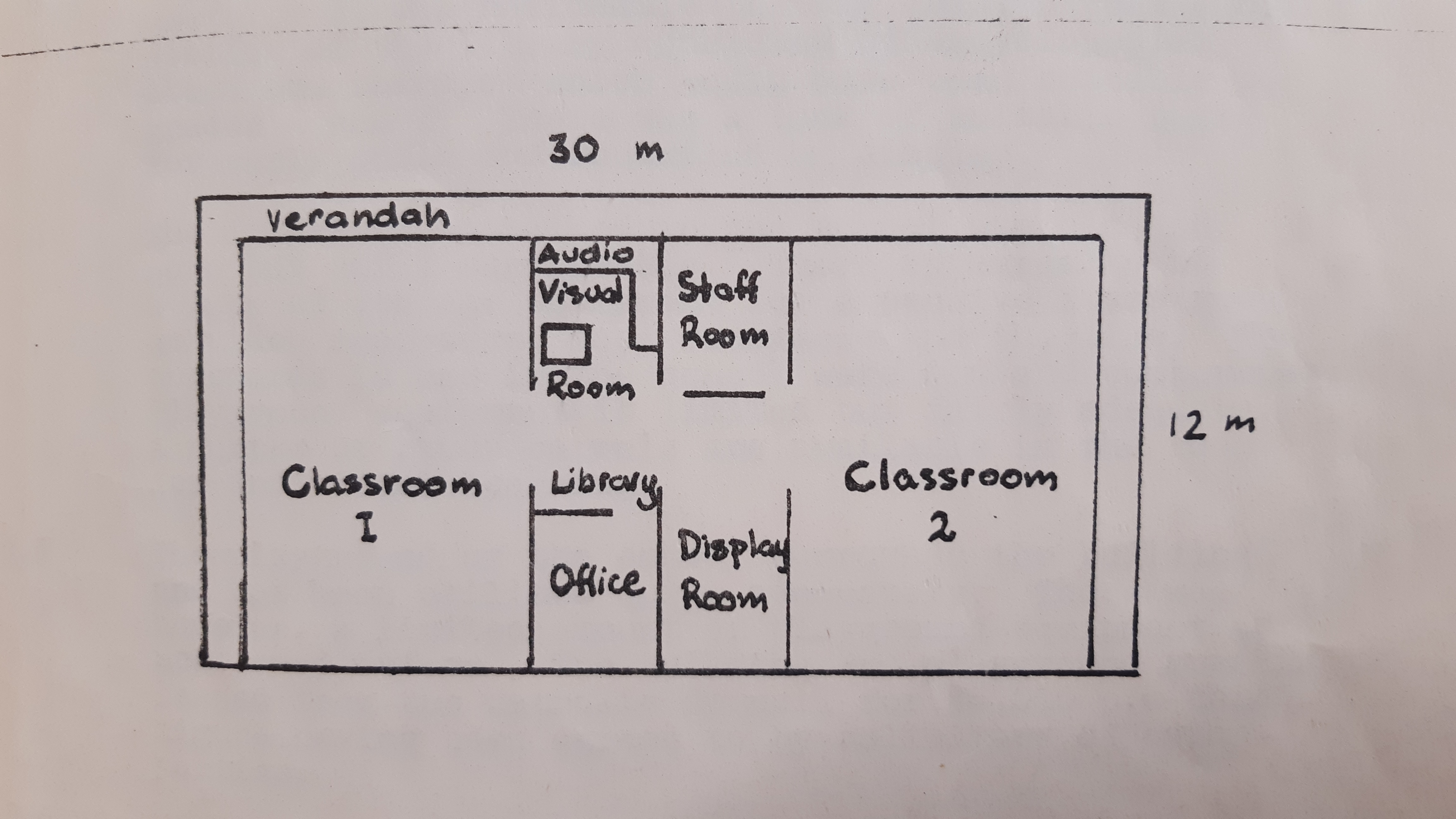
Plan of the Black Community School as published in the 1977 NAEC study

Discussions had previously been held with the Aboriginal Consultative Group to the Schools Commission regarding a study of the school. "Extensive plans" had been made, but had not proceeded due to "certain difficulties." As a result, the NAEC passed a resolution agreeing to carry out a study of the school, but asked that funding of the school be continued to the end of the 1977 school year, as a fair evaluation would not be possible "unless teachers are students (were) secure and operating under normal conditions." This resolution was welcomed and accepted by both the Department of Education, and the Department of Aboriginal Affairs (DAA).

The DAA noted that "sufficient time (had) elapsed for a thorough investigation of the school's effectiveness to be undertaken" and that the immediate objective of the study was to establish whether the school should be continued to be subsidised with DAA funds past 1977. It outlined questions to be addressed, including:

- Relationship of school provision to actual community need. Since its inception there have been serious doubt on this point.
- The cost of maintaining the school, and present and appropriate sources of funds.
- Wider criteria for the evaluation derived from the school as an instance of an independent and Aboriginal/Islander system

The NAEC study team spent a week at the school observing school activities, and also attempted to contact as many Aboriginal and Torres Strait Islander people in the area as possible, mostly by visits to homes. The team also sponsored a public meeting at the Townsville Aboriginal Medical Services, which gave an opportunity for public discussions of the issues involved, at which more that 50 people attended.

The study acknowledged that while there could be doubt surrounding Mabo's "unbounded commitment to the schools' principal and potential", it criticised his apparent lack of organisation as Director of the school, and although being a very articulate, convincing person whom the parents looked up to, he "lack(ed) skills in certain areas where he needs to be better prepared or else delegate to others". Because of this, the NAEC noted that many facets of the school administration were being inefficiently conducted. In keeping the school's finances in order, Mabo preferred not to take what he referred as "fat cat advice" on these matters, which led the NAEC to describe the cash flow in the school as a "disaster". The insurance for public liability, fire and theft, content and workers' compensation had also not been paid, which Mabo agreed was "contrary to common sense of financial liability".

In the summary of their study, the NAEC stated that the school had serious deficiencies in its administration, but praised the atmosphere: "It has however a marvellously refreshing tone about it [..] the happiness of the students and staff in the school setting is a real joy to experience." The NAEC recommended that Mabo receive short term training in budgeting and school administration, and longer term training in educational theory and practice, and set out a further list of 11 recommendations for the school going forward.

The NAEC judged that, although exhibiting major faults, the school could not be considered a failure at this stage, considering how lacking support services had been to the school, and recommended that DAA funding continue, at least to the end of the 1979 school year, provided that the recommendations they had made were implemented, or in process of being implemented by the "end of this financial year".

=== 1978 onwards ===
In August 1978, Mabo presented on behalf of the BCS a successful funding proposal to the Australian Institute of Aboriginal Studies to enable him to "explore the possibility of the establishment" of what would be named the Magani Institute. Mabo envisaged the institute becoming a parent organisation for the BCS, and other such Torres Strait Islander schools, which could develop in the near future in the neighbouring city of Mackay and even on Mer, but with each school to be operated by their own Parents Council. Amongst other services, the institute would provide educational consultation, an information centre "for all things Torres Strait Islander", a translation service and a housing fund.

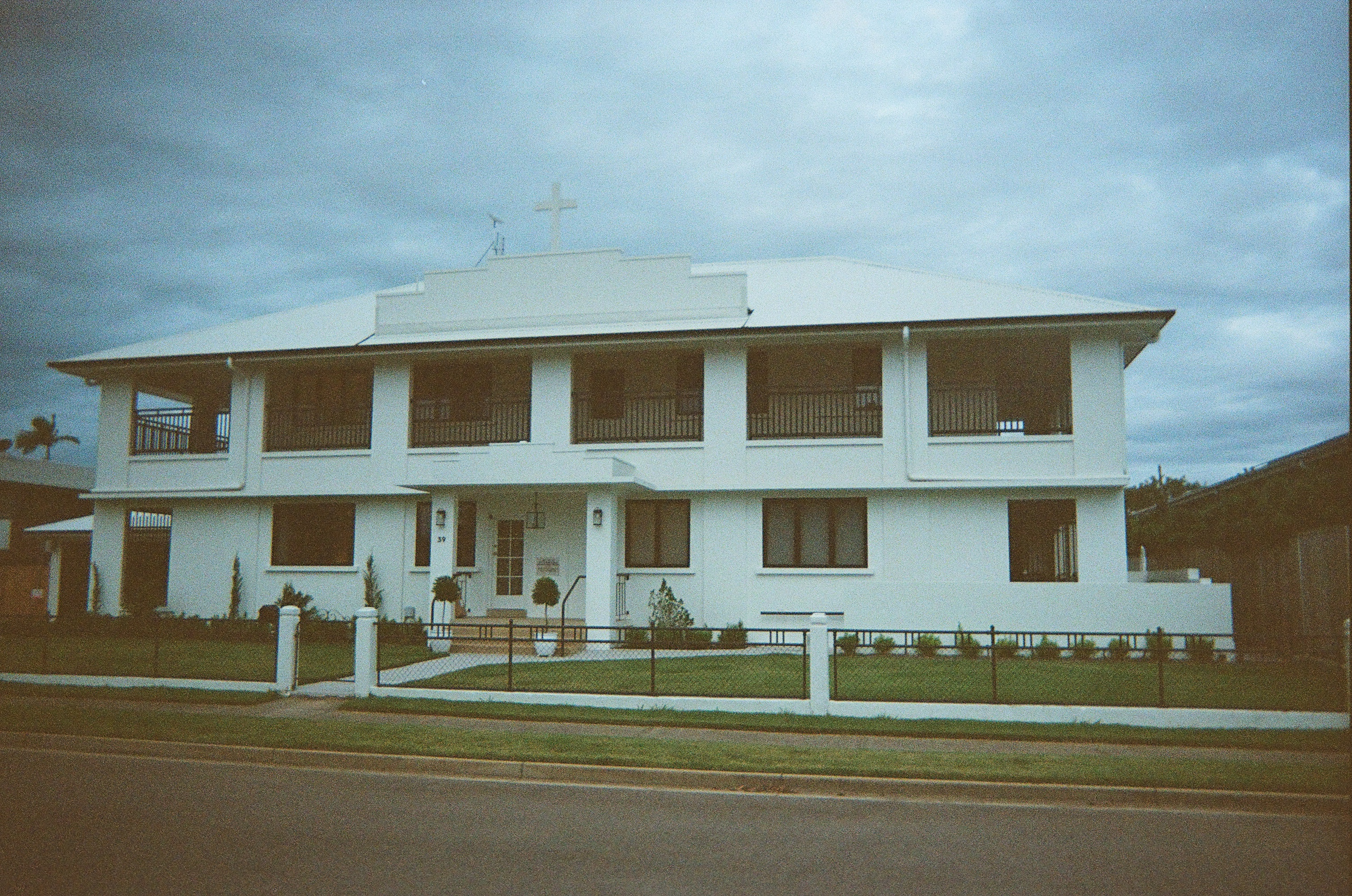
The Black Community School building in July 2025

At its peak in the late 1970s, forty five students were enrolled at the school, according to the AIATSIS.

In the 1980s, before the Black Community School was closed, Koiki Mabo undertook a Diploma of Education at the former College of Advanced Education, on the Western campus at James Cook University. From June 1981 to December 1984, Mabo worked as a student teacher at JCU, hoping that a course in education "would prepare him for a more meaningful involvement" with the Black Community School. Mabo did not complete the course, finding classroom teaching a bleak and disconcerting experience" and that classroom teaching "was not for him", especially when teaching infant classes. According to Loos, the effort was not in vain however, as Mabo clearly profited from the exposure to the Western perspective of education, and realised "even more clearly" that it was fundamentally destructive of Torres Strait Islander people and their culture.

In July 1980, it was reported in Woroni, a student publication at Australian National University, that the Australian Union of Students (AUS) had recently convened at Wollongong University to hold a conference, at which one of the items discussed was whether the AUS "should pay the Black Community School the $8,000 (they) still owe(d) them". At their Annual Council, held in January 1981, the issue of whether or not AUS should continue their "direct funding" of the school was one of the "contentious issues" debated, according to the Tribune. The article stated that "many divisions" had appeared in the Australian Labor Party Caucus over a number of issues, including the funding of the Black Community School.

On the webpage mabonativetitle.com, Koiki and Bonita's commitment to the project is remembered thus:

Before this, school had always been the place where black children learned white culture and lost their own. The community school was based in Townsville and Mabo became its Director. Even when pregnant, and caring for six children, Bonita Mabo played a major role at the school, while Koiki sought students and funding, and fended off attacks from the local media.

== Operations ==
=== Manifesto ===
A manifesto of the schools aims was compiled by Mabo, as well as other founding parents in the early 1970s:

(a) to give black children an alternative education more suited to their needs;
(b) to involve the children's parents and community in these children's education;
(c) to avoid the post grade four slump in learning by substituting a schooling which will give encouragement and hope, not indifference;
(d) to substitute teachers who are understanding of Aborigine's difficulties and differences in outlook and aspiration;
(e) to provide a satisfactory climate for the tuition of children who are academically oriented and motivated towards eventual tertiary education, and;
(f) to be a focus around which the Black community can operate.

Professor Martin Nakata noted in his 2016 Mabo Lecture entitled "Re-thinking Indigenous Learning Support" that "despite improvements, many of the points in the Black Community School's manifesto still apply to a large degree", adding:

The post grade four slump is now the post Year 3 Benchmark gap which widens again in Year 6 and Year 9. We are still searching for more effective and appropriate education for different cultural and community contexts.

=== Philosophy ===
Peter H. Russell notes that many of the causes which Mabo fought for, represented the approach to reforming Aboriginal relations premised on the concept of 'classical egalitarianism', such as the provision of better and fairer access to services that would make it easier for indigenous Australians to enjoy the full benefits of the Australian citizenship to which they were entitled. These reforms, he argued, however liberal, progressive and greatly valued, would never be enough "to establish a just relationship with aboriginal peoples, a relationship based on mutual consent which could be truly post-colonial":

When the liberal, egalitarian, but fundamentally integrationist approach is the only one on offer, it becomes illiberal - a softer form of forced assimilation. In effect, aboriginal peoples are offered full membership in the dominant society on condition that they abandon their aboriginality - that they give up any effective means of continuing the historical societies from which they derive so much of their own sense of identity and self-worth.

The Black Community School, Russell argues, was the one project of Mabo's making, above any other, which "held some possibility of working at this balance". It was Mabo's desire that the education provided in the school would give students a greater grounding and pride in their own "distinct heritage" while at the same time preparing them for effective participation in modern Australian life into which they would eventually go. Mabo was aware that for the children to establish a successful life for themselves in the dominant society they would need to master the English language and customs, but at the same time he was "determined to nurture knowledge of the(ir) traditional culture, which he saw as the source of his own inner strength and sense of purpose."

=== Management ===
The school maintained a community ethos from the beginning, with the involvement and engagement of parents being pivotal, as according to Mabo the underlying management of the school was intended to be the parents' responsibility. According to Loos, there "always seemed to be some parents at the school participating in some way in the education of their children."

In a study of the BCS conducted by the NAEC in 1977, it was noted that the School Council was ostensibly regarded as the official governing body of the school; its responsibility being "to direct the activities of the school and to prepare and instruct the Director to implement all things pertaining to the running of the school." However, the NAEC noted that in actual practice, the Director (Mabo) had assumed total responsibility, and "it seems that the influence of the Council is minimal, even in such thing as selection of staff which is made by the Director."

=== Teachers and pupils ===
In his biography, Mabo explained his reason for giving up his job as a gardener at JCU in 1975, which he had held since 1967:

A man's influence was needed at that school (the Black Community School) because we were dealing with kids from different areas, different areas of the Torres Strait and with different kinds of behavioural patterns; and you needed a man there to be able to control that. I had to be there.

Mabo worked for no wages for the majority of his time with the school. In his biography, he explains how Netta (his wife) and Anwyl only got paid "for two or three days" as teachers aides, with the rest of their hours devoted free of charge. Mabo recounts how he and his wife lived in this fashion until 1977.

To justify funding, the school was subject to a number of reports by white and Aboriginal education professionals over the years, as a result of which Mabo came into contact with educators of the day such as Anwyl Burfein, Sandra Renew, Geoff Coombs, Rob Renew, Julia Koppe and Margaret Reynolds.

As of August 1977, the staff at the school were as follows:

- Director (unpaid) - Mr Eddy (sic) Koiki Mabo
- Teacher (trained) - Mrs Sue Dellow
- Aide - Mrs Doolah
- Aide - Miss Margaret Doolah
- Aide - Mrs Mabo (unpaid)

=== School transport ===
In 1977, the NAEC noted how the transport systems of Townsville's four bus services did "not provide a service suited to the needs of the school at all". Mismanagement in the school was such that it was noted that provision of money for a bus had actually been included in the past two budgets, and had been available since June 1976, but no action had been taken by the School Council and indications were that the Council had been unaware of this fact.

=== Aboriginal/Torres Strait Islander ethos ===
According to Henry Reynolds, "The school began, and remained, largely a Torres Strait Islander - or even a Murray Islander - initiative", and created a space in which the five different Torres Strait Island community groups could meet; who would ordinarily have never had that chance to meet in the Torres Strait Islands. During the 1970s, the "black identity" which Mabo had "enthusiastically espoused" from the outset of the Black Community School project, had begun to splinter into two separate indigenous identities, according to Noel Loos; those of Aboriginal and Torres Strait Islander. In pursuing their own causes and issues, Mabo believed that the Torres Strait Islander community in mainland Australia were "being swamped" by the larger representation and greater political clout of their Aboriginal colleagues, who "without malice, simply focused on their own issues."

According to Loos, Mabo became aware of this in his becoming a member of the National Aboriginal Education Committee (NAEC) and the National Aboriginal Arts Board (from 1972), where, although feeling honoured to be admitted and appreciating the prestige, "he believed he was the token Torres Strait Islander, the add-on in the title to denote an illusory, indigenous comprehensiveness: Aboriginal and Torres Strait Islander. From 1987 to 1988, Mabo sat as vice-chairman on Magani Malu Kes, an organisation that promoted Torres Strait Islander identity and autonomy, and was set up to counter the perceived neglect of Islanders in indigenous issues. The pursuit of separate autonomy for Torres Strait Islanders culminated, according to Loos, in the creation and adoption of their own flag in 1992. The flag was recognised on 14 July 1995 when the governor-general of Australia proclaimed both it and the Aboriginal flag as 'flags of Australia'.

=== South Townsville ===
The suburb of South Townsville, adjacent to the port, and where the Black Community School was located, was traditionally a working class area and the home of lower-income groups. In the 1987 iteration of the publication The Townsville Region. A Profile and Social Atlas, produced by Townsville City Council, the suburb of South Townsville was profiled, with the following assessment:

Socio-economic segregation in Townsville determined which side of the river was allocated to the working-classes. Subsequently the less environmentally agreeable section of Townsville, subjected to tidal and periodic flooding, mangroves and poor access to the central business district, became the home of the lower-income groups. Restricted by lack of transport, South Townsville's residential area developed within walking distance of Townsville's major employers - the wharves and the railway yards. Boarding and guest houses, hotels and hostels, developed quickly to provide accommodation for the single males seeking work in the area.

== Legacy ==
In his 2016 Mabo Lecture, Professor Nakata noted that Koiki Mabo was "a thinker as much as he was an activist", and that in the way the curriculum was developed at the BCS, "the school engaged the fundamental tensions that still frame our approaches to Indigenous education today." Nakata noted that as of 2016, James Cook University had 770 Indigenous students and the numbers were growing, but in order to "reach population parity levels of the region, we should have double the numbers."

On 17 November 2018, Bonita Mabo (1943–2018) was bestowed with an Honorary Doctor of Letters by James Cook University in recognition of her "advocacy work for Indigenous schooling" and her campaigning for the rights of Indigenous Australians and Australian South Sea Islanders. The university commended her work as co-founder of "Australia's first Indigenous community school", the Black Community School, where she worked as a teacher's aide "and oversaw the day-to-day operations, including providing continuity and cultural training to all children." The university also recognised that Mabo was considered to be a "stabilising influence" at the school at a time when it was "considered unacceptable to have discrete curricula and teaching policies for Australian Aboriginal and Torres Strait Islander children." Mabo died nine days after receiving the award.

Bonita's contribution to the Black Community School, as well as the school itself, were recognised shortly after her death by the mayor of Townsville, Councillor Jenny Hill at the Ordinary Council meeting of Townsville City Council with the following mention:

That Black Community School was started with ten students and two teachers who volunteered on half pay. But the school taught them very much the basics and in the 70's things were quite different to what they are now. They learnt to read and write but they also learnt about their history and culture, which was something that wasn't taught in normal schools. In its peak it had 45 students enrolled but sadly would go on to close in the mid-eighties through lack of funding.

== In media ==
- The school is depicted in Mabo, a 2012 Australian docudrama TV film about Mabo's life
- Gail Mabo and Ernie Dingo visit the site of the school in Season 6 Episode 4 of Going Places with Ernie Dingo

== See also ==
- Australia in the Vietnam War (1962–1972), which ended prior to the opening of the Black Community School, but raised distrust in perceived Communist-aligned projects
- Aboriginals Protection and Restriction of the Sale of Opium Act 1897, an Act of the Parliament of Queensland which was the first instrument of separate legal control over Aboriginal peoples, and was more restrictive than any contemporary legislation operating in other states
- Benezet's School, a school for African Americans established by Quaker abolitionist Anthony Benezet in Philadelphia in 1770
- The Black Community School, Brisbane
- Blacktown Native Institution Site (est. 1822), the earliest Aboriginal school in the colony
- History of Indigenous Australians
- Kura kaupapa Māori, Māori-language immersion schools in New Zealand, where the philosophy and practice reflect Māori cultural values with the aim of revitalising Māori language, knowledge and culture
- List of schools in North Queensland
- National Aboriginal Education Committee (NAEC), an organisation which existed from 1977 to 1989
- National Aboriginal and Torres Strait Islander Education Policy, a national policy adopted by the Government of Australia by each State and Territory government which was first introduced in 1989 and is the foundation of education programs for all Indigenous Australians.

== Sources ==
- Beckett, Jeremy (1996). "Review of the book "Edward Koiki Mabo: His Life and Struggle for Land Rights" by Noel Loos, Koiki Mabo". Aboriginal History. 20. Canberra: Australian National University Press: 215–219. JSTOR 24046138.
- Faulkner, Samantha, ed. (2024). Growing Up Torres Strait Islander in Australia. Melbourne: Black Inc. ISBN 9781760644420.
- Heuschele, Margaret (2000). In the Shadow of Castle Hill. Townsville: Townsville Library Service. ISBN 1-875830-41-3.
- Hornby, Frank; Rasmussen, Cecily (1 April 1987). Hornby, Frank (ed.). The Townsville Region. A Profile and Social Atlas. Townsville: Townsville City Council (Community Services Department). ISBN 0959112375.
- Horton, David, ed. (1994). The Encyclopaedia of Aboriginal Australia. Volume 2: M-Z. Canberra: Aboriginal Studies Press (for the Australian Institute of Aboriginal and Torres Strait Islander Studies). ISBN 0-85575-250-5.
- Hurlstone, Ivy; McPherson, Jillian; Brien, Kenneth; West, Kristy (2009). Queensland, Australia. Concise Historical Chronology 1770-2009. Queensland: Bookmen Publishers & Erinport Pty Ltd. ISBN 978-0-9756838-9-7.
- Jackson, Malcolm (22 July 1980). "A.U.S." Woroni (a student publication at Australian National University). Canberra. p. 3.
- Knight, Linsay (2013). Australia's Greatest People & Their Achievements. Sydney: Random House. ISBN 978-0-85798-020-5.
- Loos, Noel; Mabo, Edward Koiki (1996). Edward Koiki Mabo. His Life and Struggle for Land Rights. Brisbane: University of Queensland Press. ISBN 978-0-7022-4979-2.
- McDermott, Alex (2022). Australian History for Dummies. 2nd Edition. Milton: John Wiley and Sons. ISBN 978-0-730-39545-4.
- Nakata, Prof N Martin (2016). "Re-thinking Indigenous Learning Support (Transcript of the 2016 Mabo Lecture, part of the annual Eddie Koiki Mabo Lecture Series)" (PDF). James Cook University.
- National Aboriginal Education Committee (1 December 1977). Black Community School Study. Canberra: National Aboriginal Education Committee.
- Reynolds, Henry (2022) [First published 2013]. Forgotten War. Sydney: Newsouth Publishing. ISBN 978-1742237596.
- Reynolds, Henry (2021). Truth-Telling. Sydney: Newsouth Publishing. ISBN 978-1742236940.
- Reynolds, Henry (1999). Why Weren't We Told? A Personal Search for the Truth About Our History. New York City: Penguin Random House. ISBN 978-0-14-027842-2.
- Reynolds, Margaret (1 August 1977). "Preliminary Assessment of Achievement Levels in an Ethnic Community School". The Aboriginal Child at School. 5 (4). Brisbane: Schonell Educational Research Centre, University of Queensland: 21–25. doi:10.1017/S0310582200009299.
- Reynolds, Margaret (1 August 1981). "The Black Community School in Townsville". Social Alternatives. 2 (2). Brisbane: Department of External Studies, University of Queensland: 64–68.
- Russell, Peter H. (2005). Recognizing Aboriginal Title: The Mabo Case and Indigenous Resistance to English-Settler Colonialism. Toronto: University of Toronto Press. ISBN 9780802038630.
- Smallacombe, Sonia (2000). "Review of the film "Mabo: Life of an Island Man" by Trevor Graham, Denise Haslem, Sharon Connolly". The Contemporary Pacific. 12 (1). Honolulu: University of Hawaiʻi Press: 300–302. JSTOR 23717506.
- Turnbull, Paul; Bischoff, Eva; Rodoreda, Geoff (2021). Mabo's Cultural Legacy. History, Literature, Film and Cultural Practice in Contemporary Australia. London: Anthem Press. ISBN 978-1-78527-425-1.
- Warnock, Roberta (3 June 1974). "Qld Black Community School". Tharunka. University of New South Wales. p. 12.
- Weimar, Barbara (11 February 1981). "Where is AUS Going?". Tribune. Canberra. p. 12.
- Wheatley, Nadia (2013). Australians All. A History of Growing Up from the Ice Age to the Apology. Sydney: Allen & Unwin. ISBN 978-1-74237-097-2.
- "ACC Grant to school". The Australian Church Record (1560). Sydney: Australian Church Record Ltd. 18 April 1974. JSTOR 32084458.
- "States Grants (Schools) Act 1973-1974. General Recurrent Grants to Non-Government, Non-Systemic Schools". Australian Government Gazette (G32). Canberra: Government of Australia. 19 August 1975.
