= Eddie Mabo =

Land rights activist for Indigenous Australians (1936–1992)

- Mabo c. 1980s
- Born: 29 June 1936; Mer, Torres Strait Islands, Queensland, Australia
- Died: 21 January 1992 (aged 55); Brisbane, Queensland, Australia
- Occupations: Author, educator, land rights activist
- Years active: 1959–1991
- Spouse: Bonita Mabo (m. 1959)
- Children: 10

Edward Koiki Mabo (/mɑːboʊ/ MAH-bo; né Sambo; 29 June 1936 Murray island – 21 January 1992 Brisbane) was a Torres Strait Islander man, known for his role in campaigning for Indigenous land rights in Australia, in particular the landmark decision of the High Court of Australia that recognised that indigenous rights to land had continued after the British Crown acquired sovereignty and that the international law doctrine of terra nullius was not applicable to Australian domestic law. High court judges considering the case Mabo v Queensland (No 2) found in favour of Mabo, which led to the Native Title Act 1993 and established native title in Australia, officially recognising the rights of Aboriginal and Torres Strait Islander people in Australia.

== Early life and Background ==
Eddie Mabo was born Edward Koiki Sambo on 29 June 1936 in the village of Las located on the island of Mer in the Torres Strait. His parents were Robert Zesou Sambo and Poipe Mabo, but Eddie was adopted by his uncle Benny Mabo when his mother died shortly after he was born. This adoption was part of traditional Torres Strait Islander adoption practices.

When young, Mabo was influenced by his teacher Robert 'Bob' Victor Miles, a relieving teacher with the Schools for Islanders. Miles was known as a friend of all his students; he not only taught the children of the islands but also learnt their language and encouraged them to use their own language in class. Mabo was one of these students and learnt more than just language from Miles, he also gained an understanding of 'mainland' culture. Mabo, who lived with Miles for a time while his mother was ill, later reflected on the importance of his education. That, along with his confident use of language, self-assured public speaking and understanding of mainland politics, culminated in the landmark case Mabo v Queensland in 1992.

Mabo had a great bond with his tradition. He enjoyed activities such as Aboriginal painting, dancing and singing. But his uncle and aunt, Benny and Maigo Mabo, taught him to respect other's cultures as well.

Mabo married Bonita Neehow, an Australian South Sea Islander, in 1959. The couple had seven children and adopted three more. Bonita Mabo died in Townsville on 26 November 2018, aged 75, just days after receiving an honorary doctorate of letters from James Cook University for her contributions to Indigenous rights and human rights.

One daughter, Gail Mabo (born 1966), is a successful visual artist who has had her work exhibited across Australia. Before beginning her studies in art in the 2000s, she had a career in dance, choreography, and acting. She has also worked with schools in New South Wales as a cultural advisor, and has served as the family's designated spokesperson.

Mabo's nephew was Anglican Bishop Saibo Mabo.

His great-nephew is NBA athlete Patty Mills, the third Indigenous Australian to represent the nation in Olympic basketball.

== Career ==
Mabo worked on pearling boats, as a cane cutter, and as a railway fettler (worker), becoming a gardener at James Cook University in Townsville, Queensland at age 31.

In 1973, Eddie and Bonita Mabo established the Black Community School in Townsville, where Torres Strait Islander children could learn their own culture rather than European culture.

Speaking to the State Library of Queensland for their podcast series about the Mabo decision, Eddie's daughter Gail Mabo recalled that her father particularly objected to Torres Strait Islander children being taught a version of history that did not include any Aboriginal or Torres Strait Islander voices or perspectives. She also said that Eddie Mabo believed that knowledge of their culture would give Torres Strait children growing up on the mainland a solid foundation and a sense of pride.

Noel Zaro attended the Black Community School, also known as BCS. He remembered that on a standard day, the school taught Western subjects such as English and Maths in the morning: after lunch, students would be taught about Torres Strait Islander culture, including basic Meriam language vocabulary as well as traditional dancing. Some students, including Noel Zaro, took field trips to other schools for traditional dance demonstrations, often transported by parents or family members.

As the school was not sanctioned by the Queensland education board, Mabo served unpaid as principal, cultural instructor and school bus driver. He continued to work as a gardener at James Cook University in the evenings.

The time Mabo spent on the James Cook University campus had a massive impact on his life. In 1974, he was talking with James Cook University historians Noel Loos and Henry Reynolds, and Loos recalls:

[W]e were having lunch one day in Reynolds' office when Koiki was just speaking about his land back on Mer, or Murray Island. Henry and I realised that in his mind he thought he owned that land, so we sort of glanced at each other, and then had the difficult responsibility of telling him that he didn't own that land, and that it was Crown land. Koiki was surprised, shocked and even ... he said and I remember him saying 'No way, it's not theirs, it's ours.'

Later, when Mabo was a research assistant on an oral history project in the Torres Strait, Reynolds records:

He got as far as Thursday Island and no further. He was refused permission to land on any of the other islands in the Straits. A reputation as a radical was a heavy burden in Queensland at the time. For Eddie the rejection was devastating. He could not go home. He was not only landless in the eyes of white man's law, he was an exile as well.

== Land rights advocate ==
In 1981 a land rights conference was held at James Cook University and Mabo gave a speech in which he explained the land inheritance system on Murray Island. The significance of this in terms of Australian common law doctrine was noted by one of the attendees, a lawyer, who suggested there should be a test case to claim land rights through the court system. Perth-based solicitor Greg McIntyre was at the conference and agreed to take the case; he then recruited barristers Ron Castan and Bryan Keon-Cohen. McIntyre represented Mabo during the hearings.

Of the eventual outcome of that decision a decade later, Reynolds said: "it was a ten-year battle and it was a remarkable saga really".

== Death and Mabo decision ==
On 21 January 1992, Eddie Mabo died of cancer at the age of 55.

Five months later, on 3 June 1992, the High Court announced its historic decision to recognise the land rights of Indigenous Australians. That decision, formally Mabo v Queensland (No 2), now commonly called "Mabo" in Australia, is recognised for its landmark status.

Three years after Mabo died, that being the traditional mourning period for the people of Murray Island, a memorial service was held. The next day, Mabo's gravesite was vandalized. Swastikas and racial slurs were spray-painted on his tombstone, and a bronze bas-relief portrait of Mabo was removed. His family decided to have his body reburied on Murray Island. On the night of his reinterment, the Islanders performed their traditional ceremony for the burial of a Meriam king, a ritual not seen on the island for 80 years.

== Legacy ==
In 1992, Edward Koiki Mabo was posthumously awarded the Australian Human Rights Medal in the Human Rights and Equal Opportunity Commission Awards, together with the Reverend Dave Passi, Sam Passi (deceased), James Rice (deceased), Celuia Mapo Salee (deceased) and Barbara Hocking (deceased). The award was in recognition "of their long and determined battle to gain justice for their people" and the "work over many years to gain legal recognition for indigenous people's rights".

In 1993, The Australian newspaper commemorated his work by voting him the 1992 Australian of the Year (not to be confused with the official Australian of the Year awards issued by the Australian Government).

A documentary film, Mabo: Life of an Island Man, directed by Trevor Graham, was released in 1997 and received the Australian Film Institute Award for Best Documentary.

The Eddie Koiki Mabo Lecture Series was established in his honour in 2004 at James Cook University. The lectures have been given by eminent Australians on Mabo Day, which takes place every year on 3 June, in National Reconciliation Week, in most years since then.

On 21 May 2008, James Cook University named its Townsville campus library the Eddie Koiki Mabo Library.

Mabo Day is an official holiday in the Torres Shire, celebrated on 3 June, and occurs during National Reconciliation Week in Australia.

On 10 June 2012, Mabo, a television film based on Mabo's life, was broadcast on the Australian Broadcasting Corporation (ABC).

In June 2014, the annual Eddie Mabo Award for Social Justice was created as one of three awards at the newly-established National Indigenous Human Rights Awards in Sydney, New South Wales.

On 3 June 2015, on the 23rd anniversary of the Mabo decision, a star was named Koiki after Eddie Koiki Mabo. It was named by Museum of Applied Arts and Sciences, with the naming ceremony taking place at Sydney Observatory. The star is within the Southern Cross constellation as well as the huge Torres Strait Islanders' constellation known as Tagai, which is very culturally significant and used for nautical navigation.

On 24 August 2015, Tony Abbott became the first Prime Minister of Australia to visit Mabo's grave on Murray Island, where he paid tribute to his legacy.

In 2016, Google Doodle commemorated his 80th birthday.

In 2017, the Royal Australian Mint issued a 50-cent coin commemorating 25 years since Mabo's death and the legal decision and 50 years since the referendum. It was designed by his granddaughter Boneta-Marie Mabo and released in National Reconciliation Week.

In 2022, the State Library of Queensland produced a podcast called Hi, I'm Eddie. Hosted by Rhianna Patrick, the podcast discusses the Mabo's life, the High Court case, and the enduring legacy of both.

=== Mabo Centre ===
The Mabo Centre was launched on 4 March 2025 in Perth (Boorloo). The centre is a research, training, and knowledge exchange centre created as a joint initiative between the National Native Title Council (NNTC) and the University of Melbourne, focused on native title agreements.

The centre is governed by a board of up to 11 members, comprising First Nations leaders and economic experts. The inaugural co-chairs are Jamie Lowe, CEO of the NNTC; with alternating co-chairs Marcia Langton and Paul Kofman, Dean of the Faculty of Business and Economics and Sidney Myer Chair of Commerce at the University of Melbourne. Eddie Cubillo, professor and lawyer with extensive experience, is the inaugural director. Rio Tinto is founding partner of the centre.

=== SLQ collections ===
The State Library of Queensland holds several significant collections relating to the Mabo decision and the Mabo family, including:

- OM95-26 Mabo Cutting Books – these books contain newspaper clippings relating to the Mabo case between November 1990 and October 1994
- 29122 Album of Photographs Relating to the Mabo Case on Mer Island 1989 – a photographic account of the proceedings of the Mabo case on Mer (Murray Island)
- 6837 Justice Moynihan – Determination re Mabo Case Papers 27 Feb 1986 – three bound volumes regarding the determination of a reference from the High Court of Australia of the factual issues raised in the action by Eddie Mabo and others, prepared by Justice Moynihan.
- 32825 Mabo family collection – Includes a collection of shirts worn by and commemorating Eddie Mabo, many made by his wife Dr. Bonita Mabo AO for the extended family. Other significant items include the annotated Mabo family copy of Margaret Lawrie's Myths and legends of the Torres Strait.

== See also ==
- Mabo v Queensland (No 1)
- Mabo v Queensland (No 2)
- Native title in Australia
- Mabo (TV film)
- List of Indigenous Australian historical figures
