= Bonita Mabo =

Australian activist (1943–2018)

Bonita Mabo AO
- Born: Ernestine Bonita Nehow c.7th April 1943; Halifax, Queensland, Australia
- Died: 26 November 2018 (aged 75); Brisbane, Queensland, Australia
- Spouse: Eddie Mabo (m. 1959; died 1992)

Ernestine Bonita Mabo AO (née Nehow; c. 1943 – 26 November 2018), was an Australian educator and activist for Indigenous Australians and Australian South Sea Islanders (ASSIs). She was the wife of Eddie Mabo until his death in 1992.

== Early life ==
Ernestine Bonita Nehow was born in Halifax, Queensland, one of 10 children. She was a South Sea Islander of Ni-Vanuatu descent whose ancestors were "blackbirded" to work in the sugar cane industry in Queensland. Her grandfather was blackbirded from Tanna Island in what is now Vanuatu.

== Career ==
In 1973, Eddie and Bonita Mabo established the Black Community School in Townsville, where children could learn their own culture rather than white culture. Bonita worked in the school as a teacher's aide and oversaw day-to-day operations.

Mabo was an Indigenous rights activist for Indigenous Australians and a civil rights activist for South Sea Islanders.

== Honours ==
Mabo was appointed an Officer of the Order of Australia on Australia Day (26 January) 2013, "For distinguished service to the Indigenous community and to human rights as an advocate for the Aboriginal, Torres Strait Islander and South Sea Islander peoples".

On 31 May 2018, a star was named in her honour at the Sydney Observatory, during the visit of the N.S.W. Judicial Commission's Ngara Yura Program to the Observatory. Her daughter, artist Gail Mabo, was present, since Bonita was ill. Another star, Koiki, had been named in memory of Eddie Koiki Mabo in 2015 on the 23rd anniversary of the Mabo decision.

On 17 November 2018, James Cook University conferred upon Bonita Mabo an Honorary Doctorate of Letters in recognition of her outstanding contribution to social justice and human rights at a private ceremony held in Brisbane.

== Death ==
Bonita Mabo died in Brisbane on 26 November 2018, aged 75.

A statement by the Australian South Sea Islander Alliance of which Bonita Mabo was honorary patron described her as someone who would be greatly missed, saying:

"Aunty Bonita's contribution to social justice and human rights for First Nations People and the Australian South Sea Islander recognition was monumental and relentless."

== Media portrayals ==
In the 2012 television film Mabo, Deborah Mailman played the role of Bonita Mabo, opposite Jimi Bani who played her husband Eddie Mabo.
