= Gail Mabo =

Torres Strait Islander artist and dancer (born 1965)

- Born: 1965 (age 60–61); Queensland, Australia
- Parents: Eddie Mabo (father); Bonita Mabo (mother)

Gail Mabo (born 1965) is a Torres Strait Islander visual artist who has had her work exhibited across Australia. She is the daughter of land rights campaigner Eddie Mabo and educator and activist Bonita Mabo. She was formerly a dancer and choreographer.

== Early life and education ==
Mabo was born in 1965, the daughter of Eddie and Bonita Mabo. She is of the Piadram language group and clan of Mer (Murray Island), an island that is part of Queensland, Australia.

She attended the Black Community School in Townsville, the first school for Aboriginal and Torres Strait Islander children, which had been opened by her father.

== Arts education ==
Mabo attended Kingscliff TAFE in Sydney from 1998 to 2003, and from 2004 went to the Barrier Reef Institute of TAFE in North Queensland, achieving a Certificate IV in Visual Arts in 2005, followed by a Diploma of Visual Arts in 2007.

She studied dance at the Aboriginal Islander Dance Theatre in Sydney from 1984 to 1987.

== Career ==
=== Performing arts ===
Before beginning her studies in art, Mabo had a career in dance, choreography, and acting.

Her performing credits include Tracey Moffat's short films Nice Coloured Girls (actor) and Watch Out (dancer and choreographer), and the 1991 Sydney production of Jimmy Chi's Bran Nue Dae.

In 2005 she directed Koiki, a stage performance based on the life of her father.

=== Visual art ===
Her work has since been exhibited in institutions across the country in both solo and group exhibitions. She is a founding member of the Murris in Ink artist collective, a group of Aboriginal and Torres Strait Islander artists in North Queensland.

In 2014, Mabo was commissioned to create two huge murals at the James Cook University's Singapore campus, using linocut printing. In 2017, she was the featured artist at the Cairns Indigenous Art Fair, and her work honouring her father and her Mer home was bought by the National Gallery of Victoria, and earned an Innovation Award.

During 2017 and 2018, she co-curated Legacy: Reflections on Mabo, an exhibition that was mounted in Townsville in 2019, followed by a four-year tour across the country.

In the 2021–2022 Tarnanthi exhibition at the Art Gallery of South Australia, her sculpture named Tagai, constructed of bamboo sticks and string and a representation of the Southern Cross, was mounted on a wall. it is based on the story of Tagai, which is part of Torres Strait Islanders' tradition al belief system, and passed down through the generations. It is important for navigation, and seen as a man in the constellation of the Southern Cross, with his left hand pointing south.

Her interactive 2021 exhibition, House of Cards, was held at the Umbrella gallery in Townsville, and explored Mabo's home, memories and family relationships.

Mabo has been experimenting with cast bronze, empowered by her 2021 residency at Urban Art Projects.

== Other roles ==
She has also worked with schools in New South Wales as a cultural advisor, and is known as a public speaker, often serving as the family's designated spokesperson.

== Personal life ==
Mabo is the mother of triplets.

== Collections ==
Mabo's work is held by a number of public and private collections, including:

- Artbank - Australia-wide
- Art Gallery of South Australia, Adelaide
- Art Gallery of New South Wales, Sydney
- Australian High Commission, Singapore
- Australian Trade Commission, Singapore
- Australian Maritime Museum, Sydney
- Central Queensland University Collection – Queensland
- James Cook University Collection, Townsville, Singapore and Cairns
- Museum and Art Gallery of the Northern Territory, Darwin
- National Gallery of Victoria
- National Gallery of Australia, Canberra
- QAGOMA, Brisbane
- State Library of Queensland
- Townsville City Council
- University of Western Sydney
