= National Aboriginal and Torres Strait Islander Education Policy =

Education policy in Australia

The Australian National Aboriginal and Torres Strait Islander Education Policy (AEP) is a national policy adopted by the Government of Australia by each State and Territory government. The policy was first introduced in 1989 and is the foundation of education programs for all Indigenous Australians.

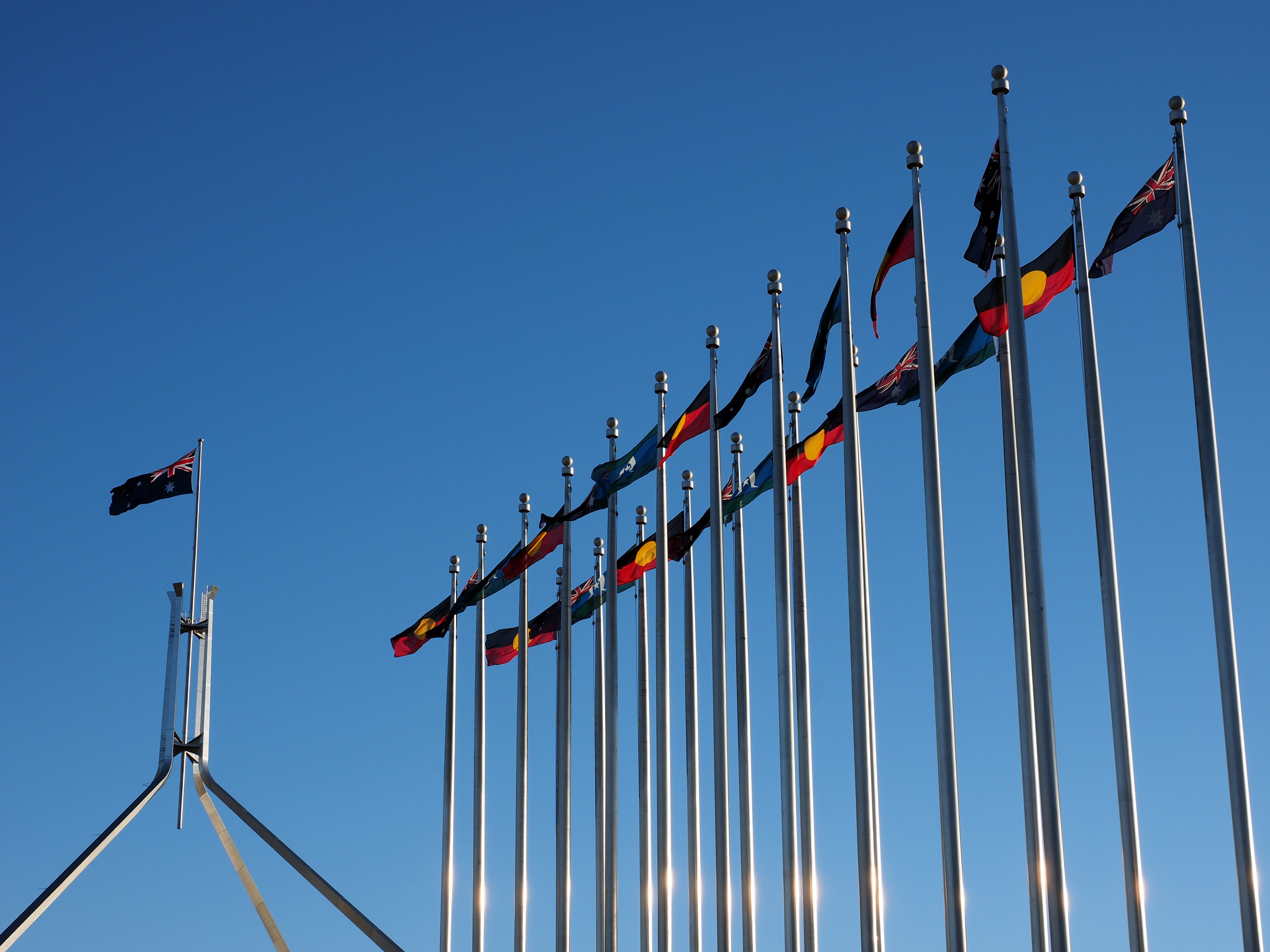
Aboriginal, Torres Strait Islander and Australian flags outside the Australian Parliament House, 2016.

== History ==
The National Aboriginal and Torres Strait Islander Education Policy has been redeveloped and reimagined since 1982, with the first Aboriginal Education Policy focusing on the appreciation of Aboriginal cultures and societies.

In 1988, a Commonwealth Government Task Force informed the development of the National Aboriginal Education Policy (AEP), launching the policy in 1989. The policy was officially actioned in 1990, with endorsement by the Commonwealth, State and Territory governments.

The policy was a response to the Ministerial Council for Education, Employment and Training and Youth Affairs (MCEETYA) recognition of the need to improve educational outcomes for Aboriginal and Torres Strait Islander students. In 1995, the MCEETYA meeting reestablished numerous priority areas for Aboriginal Australians education. The commonwealth supported the performance targets established by the MCEETYA, which included:

- Culturally inclusive education
- Attendance
- Retention rates
- Completion rates

In 1993, a national review indicated that several areas of Aboriginal and Torres Strait Islander students education had been improved. The areas of improvement included participation and outcomes for education and training. However, the review noted that improvements were inconsistent across states and territories.

In 1996, the Aboriginal Education Policy (AEP) had three main focus areas. Which included:

- Aboriginal students

- Aboriginal communities

- All staff, students and schools A review of the policy was conducted in 2003 by the NSW Government for the effectiveness of the Aboriginal education and training for Aboriginal students in NSW. This led to a new partnership with the NSW AECG Inc, in order to ensure the implementation of the policy in NSW. In 2006–2008, the Aboriginal Education Policy has been actioned within the Aboriginal Education and Training Strategy.

== Indigenous Education (Targeted Assistance) Act 2000 ==
The National Aboriginal and Torres Strait Islander education policy is associated with the Indigenous Education (Targeted Assistance) Act 2000. The act enables agreements to be made between education providers and other persons or bodies for the purpose of assisted payments, i.e. ABSTUDY. Education providers may include the state or territory; university or post-secondary education institution; person or body conducting an educational system; and/or a person qualified to conduct research on education. The legislation outlines several aims for achieving equitable and appropriate educational outcomes for Indigenous people. These can be summarised through preschool education; compulsory attendance; equitability measures to ensure fair outcomes amongst students; equity in graduation rates; continuation of Indigenous languages in education contexts; initiatives to increase numeracy and literacy levels; and education that explores the culture of Indigenous people.

== Goals of AEP ==
In 1989, several goals were established by the AEP in achieving the objectives of the policy. These include twenty one long-term goals based around achieving equitable outcomes for Aboriginal and Torres Strait Islander people.

In 1991, the Report of the Royal Commission into Aboriginal Deaths in Custody emphasised the importance of the National Aboriginal and Torres Strait Islander Education Policy as a way of ensuring greater control over educational institutions and services. The report outlines the inadequacies of the formal education system in creating equitable foundations for Aboriginal Australians educational outcomes. The report noted that, education and training factors to the disproportionate overrepresentation of Aboriginal and Torres Strait Islander Australians in custody.

There are four overarching goals of the AEP, which are legislated under the Indigenous Education (Targeted Assistance) Act 2000, No. 147, 2000. These goals are:

- Involvement of Aboriginal and Torres Strait Islander people in educational decision-making
- Equality of access to education services
- Equity of educational participation
- Equitable and appropriate educational outcomes

The goals were endorsed by The Commonwealth of Australia, The State of New South Wales, The State of Queensland, The State of South Australia, The State of Tasmania, The State of Victoria, The State of Western Australia, Australian Capital Territory, and Northern Territory.

=== Major Goals ===
==== Involvement of Aboriginal and Torres Strait Islander People in Educational Decision Making ====
1. Enhancing participation of Aboriginal and Torres Strait Islander community in the planning, delivery and evaluation of schooling services for their children
2. Increasing the number of educational administrators, teachers, curriculum advisors, etc. that identify as Aboriginal and Torres Strait Islander
3. Increasing the participation of Aboriginal and Torres Strait Islander students in the planning, delivery and evaluation of schooling services and institutions
4. Increasing the number of Aboriginal and Torres Strait Islander people employed in education positions.
5. Developing the skills of Aboriginal and Torres Strait Islander through education and training services in order to participate in educational decision making
6. Developing arrangements to engage with independent advisors from Aboriginal and Torres Strait Islander communities on educational decisions at regional, state, territory and national levels

==== Equality of Access to Education Services ====
7. Ensuring Aboriginal and Torres Strait Islander children have access to the same pre-school services as other Australian children of the same age
8. Ensuring all Aboriginal and Torres Strait Islander children have local access to primary and secondary education
9. Ensuring equitable access for Aboriginal and Torres Strait Islander people for post-compulsory secondary schooling

==== Equity of Educational Participation ====
10. Achieving similar participation rates of Aboriginal and Torres Strait Islander children in pre-school education with other Australians.
11. Achieving the participation of all Aboriginal and Torres Strait children in compulsory schooling
12. Achieving the participation of Aboriginal and Torres Strait islander people in post-compulsory secondary education at rates comparable with all Australians in education sectors.

==== Equitable and Appropriate Educational Outcomes ====
13. Providing adequate preparation for Aboriginal and Torres Strait Islander children throughout their education
14. Enabling Aboriginal and Torres Strait Islander students to attain the same standard of skills as other Australians throughout their education
15. Enabling Aboriginal and Torres Strait Islander students to complete Year 12 or equivalent education at the same rates as other Australian students
16. Enabling Aboriginal and Torres Strait Islander students to attain the same graduation rates in technical, further education and higher education institutions as other Australians.
17. Developing programs to support the appreciation and continued use of Aboriginal languages
18. Providing community education services to enable Aboriginal and Torres Strait Islander people the skills to manage the development of their communities
19. Enabling proficiency in English language and numeracy competency by Aboriginal adults with limited education experience
20. Enabling Aboriginal students to have an appreciation of their history, cultures and identity at all levels of education
21. Providing all Australian students with an understanding of and respect for Aboriginal and Torres Strait Islander traditional and contemporary cultures.

== Programs implemented ==
Between 2005 and 2009, several programs have been funded under the Indigenous Education Program, including:

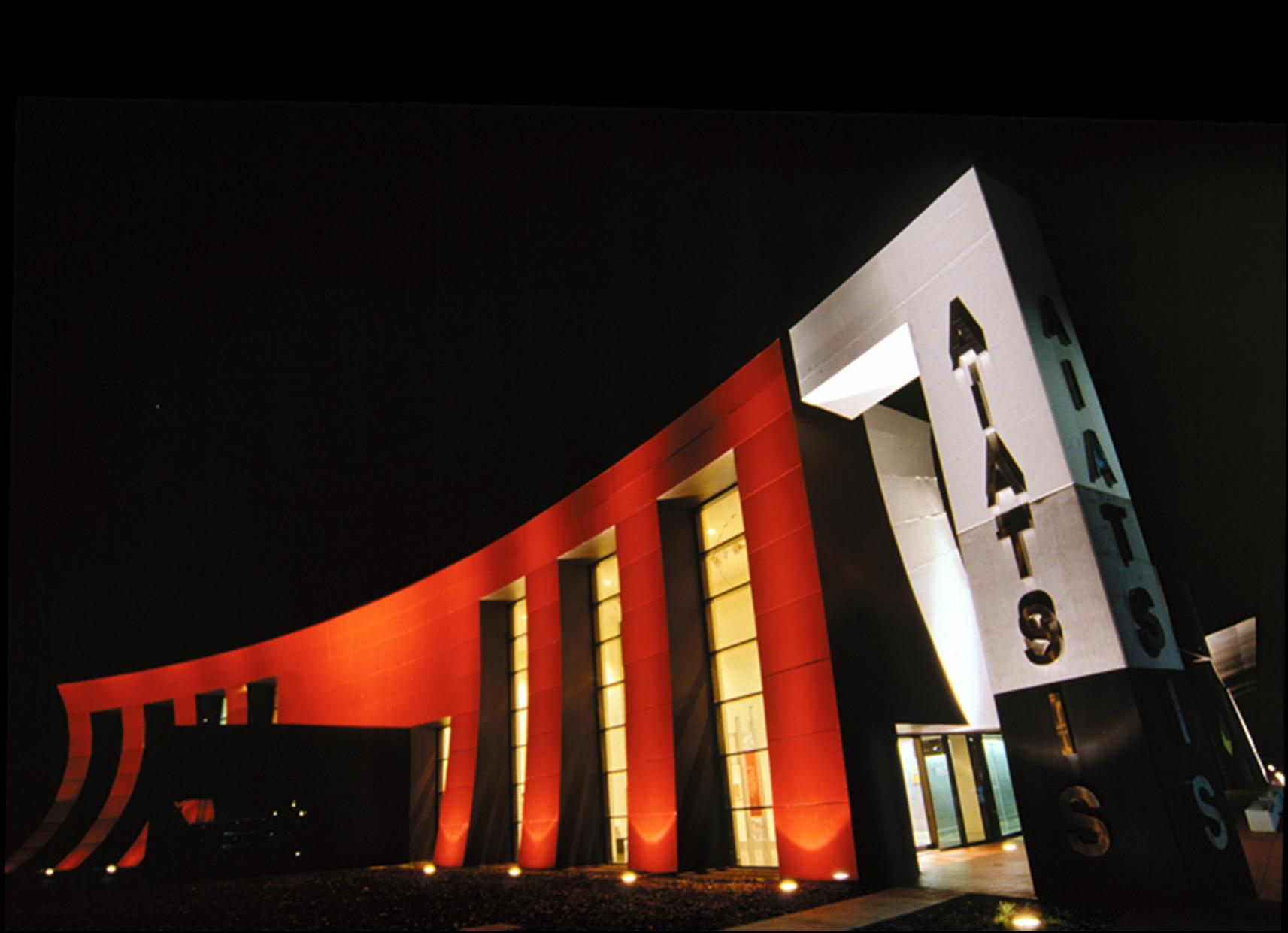
Australian Institute of Aboriginal and Torres Strait Islander Studies Building (AIATS).

=== Supplementary Recurrent Assistance (SRA); ===
The Indigenous Education (Targeted Assistance) Act 2000, No. 147, 2000 mandated SRA payments through the Indigenous Supplementary Assistance (ISA) organisation in 2009. In 2020, the Northern Territory Government committed to SRA payments for public vocational education providers. The financial resources are allocated based on Aboriginal and Torres Strait islander student numbers. The SRA payments aim to improve the following areas for First Nation students:

- Literacy
- Numeracy
- Employment of Aboriginal and Torres Strait Islander students in education and training sectors
- Educational outcomes
- Enrolments
- Involvement of family and community members agency in educational decision making
- Culturally inclusive education

The payments are aimed to be supplementary to funding currently in place. The SRA funding is available for Charles Darwin University and Bachelor Institute of Indigenous Tertiary Education students.

=== Indigenous Tutorial Assistance Scheme (ITAS) ===
The Indigenous Tutorial Assistance Scheme-Tertiary Tuition (ITAS-TT) was established in 1989, emerging from the National Aboriginal and Torres Strait Islander Education Policy. ITAS-TT provided funding to support study for Aboriginal and Torres Strait Islander students. In 2016–2017, the Australian government renamed the ITAS-TT program to the Indigenous Tutorial Assistance Scheme (ITAS)

=== Whole of School Initiatives (WoSI) ===
The former governing body of the Whole of School Initiatives (WoSI) was the Australian Government Department of Education, Science and Training (DEST). The Department of Education, Employment and Workplace Relations (DEEWR) replaced the former body in funding the WoSI program.

The WoSI operates through the Parent School Partnership Initiative and Homework Centres, in increasing opportunities for First Nation peoples education.

In 2007, various proposals were funded in ACT, including Melba High School cluster homework centre, the Koori Preschool programs in Calwell and Wanniassa and the Black Mountain School cultural program.

=== Away-from-base for mixed-mode delivery (AFB) ===
The away-from-base for mixed-mode delivery (AFB) program provides increased access to educational opportunities for Indigenous Australians, particularly in rural and remote areas. AFB supports Indigenous students to study compulsory course requirements in another location away from home. AFB assists students through travel costs, meals and accommodation

In 2018, the two AFB programs on offer included ABSTUDY AFB assistance and PM&C’S AFB assistance. ABSTUDY assistance is administered by the Department of Human Services (DHS) and the Department of Social Security (DSS). The program supports students through their secondary education and VET courses. The PM&C's AFB provides financial support to eligible non-for-profit training providers and universities on an average funding rate per full-time equivalent student.

=== English as a Second Language for Indigenous Language Speaking Students (ESL-ILSS); ===
The Far North Queensland Indigenous Schooling Support Unit (FNQ ISSU) govern operations for individuals in the ESL-ILSS program. Through the FNQ ISSU organisation, individuals in the ESL-ISS program had access to funding that bridged language gaps in formal education systems. FNQ ISSU acknowledge that “Aboriginal and Torres Strait Islander students in their first year of formal schooling have been assessed as having a language barrier… prevent[ing] them from effective participation in the classroom in English” [paraphrased]

Students are eligible for support if they meet the following criteria:

- Speak an indigenous language
- Assessed using indigenous Band scales as having “pre-level 2” or below in speaking ability
- Commenced formal schooling for the first time
- Have not previously received an ESL-ISS payment

=== Indigenous Youth Leadership Program (IYLP) ===
The Indigenous Youth Leadership Program (IYLP) is funded by the Australian Government. IYLP assists Indigenous youth in attaining their education goals through scholarships and leadership opportunities. The Smith Family and Wilderness School work collaboratively in granting scholarship opportunities for potential students to be eligible for the IYLP.

=== Indigenous Youth Mobility Program (IYMP) ===
The Indigenous Youth Mobility Program (IYMP) assist young Indigenous Australians living in remote locations with their post-secondary education. The National Indigenous Australians Agency (NIAA) fund the IYMP program. In 2019 there were 249 participants nation-wide, with 216 of those completing higher education.

IYMP assist Indigenous students through adhering to the barriers that hinder accessibility to education and employment for First Nation students living in remote locations. In 2019, there were 144 communities across the nation that IYMP provided support for, with 90% of participants being from remote regions.

IYMP have various objectives aimed towards bridging the gap in education barriers for students living remotely. This includes:

- Improving accessibility to employment and training centres
- Increasing opportunities for accredited training
- Increase employment of Indigenous people in occupations of community need
- Supporting the economic development of rural communities through engaging students with the skills to participate effectively in their community through formal employment

== National Aboriginal and Torres Strait Islander Education Strategy 2015 ==
The National Aboriginal and Torres Strait Islander Education Strategy 2015 builds on previous action plans for improving education for Australian First Nation students. The education strategy has a variety of principles, establishing the yardstick for education systems and providers to measure their approaches to inclusive education. This includes:

- Increasing the potential for Aboriginal and Torres Strait Islander students to succeed
- Establishing equity through accessing the same educational opportunities and outcomes as other Australians
- Accountability and transparency of education providers
- Cultural recognition and respect of Aboriginal and Torres Strait Islander people's histories, values and languages
- Relationships that value community culture and knowledge
- Local approaches in the community
- Quality education that is inclusive of the needs of Aboriginal and Torres Strait Islander students

There are seven priority areas for Aboriginal and Torres Strait Islander education. These priority areas include leadership, quality teaching, workforce development culture and identity; partnerships; school and child readiness; transition points for post-school life; literacy and numeracy; and attendance.

== National Report to Parliament on Indigenous Education and Training ==
A major report, the National Report to Parliament on Indigenous Education and Training was presented to the Parliament of Australia in 2003. Since 2003, research has identified complexities and challenges in meeting these goals. For example, Euro-centric educational materials may hamper equality of educational participation and outcomes of First Nation people.

== See also ==
- Black Community School, Townsville, a school which lasted from 1973-1985 in Townsville, Queensland, and aimed to provide a program better suited to Aboriginal and Torres Strait Islander children's needs
