= National Aboriginal Education Committee =

Education organisation

The National Aboriginal Education Committee (NAEC) was an organisation which existed from March 1977 to 1989. It served Aboriginal and Torres Strait Islander people in the field of education and learning. The committee challenged racism and bigotry towards ethnic minorities in Australian education, which during the 1970s could be ejected from classrooms at the request of white parents.

Famous members of the committee included May O'Brien who became "the first Aboriginal teacher in Western Australia". The first chairman of the committee was musician Stephen Albert.
