= Mabo v Queensland (No 2) =

1992 High Court of Australia decision which recognised native title

- Court: High Court of Australia
- Full case name: Mabo and Others and The State of Queensland [No. 2]
- Argued: 28–31 May 1991
- Decided: 3 June 1992
- Citations: [1992] HCA 23, (1992) 175 CLR 1
- Transcripts: 28 May 1991; 29 May 1991; 30 May 1991; 31 May 1991; 3 June 1992; 8 December 1992

Case history
- Prior actions: Mabo v Queensland (No 1) [1988] HCA 69, (1988) 166 CLR 186

Court membership
- Judges sitting: Chief Justice Anthony Mason; Justice Gerard Brennan; Justice William Deane; Justice Daryl Dawson; Justice John Toohey; Justice Mary Gaudron; Justice Michael McHugh

Case opinions
- Native title exists and is recognised at common law in Australia (by Mason, Brennan, Deane, Toohey, Gaudron and McHugh; Dawson dissenting)

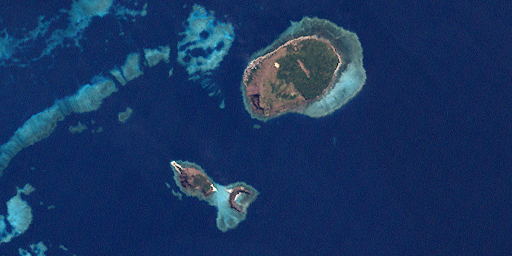
The Murray Islands

Mabo v Queensland (No 2) (commonly known as the Mabo case or simply Mabo; /mɑːboʊ/ MAH-bo) is a landmark decision of the High Court of Australia that recognised the existence of Native Title in Australia. It was brought by Eddie Mabo and others against the State of Queensland, and decided on 3 June 1992. The case was the first in Australia to recognise pre-colonial land interests of Indigenous Australians within the common law of Australia.

Mabo is of great legal, historical, and political importance to Aboriginal and Torres Strait Islander Australians. The decision rejected the notion that Australia was terra nullius (i.e. owned by no one) at the time of British settlement, and recognised that Indigenous rights to land existed by virtue of traditional customs and laws and these rights had not been wholly lost upon colonisation.

The Prime Minister Paul Keating during his Redfern speech praised the decision, saying it "establishes a fundamental truth, and lays the basis for justice". Conversely, the decision was criticised by the government of Western Australia and various mining and pastoralist groups.

Soon after the decision, the Keating government passed the Native Title Act 1993 (Cth), which supplemented the rights recognised in Mabo and set out a new process for applicants to have their rights recognised through the newly established Native Title Tribunal and the Federal Court of Australia.

== Background ==
=== History of Mer ===
The case centred on the Murray Islands Group, consisting of Murray Island (known traditionally as Mer Island), Waua Islet and Daua Island. The islands have been inhabited by the Meriam people (a group of Torres Strait Islanders) for between 300 and 2,000 years.

Prior to and after annexation by the British, rights to land on Mer are governed by Malo's Law, "a set of religiously sanctioned laws which Merriam people feel bound to observe". Under this law, the entirety of Mer is owned by different Meriam land owners and there is no concept of public ownership. Land is owned by the eldest son on behalf of a particular lineage or family so that land is jointly owned individually and communally. Unlike western law, title to land is orally based, although there is also a written tradition introduced to comply with State and Commonwealth inheritance and welfare laws. However, ownership is not 'one way' under this system of law, and an individual both owns the land and is owned by it. As such, they have the responsibility to care for and share it with their clan or family and maintain it for future generations.

In 1871, missionaries from the London Missionary Society arrived on the Torres Strait island of Darnley Island in an event known as "The coming of the Light" leading to the conversion to Christianity of much of the Torres Strait, including Mer Island. This however did not lead to a replacement of traditional native traditions, but a synthesis with traditional customs, including Malo's Law, being recognised within the framework of Christianity. Reverend David Passi, who gave evidence in the trial, explained that he believed that God had sent Malo to Mer Island and that "Jesus Christ was where Malo was pointing".

In 1879, the islands were formally annexed by the Colony (now the State) of Queensland.

By the 1900s, the traditional economic life of the Torres Strait gave way to wage labouring on fishing boats mostly owned by others. In the aftermath of the Great Depression and a subsequent cut in wages, Islanders in 1936 joined a strike instigated by Mer Islanders. This strike was the first organised Islander challenge to western authorities since colonisation.

=== Legal background ===
Prior to Mabo, the pre-colonial property interests of Indigenous Australians were not recognised by the Australian legal system. Litigation over this issue directly did not arise until the 1970s with the case of Milirrpum v Nabalco Pty Ltd. In that case, native title was held to not exist and to never have existed in Australia.

Later, in 1982, the plaintiffs, headed by Eddie Mabo, represented by barrister Ron Castan, and advised by law firm Arnold Bloch Leibler, requested a declaration from the High Court that the Meriam people were entitled to property rights on Murray Island according to their local customs, original native ownership and their actual use and possession of the land. The State of Queensland was the respondent to the proceeding and argued that native title had never existed in Australia and, even if it had, it had been removed (at the latest) by the Land Act 1910 (Qld).

Prior to judgment, the Queensland government passed the Queensland Coast Islands Declaratory Act 1985 (Qld), which purported to extinguish the native title on the Murray Islands that Mabo and the other plaintiffs were seeking to claim. This was successfully challenged in Mabo v Queensland (1988) 166 CLR 186 (Mabo No 1) and declared as ineffective due to the act being inconsistent with the right to equality before the law, as established by the Racial Discrimination Act 1975 (Cth).

== Judgment ==
The court held that rights arising under native title were recognised within Australia's common law. These rights were sourced from Indigenous laws and customs and not from a grant from the Crown. However, these rights may be extinguished by State or Commonwealth legislation or by grants of land rights inconsistent with native title rights. Additionally, the acquisition of radical title to land by the Crown at British settlement did not by itself extinguish native title interests.

A majority of the High Court found that:

- The doctrine of terra nullius was not applicable to Australia at the time of British settlement of New South Wales
- The Crown acquires radical title to land when it acquires sovereignty over it
- Native title exists as part of the common law of Australia
- The source of native title was the traditional customs and laws of Indigenous groups
- The nature and content of native title rights depended upon ongoing traditional laws and customs
- Native title could be extinguished by a valid exercise of government power that was inconsistent with an ongoing native title interest.

=== Terra nullius ===
Various members of the court discussed the international law doctrine of terra nullius ('no one's land'), meaning uninhabited or inhabited territory which is not under the jurisdiction of a state, and which can be acquired by a state through occupation. The court also discussed the analogous common law doctrine that "desert and uncultivated land" which includes land "without settled inhabitants or settled law" can be acquired by Britain by settlement, and that the laws of England are transmitted at settlement. A majority of the court rejected the notion that the doctrine of terra nullius precluded the common law recognition of traditional Indigenous rights and interests in land at the time of British settlement of New South Wales.

In 2005, historian Michael Connor argued in The Invention of Terra Nullius that Mabo was wrongly decided as the British actually annexed Australia, rather than treating it as terra nullius. Responding to these criticisms, Mason stated, "what the British thought about its international law grounds for establishing sovereignty over Australia, for annexing Australia, is beside the point" with the decision actually concerned with answering the question, "does the common law (as applied in the Australian colonies) exclude altogether the rights of the indigenous people so that forever the rights they formerly had are excluded?"

== Significance ==
The case attracted widespread controversy and public debate. The prime minister, Paul Keating, praised the decision in his Redfern Speech, saying that it "establishes a fundamental truth, and lays the basis for justice". Richard Court, the premier of Western Australia, voiced opposition to the decision in comments echoed by various mining and pastoralist interest groups.

=== Development of native title ===
The decision established the legal doctrine of native title, enabling further litigation for Indigenous land rights. Native title doctrine was eventually supplemented in statute by the Keating government in the Native Title Act 1993 (Cth).

The recognition of native title by the decision gave rise to many significant legal questions. These included questions as to the validity of titles issued which were subject to the Racial Discrimination Act 1975 (Cth), the permissibility of future development of land affected by native title, and procedures for determining whether native title existed in land.

In response to the judgment the Keating government enacted the Native Title Act 1993 (Cth), which established the National Native Title Tribunal to hear native title claims at first instance. The act was subsequently amended by the Howard government in response to the Wik decision.

=== Legal definition of an "Indigenous person" ===
Within his judgment, Justice Brennan endorsed a three-part legal test to legally recognise a person as Indigenous in relation to native title. He wrote:

Membership of the indigenous people depends on biological descent from the indigenous people and on mutual recognition of a particular person's membership by that person and by the elders or other persons enjoying traditional authority among those people.

This definition was originally proposed and used by the Commonwealth Department of Aboriginal Affairs in the 1980s. This test has been used in later cases and in other legal contexts (including Love v Commonwealth) to establish whether or not a person is Indigenous.

== Aftermath ==
Ten years following the Mabo decision, his wife Bonita Mabo claimed that issues remained within the community about land on Mer.

On 1 February 2014, the traditional owners of land on Badu Island received freehold title to 9,836 hectares (24,310 acres) in an act of the Queensland Government. An Indigenous land use agreement was signed on 7 July 2014.

== Legacy ==
Mabo Day is an official holiday in the Torres Shire, celebrated on 3 June, and occurs during National Reconciliation Week in Australia.

The case was referenced in the 1997 comedy The Castle, as an icon of legal rightness, embodied in the quote: "In summing up, it’s the Constitution, it’s Mabo, it’s justice, it’s law, it’s the vibe."

In 2009, as part of the Q150 celebrations, the Mabo High Court of Australia decision was announced as one of the Q150 Icons of Queensland for its role as a "Defining Moment".

A straight-to-TV film titled Mabo was produced in 2012 by Blackfella Films in association with the ABC and SBS. It provided a dramatised account of the case, focusing on the effect it had on Mabo and his family.

== See also ==
- Native title in Australia
- Aboriginal title
- Indigenous land rights in Australia
- History of Indigenous Australians
- List of Australian Native Title court cases
- Delgamuukw v British Columbia
- Love v Commonwealth
- Milirrpum v Nabalco Pty Ltd
- Mabo v Queensland (No 1)
- Native Title Act 1993
- Wik Peoples v Queensland
- Yorta Yorta v Victoria
- Land tenure
- Allodial title
