= Akiba v Commonwealth =

Judgement of the High Court of Australia

- Court: High Court of Australia
- Full case name: Akiba on behalf of the Torres Strait Regional Seas Claim Group v Commonwealth of Australia
- Decided: 7 August 2013
- Citations: [2013] HCA 33, (2013) 250 CLR 209

Case history
- Prior actions: Akiba v State of Queensland (No 2) [2010] FCA 643; The Commonwealth v Akiba [2012] FCAFC 25, (2012) 204 FCR 260

Court membership
- Judges sitting: French CJ, Hayne, Crennan, Kiefel and Bell JJ

Akiba on behalf of the Torres Strait Regional Seas Claim Group v Commonwealth of Australia [2013] HCA 33; 250 CLR 209 (7 August 2013) is a landmark Australian judgment of the High Court. The matter related to Native title rights, their extension to other persons and their extinguishment by Statute.

== Facts ==
A group of Torres Strait Islanders, (the Claim Group) applied to the Federal Court seeking a determination that they had native title rights and interests in a major part of the sea area of Torres Strait, including a right to fish for sale and trade. This was opposed by the Commonwealth and Queensland State Governments who argued that, based on the decision in Western Australia v Ward, that native title was a bundle of rights that were subservient to statute and that successive generations of fishing regulations over the subject waters from the 1850s, had required fishing licenses and so had caused extinguishment of some of these native title rights specifically the right to fish for sale and trade.

The Claim Group argued that it was never the intention of the Government to extinguish native title. They argued that fishing licensing did not prohibit but merely regulated commercial fishing. Indeed, a number of government schemes had been enacted to assist Torres Strait Islanders in setting up fishing enterprises.

Finn J held that the Claim Group had for the most part, established their native title.

The Commonwealth appealed to a Full Court of the Federal Court. A majority, Keane CJ and Dowsett J, allowed part of the appeal, holding that the native title rights did not include the right to fish for sale or trade. Mansfield J dissented.

The Claim Group appealed to the High Court of Australia.

== Judgment ==
In a unanimous decision handed down in two judgments the High Court found for the Claim Group. Taking a lead from cases like Yanner v Eaton, and the Commonwealth v Yarmirr the High Court held that The Commonwealth Fisheries Act 1952 and the Queensland Fisheries Act 1887, which both required licensing of fishing activates, did not extinguish the relationship of the people to the land nor extinguish the native title bundle of rights. The first of the two judgments, by French CJ and Crennan J held a test as that asked:

- if the native title right being used cannot be exercised without abrogating the statutory right, "then by necessary implication, the statute extinguishes the existing right." but also found that "that a particular use of a native title right can be restricted or prohibited by legislation without that right or interest itself being extinguished.

The second judgment handed down by Bell, Kiefel and Hayne JJ arrived at the same result as the primary Judgment, however, they posited that it was not the subjective thinking of the lawmakers (i.e. intending to extinguish native title rights) that was important but rather the issue of inconsistency between the statute and the native title rights. The test they asked was:

- "whether the activity which constitutes the relevant incident of native title is consistent with competent legislation relating to that activity"

In answering this the judgment found that there was a native title right to take fish. The purpose for taking the fish was not at issue, and that shift of focus, from right to activity, led to error in this matter by the lower court. They also found that the statutes regulated but did not extinguish the Native title rights

=== Extension of Native title rights ===
A number of third parties brought a cross claim in this matter. These were people who had familial and clan relationship and hereditary trading relationships with the native title holders, and they were seeking recognition of their rights. The court rejected this cross claim noting that although these relationships under Islander law and culture were very real and strong these were "reciprocal rights as rights of a personal character dependent upon status and not rights in relation to the waters" itself.

== See also ==
- List of Australian Native Title court cases
