= Mabo v Queensland =

Mabo v Queensland may refer to:

- Mabo v Queensland (No 1), decided 8 December 1988, overturned the Queensland Coast Islands Declaratory Act 1985 as incompatible with the Racial Discrimination Act 1975
- Mabo v Queensland (No 2), decided 3 June 1992, the more famous case that established a common law precedent for native title
