= Queensland Coast Islands Declaratory Act 1985 =

Former Queensland legislation

Parliament of Queensland
- Long title: An Act to allay any doubts that may exist concerning certain islands forming part of Queensland
- Citation: Queensland Coast Islands Declaratory Act 1985
- Enacted: 15 April 1985

Related legislation
- Racial Discrimination Act 1975
- Status: Struck down

The Queensland Coast Islands Declaratory Act 1985 was an act of the Parliament of Queensland, the intent of which was to retroactively abolish native title claims by Torres Strait Islanders to islands off the coast of Queensland, specifically Murray Island. It was passed in response to court proceedings started by the Torres Strait Meriam people led by Eddie Mabo, who were attempting to have their land claims recognised by the common law. The act was condemned by supporters of the Indigenous Australian civil rights movement. The act was overturned in the 1988 Mabo v Queensland (No 1) High Court case, which found it inconsistent with the Racial Discrimination Act 1975.
