= Mabo v Queensland (No 1) =

Judgement of the High Court of Australia

- Court: High Court of Australia
- Full case name: Mabo and Another v The State of Queensland and Another
- Decided: 8 December 1988
- Citations: [1988] HCA 69, (1988) 166 CLR 186

Case history
- Subsequent actions: Mabo v Queensland (No 2) [1992] HCA 23, (1992) 175 CLR 1

Court membership
- Judges sitting: Mason CJ, Wilson, Brennan, Deane, Dawson, Toohey & Gaudron JJ

Case opinions
- (4:3) the demurrer would be allowed (per Brennan, Deane, Toohey & Gaudron JJ) (4:1) the Coast Islands Act was inconsistent with s10 of the Racial Discrimination Act 1975 and was thus invalid (per Brennan, Deane, Toohey & Gaudron JJ; Mason CJ & Dawson J not deciding)

Mabo v Queensland (No 1) was a significant court case decided in the High Court of Australia on 8 December 1988. It found that the Queensland Coast Islands Declaratory Act 1985, which attempted to retrospectively abolish native title rights, was not valid according to the Racial Discrimination Act 1975.

== Background to the case ==
The case was closely related to another proceeding in the High Court (Mabo v Queensland (No 2), decided in 1992) which was a dispute between the Meriam people (of the Mer Islands in the Torres Strait) and the Government of Queensland, in which several Meriam people, principally Eddie Mabo, contested that they had certain native title rights over the Murray Islands. In 1985, the Queensland Government passed the Queensland Coast Islands Declaratory Act, which was intended to retrospectively abolish any such native title rights, if they existed.

The Meriam people sought a demurrer to prevent the Queensland Government from relying on the Coast Islands Declaratory Act in their defence to the main case.

== The case ==
The main argument of the plaintiffs was that the Coast Islands Act was invalid, because it was contrary to the Racial Discrimination Act 1975, a law passed by the Parliament of Australia. Section 109 of the Constitution of Australia provides that where an Act of a state parliament is inconsistent with an Act of the Parliament of Australia, the state act is invalid to the extent of the inconsistency. As such, the plaintiffs argued that the Queensland Government were not able to rely on the Coast Islands Act as part of their defence in the main case. The Queensland Government argued that the Act was valid, and had the effect of extinguishing any rights which the plaintiffs may have had, which may have survived annexation of the islands in 1879.

Both parties agreed that the case should proceed on the assumption that the plaintiffs did actually hold native title rights, although the question had not been decided yet. The court agreed that the Coast Islands Act did operate to extinguish native title rights, if indeed they did exist. The main question was thus whether the Coast Islands Act was valid.

Section 10(1) of the Act provides that Commonwealth or State laws which deprive a person of one race or ethnic group of a right enjoyed by another group, then that law does not have effect. An important question was whether laws which have the effect of removing or limiting rights which are held only by a certain group falls under section 10(1).

== The decision ==
The majority judgment of Justices Brennan, Toohey and Gaudron found that native title rights, if they did exist, should be treated as part of a broader human right to own and inherit property. They said that the effect of the Coast Islands Act was to arbitrarily deprive the Meriam people of their traditional property, by denying their native title rights. As such, their right to own and inherit property was limited. By this reasoning, the demurrer was allowed and the Queensland Government was not allowed to rely on the Coast Islands Act.

== Consequences ==
This case was a significant step towards the recognition in the main case, Mabo v Queensland (No 2), that native title existed.

== See also ==
- List of Australian Native Title court cases
