= List of Australian native title court cases =

Native title in Australia is decided principally by the High Court and the Federal Court.

| Year | Case | Court | Comment |
|---|---|---|---|
| 1971 | Milirrpum v Nabalco Pty Ltd | Supreme Court (NT) | Overruled by the High Court in Mabo v Queensland (No 2) |
| 1982 | Koowarta v Bjelke-Petersen | High Court | The Racial Discrimination Act 1975 was a valid law |
| 1988 | Mabo v Queensland (No 1) | High Court | Queensland attempt to abolish native title was invalid as inconsistent with the Racial Discrimination Act 1975 |
| 1989 | Harper v Minister for Sea Fisheries [1989] HCA 47, (1989) 168 CLR 314 | High Court | |
| 1992 | Mabo v Queensland (No 2) | High Court | Rejected the doctrine of terra nullius and that indigenous land rights continued to exist in Australia |
| 1996 | Wik Peoples v Queensland | High Court | Native title rights could co-exist with statutory pastoral leases |
| 1998 | Fejo v Northern Territory [1998] HCA 58, (1998) 195 CLR 96 | High Court | Native title was completely extinguished by a grant of freehold title |
| 1999 | Yanner v Eaton [1999] HCA 53, (1999) 201 CLR 351 | High Court | Upheld the right to hunt as a part of native title rights |
| 1999 | Commonwealth v Yarmirr | High Court | Upheld non-exclusive native title rights to the sea and sea bed |
| 2002 | Western Australia v Ward | High Court | Native title is a bundle of rights, which may be extinguished one by one |
| 2002 | Yorta Yorta v Victoria | High Court | Upheld a finding that the "tide of history" had "washed away" traditional laws and customs and that the native title claim failed |
| 2003 | Neowarra v State of Western Australia [2003] FCA 1402 | Federal Court | |
| 2005 | Sampi v Western Australia [2005] FCA 777 | Federal Court | |
| 2005 | Wotjobaluk, Jaadwa, Jadawadjali, Wergaia and Jupagulk Peoples v Victoria | Federal Court | First successful native title claim in south-eastern Australia |
| 2007 | Gumana v Northern Territory [2007] FCAFC 23 | Federal Court (Full Court) | |
| 2008 | Bodney v Bennell (Noongar) | Federal Court (Full Court) | Whether native title continues to exist in and around Perth |
| 2013 | Akiba v Commonwealth | High Court | Licensing of fishing activates did not extinguish the relationship of the people to the land nor extinguish the native title right to take fish |
| 2025 | Commonwealth v Yunupingu | High Court | Native title rights are equivalent to property rights and therefore subject to compensation 'on just terms' when extinguished under the Constitution |

== See also ==
- Native title in Australia
