= Commonwealth v Yarmirr =

Native title claim in Australia

- Court: High Court of Australia
- Full case name: Commonwealth of Australia v Yarmirr
- Decided: 11 October 2001
- Citations: [2001] HCA 56, (2001) 208 CLR 1

Case history
- Prior actions: Yarmirr v Northern Territory [No 2] [1998] FCA 771, (1998) 82 FCR 533, Federal Court; Commonwealth of Australia v Yarmirr [1999] FCA 1668, (1999) 101 FCR 171, Federal Court (Full Court)

Court membership
- Judges sitting: Gleeson CJ, Gaudron, McHugh, Gummow, Kirby, Hayne and Callinan JJ

Yarmirr v Northern Territory was an Australian court case, decided in 2001. It was an application for the determination of native title to seas, sea-bed and sub-soil, over an area in the Northern Territory, ultimately determined on appeal to the High Court of Australia.

== Application ==
The application was made by Mary Yarmirr and others on behalf of a number of different clan groups of Aboriginal people to an area of seas and sea-beds surrounding Croker Island in the Northern Territory of Australia. The native title rights and interests claimed included the right to exclusive possession.

The case established that traditional owners do have native title of the sea and sea-bed; however, common law rights of fishing and navigation mean that only non-exclusive native title can exist over the sea.

The case aimed to determine, under Territorial application of the Native Title Act 1993 (Cth):

- Whether common law applies to territorial sea beyond low-water mark
- Whether common law recognises native title in territorial sea beyond low-water mark
- Whether recognition by common law influenced by legislative purpose of Native Title Act 1993 (Cth)
- Relevance of concept of radical title
- Effect of successive acquisitions of sovereignty over the territorial sea and sea-bed by the Crown in right of the United Kingdom in 1824 and the Crown in right of the Commonwealth by the Seas and Submerged Lands Act 1973 (Cth)
- Nature and effect of right and title to the territorial sea and sea-bed vested in the Northern Territory by the Coastal Waters (Northern Territory Title) Act 1980 (Cth).

== Determination ==
The trial judge, Olney J, determined members of the Croker Island community have a non-exclusive native title right to have free access to the sea and sea-bed of the claimed area for all or any of the following purposes:

1. to travel through or within the claimed area;
2. to fish, hunt and gather for the purpose of satisfying their personal, domestic or non-commercial communal needs, including the purpose of observing traditional, cultural, ritual and spiritual laws and customs;
3. to visit and protect places which are of cultural and spiritual importance;
4. to safeguard their cultural and spiritual knowledge.

The claimed area was defined by maps attached to the application for determination. It included the seas and extended to land or reefs within the proposed boundaries. Native title of Croker Island and other islands within the claimed area had been granted in 1980 and were not within the claim.

== Appeal ==
Both the Commonwealth and the claimants appealed the original determination. A full court of the Federal Court, by a majority, Beaumont and von Doussa JJ, dismissed both appeals. Merkel would have dismissed the appeal by the Commonwealth, allowed the appeal by the claimants and remitted the matter back to the trial judge for further hearing.

Both the Commonwealth and the claimants appealed to the High Court, which upheld the Commonwealths' appeal and dismissed claimants' appeal. The determination was thus amended so as to be restricted to and apply to the internal waters of the Northern Territory, including the inter-tidal zone both of the mainland and of the islands within the claimed area.

The claimants were ordered to pay the costs of both the claimants' and the Commonwealth's appeals.

== See also ==
- List of Australian Native Title court cases
- Native title in Australia
