= Wotjobaluk, Jaadwa, Jadawadjali, Wergaia and Jupagulk Peoples v Victoria =

2005 decision of the Federal Court of Australia

- Court: Federal Court of Australia
- Full case name: Clarke on behalf of the Wotjobaluk, Jaadwa, Jadawadjali, Wergaia and Jupagulk Peoples v Victoria
- Decided: 13 December 2005
- Citation: [2005] FCA 1795

Court membership
- Judge sitting: Merkel J

Wotjobaluk, Jaadwa, Jadawadjali, Wergaia and Jupagulk Peoples v Victoria, is a decision of the Federal Court of Australia delivered on 13 December 2005 by Justice Ron Merkel in respect of a native title claim determination for the Wimmera western region of Victoria. The determination was significant for the Jardwadjali and Wergaia peoples as it was the first successful native title claim in south-eastern Australia and in Victoria.

The Native Title claim was initially filed in 1995 and took 10 years for the legal process to come to determination. In his reasons for judgement Justice Merkel explained the significance of his orders:

The orders I propose to make are of special significance as they constitute the first recognition and protection of native title resulting in the ongoing enjoyment of native title in the State of Victoria and, it would appear, on the South-Eastern seaboard of Australia. These are areas in which the Aboriginal peoples suffered severe and extensive dispossession, degradation and devastation as a consequence of the establishment of British sovereignty over their lands and waters during the 19th century.

Justice Merkel also listed the influence of senior Wotjobaluk elder William John Kennedy, who was also known as Uncle Jack Kennedy, in his reasons for judgment. Kennedy died on 6 September 2005 before the determination but Justice Merkel acknowledged "he had, in a practical sense, achieved 'what the elders expected of [him]' by, as was stated in his eulogy, 'fighting for this little piece of country for his ancestors and for future generations.'"

In contrast to the Yorta Yorta v Victoria native title claim dismissed by Justice Olney in 1998, that was also subjected to failed appeals to the Full Court of the Federal Court of Australia, and the High Court in 2002 were also dismissed. and the High Court of Australia, Justice Merkel ruled:

the 'tide of history' has not 'washed away' any real acknowledgement of traditional laws and any real observance of traditional customs by the applicants and has not, as a consequence, resulted in the foundation of their native title disappearing....Indeed, the evidence in, and the outcome of, the present case is a living example of the principle that is now recognised in native title jurisprudence that traditional laws and customs are not fixed and unchanging. Rather, they evolve over time in response to new or changing social and economic exigencies to which all societies adapt as their social and historical contexts change.

== See also ==
- Jardwadjali
- List of Australian Native Title court cases
- Native title in Australia
- Wergaia
