= Meriam people =

Indigenous Australian group of Torres Strait Islander people

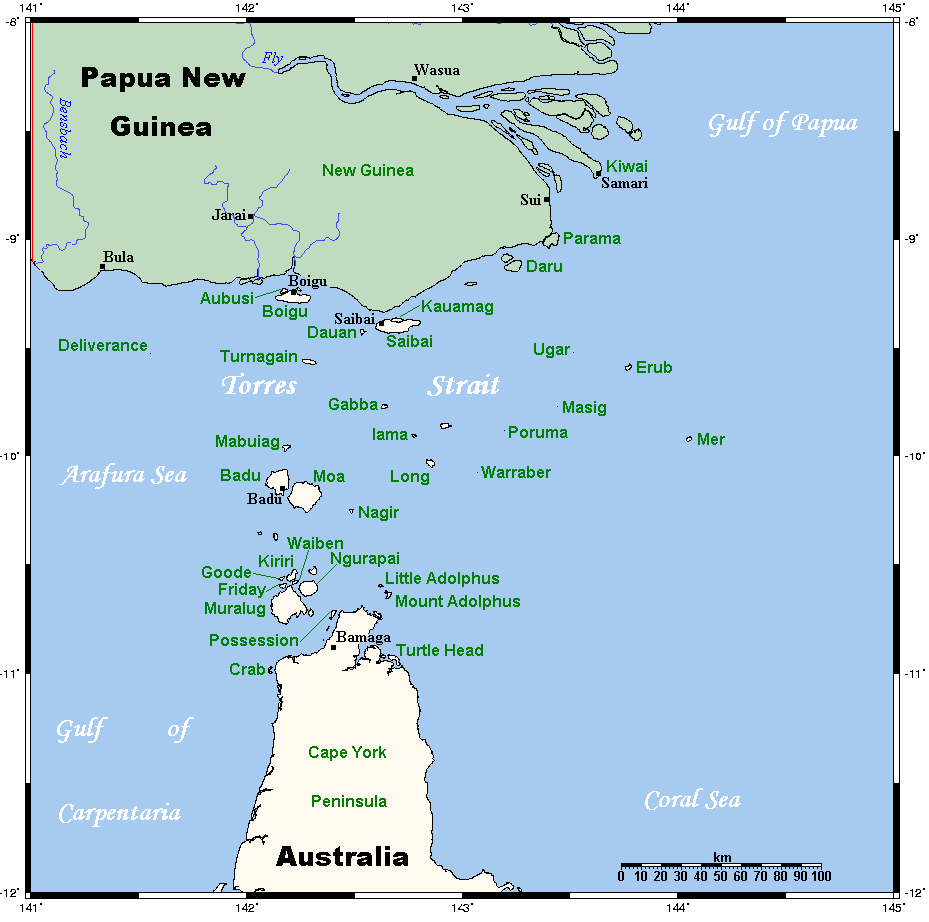
- A map of the Torres Strait Islands showing Mer in the north-eastern waters of Torres Strait (Kelisi, 2006)

Total population
- 875 (ABS, 2016); 450 (Mer Island); 85 (Ugar Island); 328 (Erub Island)

Regions with significant populations
- Mer (Murray) Island · Ugar (Stephen) Island · Erub (Darnley Island)

Languages
- Meriam Mir Language · Language family (Trans-Fly)

Religion
- Christianity (predominantly Pentecostal and Anglican (ABS, 2016)

Melanesian Meriam people are an Indigenous Australian group of Torres Strait Islander people who are united by a common language, strong ties of kinship and live as skilled hunter–fisher–gatherers in family groups or clans on a number of outer eastern Torres Strait Islands including Mer or Murray Island, Ugar or Stephen Island and Erub or Darnley Island. The Meriam people are perhaps best known for their involvement in the High Court of Australia's Mabo decision which fundamentally changed land law in Australia - recognising native title.

Although gardening takes priority, each Meriam family has sea rights, and on the reefs in front of their houses, which are mainly built above the beach, they maintain stone fish-weirs and crayfish holes.

== Demographics ==
Melanesian Meriam people primarily reside in a small island of volcanic origin situated at the eastern end of the Torres Strait, known as Mer (Murray) Island. The Murray group also comprises two other islands, Erub (Darnely) and Ugar (Stephens) Islands in which traditional laws of boundary and ownership organise them. The three islands are considered as the Meriam cluster. While these Islands predominantly contain Aboriginal and Torres Strait Islanders who associate as Meriam people, each Island differs in their population and demographics. Mer homes eight tribes of the Meriam people, which have been around for thousands of years. These include:

- Komet
- Zagareb
- Meauram
- Magaram
- Geuram
- Peibre
- Meriam-samsep
- Piadram
- Dauer Meriam

	Mer Island	Erub Island
People
Male	227 (50.8%)	173 (52.7%)
Female	220 (49.2%)	155 (47.3%)
Aboriginal and/ or Torres Strait Islander people	432 (96.4%)	310 (95.7%)
Ancestry
Torres Strait Islander	356 (72.1%)	243 (62.1%)
Australian	21 (4.3%)	24 (6.1%)
Australian Aboriginal	16 (3.2%)	28 (7.2%)
English	12 (2.4%)	0 (0%)
Irish	7 (1.4%)	0 (0%)
Religion
Anglican	210 (45.7%)	79 (23.4%)
Christian	74 (16.1%)	53 (15.7%)
Pentecostal	46 (10%)	80 (23.7%)
Other spiritual beliefs	12 (2.6%)	40 (11.8%)
Not stated	77 (16.7%)	39 (11.5%)
Languages
Yumplatok (Torres Strait Creole)	236 (52.6%)	243 (73.9%)
Meriam Mir	106 (23.6%)	0 (0%)
English only	16 (3.6%)	13 (4.0%)
Households where a non-English language is spoken	83 (69.7%)	62 (75.6%)

Table 1. Data collected from ABS (2016)

Mer and Erub Island both have a large population hence ABS data regarding demographics is available on the two islands, Ugar Island only comprises a small population of 85 people. Hence not much ABS data is available. All that is known as of the 2016 ABS census is that there are 60.7% males and 39.3% females with the median age of 19 comprising the Ugar Island.

== Culture ==
Meriam people have a distinct culture from other Torres Strait Islander groups. Indigenous cultural groups rituals and practices are characterised by their beliefs in the Dreamtime and mythologies. Meriam people differ from other Indigenous groups as many of their rituals are surrounded by their engagement in agriculture and farming. Hence Meriam people place great focus on enhancing individual garden productivity. Therefore, common with all Indigenous groups, the younger generation learn from their elders, hence Meriam fathers pass down their techniques of gardening cultivation to their sons which would be carried on throughout future generations. During certain ceremonies such as deaths, marriages and adoption ceremonies excess produce would be made available for exchange to sustain those engaged in the cultural rituals.

=== Totems ===
Totems are important in Aboriginal and Torres Strait Islander culture, as they are commonly adopted as a family or clan emblem used to maintain and continue connections with Indigenous land, the Dreamtime and their ancestors. These totems play great significance from the moment an Indigenous child is born, as at the time of birth a child is given a totem in order to connect them to their physical and kin relatedness. Each Indigenous clan has different totems which are unique to them in their own ways.

A shared totem among all eight Meriam tribes is a shark. This totem arises from a story in which a father and son got lost while hunting and waited for sharks to rescue them. Therefore, sharks are seen as a totem animal who would protect the Meriam people and not attack them. It is forbidden for men (who usually would hunt prior to European colonisation) to hunt sharks as they are seen as animals who would not harm the Meriam people.

While individual clan's totems arise from stories, over time these stories have been lost as elders have been unable to communicate them to younger generations due to past policies that separated Aboriginal and Torres Strait Islander people. However, the following totems are known for the following tribes of the Mer people:

- Komet, totems include sardine and mangrove
- Zagareb, totems include seagull and Torres Strait pigeon
- Meauram, totems include turtle
- Magaram, totems include whale and snake
- Geuram, totems include whale, snake and dove
- Peibrem totems include mantaray
- Meriam-samsep, totems include tiger shark, Torres Strait pigeon and driftwood totems
- Piadram, totems include tiger shark, Torres Strait pigeon, driftwood and whale
- Dauer Meriam totem includes Tagai constellation

=== Mythology and cosmogony ===
The stories told by elders to the younger generations allow for the transgenerational learning of the Meriam culture. Some of the stories explain why certain rituals or practices are important in Indigenous clans.

Torres Strait Islanders in particular the Mer people are seafarers, sea country was used as a place for gardening, hunting, fishing, ceremonies, art, music, dance and storytelling. The story of Nageg (pronounced Nar-gegg) and Geigi (pronounced Gay-gee) explains the importance of sea country. It explains how Nageg and Geigi, a mother and son became known as triggerfish and trevally, through a creation story of the Tig Dowareb Clan of Murray Island. The story begins with Geigi, the son disguising himself as a kingfish among many sardines to fool an old man who would hunt for sardines. When the old man notices he is being fooled he takes Geigi disguised as the kingfish home one night for dinner and eats him, falling asleep soon after under a tree. Nageg, the mother cuts open the old man and takes Geigi out demanding him to live in the ocean to break the spears of those who try to spear him eventually becoming trevally. Whereas Geigi demands Nageg to live on the rock cave on the reef piercing anyone with her fin if they try to catch her, becoming triggerfish.

The Gelam story explains the creations of the three islands – Mer, Waier and Dauar of the Murray group, which resulted due to Gelam's mother's trickery and Gelam's lies. Gelam was a boy who lived in Moa Island in the Torres Strait, he was known for his skilful hunting. The story begins by Gelam purposely keeping the fat birds he would hunt for himself and giving his mother the lean birds. After his mother noticed this, she decided to scare him one day while he was hunting by dressing up as a dogai by covering herself in mud, this worked and successfully scared Gelam as he ran home frightened. However, Gelam realised his mother played a trick on him as he noticed the residue of mud under her eyes when he reached home, this caused Gelam to leave his home, he gathered fruits, seeds and soils and set off in the canoe he carved himself. Gelam reached the Great Barrier Reef, where it is said today if you fly to the Torres Strait over Central Islands some of the reefs look like Gelam's tears from when he was leaving his home crying. This journey eventually led to the creation of three islands – Mer, Waier and Dauar.

=== Religion ===
Christianity is the most common religion preached on the Murray, Ugar and Erub Islands, with Anglicanism and Pentecostalism being the most populated sectors. Christianity has influenced Aboriginal and Torres Strait Islander spirituality, as a result of past policies such as segregation and assimilation policies which separated Indigenous people from their families restricting them from practicing their spiritual beliefs, and instead raising them with Christian values. As a result, many Indigenous Australians are Christian today. However Indigenous spirituality and Christian spirituality can peacefully coexist in Indigenous people's lives, particularly for the Meriam people.

As quoted by an elder of Murray Island, "culture is very important…culture is identity" and "religion is very important…God taught spirit and wisdom". Meriam people both express their cultural identity through their dreamtime stories and rituals, while still valuing their religion. Christianity was also easily accepted by the Meriam people because before religion the Mer people would follow the rule of Malo, which has principles and structure similar to Christianity.

=== Traditions ===
A significant tradition of the Meriam people that still remains significant today despite the influence of European colonisation is Meriam people's death rites. In the death rituals and customs of Meriam people of the Murray Island, bright meteors play an important role which relate to spiritual elements of death rites.

Maier, the name given to bright meteors is symbolic as it not only informs observers about the passing of a person in their community it also enables spirits of the dead to communicate with those alive. Maier therefore informs people about their life, social status and follows as a warning to follow traditional customs, while representing the dead or dying person's spirit. The brightness, colour and trajectory of the Maier further informs the observer about characteristics of the person and their life. The knowledge and meaning behind Maier's are passed down through oral tradition, such as storytelling and material culture as it is significant in serving as a means of culture

== Mabo case ==
The Meriam people are most commonly known for their contribution to Native Title, which recognised their rights to their land and overturned the expanded doctrine of terra nullius as applicable to domestic law. The five Meriam people who contributed to this were Eddie Koiki Mabo, Reverend David Passi, Sam Passi, James Rice and Celuia Mapo Sale.

The Mabo case began on 20 May 1982 primarily led by Eddie Mabo and the four other mentioned Meriam people. On 3 June 1992 terra nullius was overturned and native title was recognised by the High Court, recognising the Meriam people were entitled to all rights and use of the Murray Islands.

The Murray Island returning to the traditional owners (Meriam people) is significant for Meriam people, as prior to European contact they had a strong sense of connection to their islands, seas and reefs surrounding them. Hence being stripped of this not only resulted in loss of traditions but also a loss of kinship ties.

Mabo and the four other Meriam people's contribution were significant to rekindling their connection to the land, and as a result Meriam people celebrate the High Court's ruling of the Native Title every June third, paying tribute to Mabo. The Mer people gather together performing dances, prayers and feast to acknowledge the achievements of the applicants.

== Notable Meriam people ==
=== Arts ===
Wasie Tardent and Clinton Naina are one of the few Meriam artists that narrate their storytelling traditions through artwork.

=== Politicians ===
- The five Meriam people who contributed to the Mabo Case
  - Eddie Koiki Mabo, land rights campaigner
  - Reverend David Passi, Anglican priest, traditional landowner and land rights campaigner
  - Sam Passi, school teacher and linguist
  - James Rice
  - Celuia Mapo Sale

=== Professionals/ Academics ===
- Dr Vanessa Lee – senior lecturer at the University of Sydney in behavioural and social sciences
- Thelma Weston – named Female Elder of the Year for lifelong work as a nurse and health worker

== See also ==
- Meriam language
- Torres Strait Islanders
