= Stephens Island (Torres Strait) =

Island in the Torres Strait, Queensland, Australia

Native name: Ugar
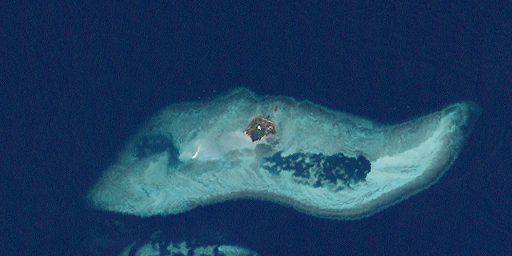
- A Landsat image of Stephens Island

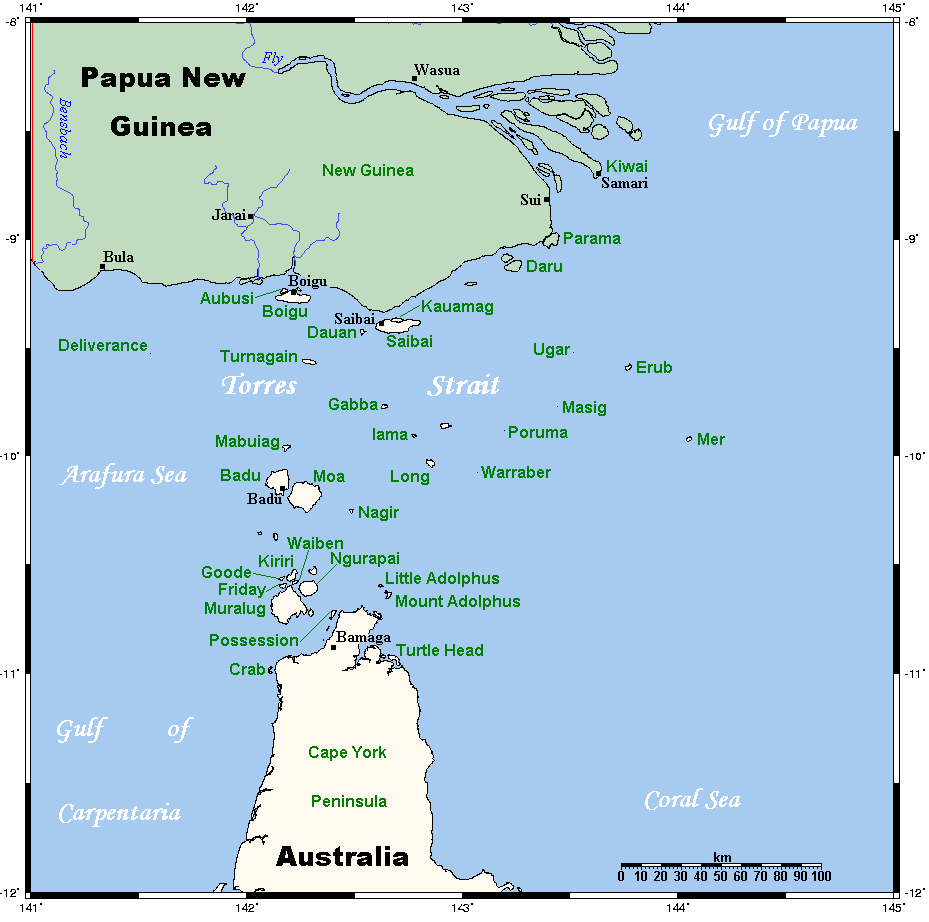
- A map of the Torres Strait Islands showing Ugar in the northeastern waters of Torres Strait
- Etymology: Philip Stephens

Geography
- Location: Northern Australia
- Coordinates: 9.507°S 143.545°E
- Archipelago: Torres Strait Islands
- Adjacent to: Torres Strait

Administration
- Australia
- State: Queensland
- Local government area: Torres Strait Island Region

Demographics
- Ethnic groups: Ugarem Le

Stephens Island, called Ugar in the local Meriam language, lies in the eastern group of the Torres Strait Islands archipelago of Queensland, Australia. The island is within the locality of Ugar Island within the local government area of the Torres Strait Island Region.

== Geography ==
The island is located near the Great Barrier Reef and north of Coconut Island (also called Poruma) and northwest of Murray Island and west of Darnley Island.

== Islanders ==
The Torres Islander people of the island are of Melanesian origin and hold close kinship ties with the Islander people of Darnley Island (Erub) and Murray Island (Mer). The traditional owners of Stephens Island call themselves the Ugarem-Le. The Ugarem-Le lived in village communities following traditional patterns of hunting, fishing, agriculture and trade for many thousands of years before contact was made with European visitors to the region.

The people of Stephens Island call themselves Ugarem Le, and are the same people as the neighbouring Erubam Le of Erub (Darnley Island), the Meriam Le and Nog Le of Mer (Murray), the Dauarab Le of Dauar and the people of Waier. The traditional language of these islands is Meriam Mìr, of which there were formerly two dialects, Erub-Ugar and Mer-Dauar-Waier.

== Etymology ==
The island's European name was bestowed by Captain William Bligh in 1792 during his second breadfruit voyage to the Pacific, after Philip Stephens, First Secretary to the Admiralty.

== History of Stephens Island ==
=== European contact ===
In September 1792, Captain William Bligh, in charge of the British Navy ships Providence and Assistant, visited Torres Strait and mapped the main reefs and channels. Bligh gave Stephens Island its name. In 1793, the merchant vessel Shah Hormuzear and the whaler Chesterfield anchored off Darnley Island. A party of 6 sailors were killed by the Islanders when they were discovered polluting Darnley Island's only supply of fresh water. In retaliation the Captains Alt and Bampton ordered the destruction of huts, canoes and gardens on Darnley Island and several Islanders were killed. Captains Alt and Bampton next travelled to Stephens Island in search of a boat which went missing during the attack. The Ugarem-Le shot arrows at the sailors when they landed on the Island. The crew returned with gunfire and set fire to a village on Stephens Island.

In the early 1860s, beche-de-mer (sea cucumber) and pearling boats began working the reefs of Torres Strait. In June 1879, the Queensland Coast Islands Act 1879 was passed by the Queensland Government, allowing it to claim all Torres Strait islands including Stephens Island, beyond the previous 60 mile limit. This Act enabled the Queensland Government to control and regulate the beche-de-mer and pearling industries, which previously had operated outside its jurisdiction. A beche-de-mer station was established on Stephens Island in the 1880s by a man named Wilson.

Torres Strait Islanders refer to the arrival of London Missionary Society (LMS) missionaries at Erub in July 1871 as "the Coming of the Light" and is celebrated each year with the Coming of the Light Festival. Around 1900, the LMS missionary Rev. Walker established a philanthropic business scheme named Papuan Industries Limited (PIL). PIL encouraged Islander communities to co-operatively rent or purchase their own pearl luggers or "company boats". The "company boats" were used to harvest pearl shells and beche-de-mer, which was sold and distributed by PIL. The people of Stephens Island made arrangements to purchase their first company boat in 1905. Company boats provided Islanders with income and a sense of community pride and also improved transport and communication between the islands.

In November 1912, 800 acres of land on Stephens Island were officially gazetted as an Aboriginal reserve by the Queensland Government. Many other Torres Strait Islands were gazetted as Aboriginal reserves at the same time. By 1918, a Protector of Aboriginals had been appointed to Thursday Island and during the 1920s and 1930s racial legislation was strictly applied to Torres Strait Islanders, enabling the government to remove Islanders to reserves and missions across Queensland. A government school was built on Stephens Island in 1925.

In 1936, around 70% of the Torres Strait Islander workforce went on strike, in the first organised challenge against government authority made by Torres Strait Islanders. The 9-month strike was an expression of Islanders' anger and resentment at increasing government control of their livelihoods. The strike protested against government interference in wages, trade and commerce and also called for the lifting of evening curfews, the removal of the permit system for inter-island travel, and the recognition of the Islanders' right to recruit their own boat crews.

The strike produced a number of significant reforms and innovations. Unpopular local Protector J.D. McLean was removed and replaced by Cornelius O'Leary. O'Leary established a system of regular consultations with elected Islander council representatives. The new councils were given a degree of autonomy including control over local island police and courts.

On 23 August 1937 O'Leary convened the first Inter Islander Councillors Conference at Yorke Island. Representatives from 14 Torres Strait communities attended. Ned Oroki represented Stephens Island at the conference. After lengthy discussions, unpopular bylaws (including the evening curfews) were cancelled, and a new code of local representation was agreed upon. In 1939, the Queensland Government passed the Torres Strait Islander Act 1939, which incorporated many of the recommendations discussed at the conference. A key section of the new act officially recognised Torres Strait Islanders as a separate people from Aboriginal Australians.

During World War II in 1941, the Australian Government began recruiting Torres Strait Islander men to serve in the armed forces. Recruited men from Stephens Island and other island communities formed the Torres Strait Light Infantry. While the Torres Strait Islander recruits were respected as soldiers, they only received one third of the pay given to white Australian servicemen. On 31 December 1943, a number of companies of the Torres Strait Light Infantry went on strike calling for equal pay and equal rights for all soldiers. The Australian military hierarchy agreed to increase their pay to two thirds the level received by white servicemen. Full back pay was offered in compensation to the Torres Strait servicemen by the Australian Government in the 1980s.

After gaining its independence from Australia in 1975, Papua New Guinea asserted its right to the islands and waters of the Torres Straits. In December 1978, a treaty was signed by the Australian and Papua New Guinea governments that described the boundaries between the 2 countries and the use of the sea area by both parties. The Torres Strait Treaty, which has operated since February 1985, contains special provision for free movement (without passports or visas) between both countries. Free movement between communities applies to traditional activities such as fishing, trading and family gatherings, which occur in a specifically created Protected Zone and nearby areas. The Protected Zone also assists in the preservation and protection of the land, sea, air and native plant and animal life of the Torres Strait.

=== Local government and Deed of Grant communities ===
On 30 March 1985, the Stephens Island community elected 3 councillors to constitute an autonomous Stephens Island Council established under the Community Services (Torres Strait) Act 1984. This Act conferred local government type powers and responsibilities upon Torres Strait Islander councils for the first time. The Aboriginal reserve on the island, held by the Queensland Government, was transferred on 21 October 1985 to the trusteeship of the council under a Deed of Grant in Trust. On 24 April 2002 the council's name was changed from Stephens Island Council to Ugar Island Council.

In 2007, the Local Government Reform Commission recommended that the 15 Torres Strait Island councils be abolished and the Torres Strait Island Regional Council (TSIRC) be established in their place. In elections conducted under the Local Government Act 1993 on 15 March 2008, members of the 15 communities comprising the TSIRC local government area each voted for a local councillor and a mayor to constitute a council consisting of 15 councillors plus a mayor.

== See also ==
- List of Torres Strait Islands
