= Jupagalk =

The Jupagalk or Jupagulk are an Aboriginal people of northern Victoria, Australia. They may have been a Wergaia clan.

== Language ==
The language of the Jupagalk was related to Jaara, according to remarks by Alfred William Howitt, as interpreted by Norman Tindale. (Note: Tindale cites Howitt in Palmer 1884, which fails verification. The actual source is another paper by Howitt in the same volume, referring to the Avoca river (i.e. Jaara) tribe identified as belonging to the Jajowrong, with its special tribal name "Jupa-galk-wournditch".)

== Country ==
The eastern boundaries of Jupagalk territory, which extended over 1,700 square miles (4,400 km^{2}), went as far as Gonn. Their southern boundary ended around Charlton. They extended west of Kerang, and southwest towards Lake Buloke. The northern frontier lay beyond Towaninnie.

== Social organization ==
The Jupagalk tribe was composed of several clans.

== Alternative names ==
- Jambajamba (jamba means 'no')
- Mallenjerrick ("people of the mallee")
- Towanninny
- Yamba, Yambayamba
- Yow-ew-nil-lurn
- Yuppila, Yupa-galk-wournditch ("people of the native box (Bursaria spinosa) country")

== See also ==
- Wotjobaluk, Jaadwa, Jadawadjali, Wergaia and Jupagulk Peoples v Victoria

== Sources ==
- AIATSIS (26 July 2019). "S94: Jupagalk". collection.aiatsis.gov.au. AIATSIS.
- Howitt, A. W. (1884). "On Some Australian Beliefs". The Journal of the Anthropological Institute of Great Britain and Ireland. 13: 185–198. doi:10.2307/2841724. JSTOR 2841724.
- Palmer, Edward; Howitt, A. W. (1884). "Notes on Some Australian Tribes". The Journal of the Anthropological Institute of Great Britain and Ireland. 13: 276–347. doi:10.2307/2841896. JSTOR 2841896.
- Tindale, Norman Barnett (1974). "Jupagalk (VIC)". Aboriginal Tribes of Australia: Their Terrain, Environmental Controls, Distribution, Limits, and Proper Names. Australian National University Press. ISBN 978-0-708-10741-6.
