= Wik Peoples v Queensland =

1996 High Court of Australia decision

- Court: High Court of Australia
- Full case name: The Wik Peoples v State of Queensland & Ors; The Thayorre People v State of Queensland & Ors
- Decided: 23 December 1996
- Citations: [1996] HCA 40, (1996) 187 CLR 1

Case history
- Prior action: Wik Peoples v Queensland (1996) 63 FCR 450; 134 ALR 637
- Appealed from: Federal Court

Case opinions
- (4:3) the pastoral leases in question did not extinguish native title (4:3) native title rights and pastoral lease rights can coexist, but where they are inconsistent, the pastoral rights prevail
- Majority: Toohey, Gaudron, Gummow & Kirby JJ
- Dissent: Brennan CJ, Dawson & McHugh JJ decision

Wik Peoples v The State of Queensland (commonly known as the Wik decision) is a decision of the High Court of Australia delivered on 23 December 1996, on whether statutory leases extinguish native title rights. The court found that the statutory pastoral leases under consideration by the court did not bestow rights of exclusive possession on the leaseholder. As a result, native title rights could coexist depending on the terms and nature of the particular pastoral lease. Where there was a conflict of rights, the rights under the pastoral lease would extinguish the remaining native title rights.

The decision provoked a significant debate in Australian politics. It led to intense discussions on the validity of land holdings in Australia. Some political leaders criticised the court for being out of touch and for introducing uncertainty into Australian life. The Howard government formulated a "10-point plan" to bring certainty to land ownership in Australia. This plan led to the longest debate in the Australian Senate’s history.

== Background ==
In 1992, the High Court held in Mabo that the common law of Australia recognises Aboriginal and Torres Strait Islanders had a form of "native title," which reflected the entitlement of indigenous inhabitants to their traditional lands in accordance with their laws or customs. Native title was not defined by the Wik decision. However, it is commonly accepted to include rights to perform ceremonies or to gather foods or medicines.

== The Wik peoples ==
The Wik peoples are a grouping of Aboriginal Australians who reside in north-eastern Australia. They live in an area on the western Cape York Peninsula between 11° 40' and 14° 50' south latitude. The group comprises the peoples of Wik-Ompom, Wik-Mungkana, Wik-Paacha, Wik-Thinta, Wik-Ngathara, Wik-Epa, Wik-Me'anha, Wik-Nganthara, Wik-Nganychara, and Wik-Liyanh. Their traditional lands centre around the Archer River and the Edward River. The term Wik actually means "speech" or "language" in the Aboriginal languages of the region.

The Wik people have previously litigated native title-type claims. In 1975, part of the Aboriginal reserve at Aurukun created in 1957 had been excised by the Queensland Government for a bauxite mining lease. The lease was granted to the Commonwealth Aluminium Corporation Pty Limited (Comalco) through a special act of Parliament, the Aurukun Associates Act 1975 (Qld). There was an initial win in the Supreme Court of Queensland against the lease. However, an appeal to the Privy Council in London led to the decision being overturned.

In the 1970s, the then-Aboriginal Development Commission attempted to purchase part of a pastoral lease. This lease was over part of traditional lands used by the "Winchanam" clan. The Bjelke-Petersen government refused to allow the purchase of the lease. A challenge in the High Court ensued, and the action was won by the corporation. However, the Queensland Government frustrated the decision by declaring the land a national park.

== Basis of the Wik claim ==
The Wik people and the Thaayorre people claimed to be the holders of native titles over two areas of land. The first is known as "Holroyd River Holding" and the other is known as "Michellton Pastoral Leases." Their claim before the court was on the basis that their native title was not extinguished by the granting of the various leases over the land. They asserted that their native title rights continued and co-existed with the pastoral lease. The Wik Peoples also claimed declarations, which challenged the validity of the Special Bauxite Mining Leases which had been granted by the Queensland Government pursuant to the Commonwealth Aluminium Corporation Pty Limited Agreement Act 1957 (Qld) and the Aurukun Associates Agreement Act 1975 (Qld). These claims were brought before the commencement of the Native Title Act 1993 (Cth), came into operation. That law came into being because of the High Court’s decision in Mabo v Queensland (No 2).

=== The Holroyd River Holding ===
The Holroyd River Holding is 1,119 square miles (2,900 km^{2}) in area. The first Holroyd lease was issued to Marie Stuart Perkins in 1945. It was granted under the Land Act 1910 (Qld). This lease was surrendered in 1973. The first lease was granted for pastoral purposes. A second lease for thirty years was issued under the Land Act 1962 (Qld) in 1975 to John Herbert Broinowski, John Darling, James Maurice Gordon, and Ross Farm Pty Ltd. The second lease was not limited to pastoral purposes. The Holroyd land was subject solely to a claim by the Wik people.

=== The Mitchellton Lease ===
The Mitchellton Lease was 535 square miles (1,390 km^{2}) in area. It is located north of Normanton, in far north Queensland. The claim extends from the Mitchell River to the Edward River in the north and west to the Gulf of Carpentaria. It is in the District of Cook which was opened up for occupation in 1866. The first Michellton lease was granted to Alfred Joseph Smith, Thomas Alexander Simpson and Marshall Hanley Woodhouse in 1915 under the Land Act 1910. The lessees did not take up actual possession of the land. The first lease was forfeited for non-payment of rent in 1918. A second lease was granted in 1919. The new lessee also did not take up possession. The lease was surrendered in 1921. Each lease was issued for pastoral purposes. Since 1922 the land had been reserved for the benefit of Aboriginals. Both the Wik people and the Thayorre People made claims over the area.

=== The mining leases ===
There were also what were called the Comalco and Aurukun matters. Comalco Aluminium Ltd held several bauxite mining leases issued by the Queensland State Government under the Comalco Act 1957 (Qld). In each of these claims, the Wik peoples alleged that the mining leases were invalid because the Queensland Government owed fiduciary duties as a trustee to the Wik people, and that those duties had been breached by the granting of the mining leases. The Aurukun claim also included an attack on an agreement called the Aurukun Associates Agreement entered into under the Aurukun Associates Agreement Act 1975 (Qld).

== The original decision ==
The Wik peoples lodged their claim on 30 June 1993 in the Federal Court of Australia. The claim was lodged before the commencement of Native Title legislation, introduced into Australia following the decision in the Mabo case. The State of Queensland was the first respondent to the claim. The Commonwealth of Australia was the second respondent. At a later stage, the Thayorre People were also joined as respondents. The Thayorre people also cross-claimed because their claim overlapped the claim of the Wik Peoples. The matter came on for hearing before Drummond. Five preliminary questions were posed for determination by the Court. Drummond heard the claim between 17 and 26 October and 14 and 15 December 1994. He delivered his decision 29 January 1996 in Brisbane.

On 29 January 1996 Drummond gave judgment on the five preliminary questions that had been identified. He found that the granting of the leases over the two land claims extinguished any native title rights to those lands. In Drummond’s opinion, each lease gave exclusive possession to the lessees. Drummond did not have to decide whether the Wik people or the Thayorre people actually were the holders of native title rights in respect of the land.

On 22 March 1996 Justice Spender granted the appellants leave to appeal to the Full Court of the Federal Court against the judgment. Subsequent to that grant leave, the High Court made orders that the appeal be removed into the High Court for determination by that court.

== The appeal ==
The appeal was heard by the High Court between 11 and 13 June 1996 with all 7 judges sitting, Gerard Brennan CJ, Daryl Dawson, John Toohey, Mary Gaudron, Michael McHugh, William Gummow and Michael Kirby JJ. The court reserved its decision until 23 December 1996. The Court decided in favour of the Wik people by a four/three majority. Each of the majority judges wrote separate judgments in support of their decision. The majority focused on the meaning of a “lease” as used in Australia at the time. The court focused on the purpose for which the leases were granted at that time in light of the social and economic conditions of the times. The minority judges wrote a single joint judgment. They focused on the leases as well, but concluded that the leases conferred the right to exclusive occupation of the land thereby extinguishing native title.

The majority decision became a proposition for:

- A pastoral lease does not confer rights of exclusive possession on the holder of the lease.
- The rights and obligations depend on the nature and terms of the lease.
- Where the rights of the lease are in conflict with native title rights, then the rights under the lease will prevail to the extent of any inconsistency.
- The granting of a lease does not extinguish any remaining native title rights.

== Political response to the decision ==
The decision provoked significant political and public reactions in Australia. Deputy Prime Minister John Anderson said that “country people are concerned with the Wik Native Title problem" Some State Premiers went further and publicly commented that suburban backyards were under threat from native title claims. Queensland Premier Rob Borbidge even commented that some of the High Court judges were "dills about history." Prime Minister John Howard in a press conference held up a map of Australia purporting to show how much of Australia was at risk from native title claims. The Bulletin led with a cover in December 1997 depicting "Land Rights: How Much is Too Much" with the clear implication that all land holdings in Australia were under threat from native title claims as a result of the decision.

Others pointed out that the decision only affected leasehold land and not the overwhelming majority of Australia which is freehold land held under “fee simple”. The High Court had made clear that native title was extinguished in that situation. They emphasised the “shared use” of the land with a theme of "co-existence."

== The Wik 10 Point Plan ==
The Howard government promised a response to the decision and came up with the “Wik 10 Point Plan”. Howard argued the decision "pushed the pendulum back too far in the Aboriginal direction (and) the 10 Point Plan will return the pendulum to the centre". The Native Title Amendment Bill 1997 (Cth) was drawn up to implement the plan. It was introduced into the Commonwealth Parliament on 4 September 1997. It was passed by the House of Representatives, however, the Senate made 217 amendments to the bill and returned it to the lower house for reconsideration. The House of Representatives agreed to half of the changes but returned the bill to the Senate again. It was eventually passed one year later on 8 July 1998 by the Senate after the longest debate in the history of the Senate. One commentator described the amendments to native title law as using a "legal sledge hammer to crack a political nut".

== Legal commentary on the decision ==
Maureen Tehan describes the Wik decision as the high point in law for native title in Australia. The decision balanced the rights of the pastoralists and the rights of Aboriginal people, but placed the primacy of pastoral title over native title. Richard Bartlett argues that the decision placed great significance on the principle of equality at common law. Philip Hunter notes that criticism of the High Court was "totally unjustified". He states that the High Court recognised that native title was in no way destructive of the title of pastoralists. He points out that where native title clashed with pastoral interests, pastoral interests would always override native title.

Frank Brennan described the approach of the court as taking into account an "incomplete reading of the history". Gim Del Villar goes further and argues that the Wik judgment is "flawed" from a historical perspective. He argues that the court used questionable historical material to reach its conclusion that pastoral leases were not common law leases. He notes that in 1870 the Supreme Court of Queensland held that pastoral leases did confer a right of exclusive possession which reflected a common belief at that time that leases did extinguish native title. Del Villar points to despatches from Earl Grey in which there is the clear implication that native title was not to be respected when granting pastoral leases.

== See also ==
- Wik languages
- Koowarta v Bjelke-Petersen
- List of Australian Native Title court cases
