= Waua Islet, Queensland =

Waua Islet
- Suburb
- Interactive map of Waua Islet
- Coordinates: 9.9486°S 144.0363°E
- Country: Australia
- State: Queensland
- LGA: Torres Strait Island Region
- Location: 3.5 km (2.2 mi) S of Mer Island; 211 km (131 mi) ENE of Thursday Island; 793 km (493 mi) NNW of Cairns; 2,156 km (1,340 mi) NNW of Brisbane

Government
  - State electorate: Cook
  - Federal division: Leichhardt

Area
  - Total: 0.1 km^{2} (0.039 sq mi)

Population
  - Total: 0 (2021 census)
  - Density: 0/km^{2} (0/sq mi)
- Time zone: UTC+10:00 (AEST)
- Postcode: 4875
Suburbs around Waua Islet
Dowar Islet	Mer Island	Coral Sea
Coral Sea	Waua Islet	Coral Sea
Coral Sea	Coral Sea	Coral Sea

Waua Islet is an island locality in the Torres Strait Island Region, Queensland, Australia. It consists of a single island, also called Waua Islet (also known as Wyer Island and Waier Island), one of the Murray Islands. In the 2021 census, Waua Islet had "no people or a very low population".

== Demographics ==
In the 2021 census, Waua Islet had "no people or a very low population".

== Education ==
There are no schools in Waua Islet. The nearest government primary school is the Mer Island primary campus of Tagai State College (Early Childhood-6). The nearest government secondary school is secondary campus of Tagai State College is on Thursday Island over 200 kilometres (120 mi) away. Boarding facilities are available on Thursday Island. The other alternative is distance education.
