= Yanner v Eaton =

1999 Australian High Court case

- Court: High Court of Australia
- Decided: 7 October 1999
- Citation: Yanner v Eaton [1999] HCA 53

Case history
- Prior actions: Eaton v Yanner; ex parte Eaton [1998] QCA 20
- Appealed from: Queensland Court of Appeal

Ruling
- Appeal allowed

Court membership
- Judges sitting: Chief justice Murray Gleeson; Justice Mary Gaudron; Justice Michael McHugh; Justice William Gummow; Justice Michael Kirby; Justice Kenneth Hayne; Justice Ian Callinan

Yanner v Eaton is a judicial decision of the High Court of Australia in relation to indigenous land rights and their interaction with legislature. It considers the legal nature of property in conjunction with native title rights.

The High Court decision overturned a previous appeal in the Queensland Court of Appeal, which had overturned a local magistrates' court decision.

== Background ==
Location of Cliffdale Creek

Murrandoo Bulanyi Mungabayi Yanner was a member of the Gunnamulla clan of the Gangalidda tribe. In late 1994 he used a traditional Aboriginal hunting method to catch and take two juvenile estuarine crocodiles in Cliffdale Creek in the Gulf of Carpentaria. He and others in his clan ate some of the crocodile meat and froze the rest, including the skins.

The now-repealed Fauna Conservation Act 1974 (Qld) (Fauna Act) states:

"A person shall not take, keep or attempt to take or keep fauna of any kind unless he is the holder of a licence, permit, certificate or other authority granted and issued under this Act."

Yanner did not possess a license or similar as required by the Fauna Act, and was hence charged with one count of taking fauna contrary to the Fauna Act.

== Bibliography ==
- The Australian Institute of Aboriginal and Torres Strait Islander Studies. "Yanner v Eaton [1999] HCA 53; 201 CLR 351".
- Eaton v Yanner; ex parte Eaton [1998] QCA 20
- Nguyen, Thuy Hoai Anh (2015). "Case Note: Yanner v Eaton". Animal Law Case Book (1st ed.).
