= Murray Islands (Queensland) =

Archipelago in northern Queensland, Australia

Coordinates: 9°56′00″S 144°02′33″E

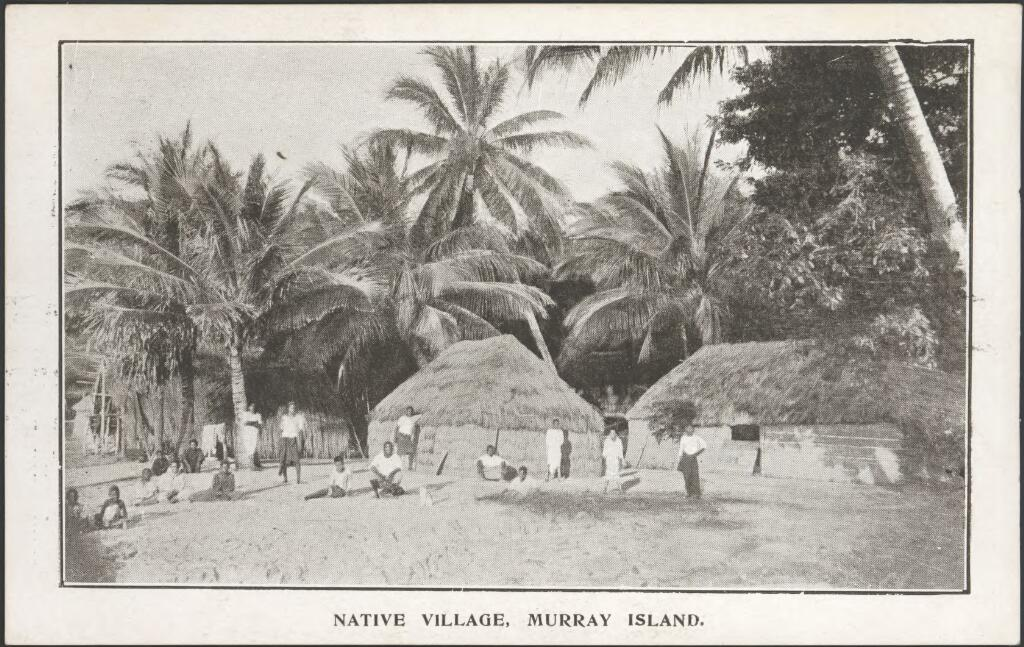
A "native village" on Murray aka Mer Island, photographed ca.1917-1920

Murray Islands are an island group in the Torres Strait, Queensland, Australia. The group consists of Murray Island (known traditionally as Mer Island), Daua Island and Waua Islet. The islands are within the Torres Strait Island Region local government area.

== History ==
The Island group was named in August 1791 by Captain Edward Edwards, commander of the Royal Navy vessel HMS Pandora.

== See also ==
- List of Torres Strait Islands
