= Australian storytelling =

Australia traditional storytelling, handed down from generation to generation, has always been part of the landscape. Since the beginning of time (the Dreaming) storytelling played a vital role in Australian Aboriginal culture, one of the world's oldest cultures. Aboriginal children were told stories from a very early age; stories that helped them understand the air, the land, the universe, their people, their culture, and their history. Elders told stories of their journeys and their accomplishments. As the children grew into adults they took on the responsibility of passing on the stories. These stories are as much a cultural necessity as they are entertainment and are still passed on orally though many are now recorded in print, audio and video.

== Aboriginal Australian storytelling ==
The Songlines, also called Dreaming tracks, were a form of Indigenous storytelling that brought about understanding of the landscape. They told stories about the path of a creator-spirit during the Dreaming. There is a large collection of stories from the Aboriginal Dreamtime that form a large part of Australian storytelling history. These include stories about the Bunyip.

== Settler stories ==
Europeans who arrived in Oceania as convicts, soldiers and settlers brought their own stories which were passed around Britain's new penal colony orally. For the 150.000 convicts transported to Australia in the late 18th and early 19th centuries who mostly belonged to the working class of England, Wales and Ireland, and were cut off from their home countries with little to no prospect of returning, these stories were a key component for their continuity in isolation as well as adapting into their new environment via establishing a cultural framework. As a result, by the 1820s, these narratives acculturated into local Australian experiences, forming a distinct and growing colonial culture.

An anti-authoritarian attitude emerged in their new culture which was often reflected in their stories. Some of the pain of abandonment was eased through the sharing of stories about bushrangers who dared to rob the rich and flout authority. One such bushranger was Ned Kelly who became a hero of the people and a legend in life and death. His is still one of the best known Australian stories.

Later, the prospectors who flooded Australian goldfields during the 1800s brought with them the stories they heard on the American goldfields. These stories soon took on an Australian flavour and became part of the country's folklore. Other stories, uniquely Australian, also sprang from the goldfields. One such story is the story of the Eureka Stockade—a miners' uprising on the Ballarat goldfields in 1854—said to be the start of democracy in Australia. New developments brought new stories; stories of pioneers who survived harsh conditions, stories of explorers such as Burke and Wills and stories of tragic shipwrecks. Events reported in newspapers were shared orally, and no doubt embellished.

== 20th-century stories ==
The Depression years of the 1930s brought the itinerant storyteller;the swagmen who carried the stories across the vast continent as they walked from town to town looking for work. Many of the swaggies became practised oral storytellers as, night after night, they camped on riverbanks and yarned by the fire. Well-known Australian storyteller Nell Bell remembers "my grandfather telling me about his mates, fencing contractors in northwest NSW, and my grandmother as she churned, telling me tales of leprechauns and willy willies. There were the Chinese market gardens at the top of the street with tales of emperors and peacocks; the tramp who lived under the bridge and told me tale after tale and the metho [methylated spirits] drinker with tales of America and the Outback. These were real folks, a purely Australian tradition."

One of the itinerant storytellers from the depression years was Henry Lawson, who was born on the goldfields—the son of a Norwegian seaman. He roamed the bush with the swagmen. Fame, though not fortune, came to him through his poems and short stories and when he died in 1922 he was honoured with a state funeral.

Many Australian stories, such as Lawson's "The Drover's Wife", developed in the distant and harsh conditions of the Australian bush where men and women would "wonder and fear". Sharing stories helped ease loneliness and homesickness, brought back memories of comfortable times and places and generated a feeling of togetherness against the wild unknown. The stories were told around the fire while the billy boiled; the fire and the stories combining to offer a feeling of security.

The war years (1914–18 and 1939–45) added another dimension to Australian folktales. New heroes began to emerge. From the First World War emerged the Anzacs and the story of Simpson and his donkey, and Sister Vivian Bullwinkel to name just a few.

After World War II the Jewish refugees from Eastern Europe and many other different ethnic groups have each added rich dimensions to Australian storytelling. Post-war affluence brought new mediums of entertainment and new ways of telling stories and the oral tradition was overlooked for many years.

== Storytelling Guilds ==
However, in the 1970s oral storytelling was given new life with the formation of storytelling guilds in Victoria and Western Australia and later in New South Wales and other states. In Australia today there are active guilds in Western Australia the Australian Capital Territory, New South Wales [http://www.storytellersnsw.org.au and South Australia.

The NSW Guild (Storytellers NSW) hosts live storytelling events as well as workshops on the art and craft of oral storytelling for members and the general public. They also host the biennial 'Weaving Stories Together' – Sydney International Storytelling Conference which draws participants and presenters from the Americas, Europe, Asia, the Pacific and Australasia. The last Conference was in June 2023.The next conference will be in June 2025. For more up to date information go to Storytellers NSW

The WA Storytelling Guild has an active membership which meets regularly for story sharing events and other guild business. The Guild also runs a yearly storytelling showcase for World Storytelling Day. The Showcase typically forms the basis for subsequent bookings at libraries, festivals and other community events.

== Storytellers ==
With the importance of oral literacy now being acknowledged by many Australian educators, oral storytellers have become a valuable resource for teachers. Many Victorian storytellers, such as JB Rowley, Gael Cresp, Jackie Kerin and others, are also successful authors. Another Australian storyteller, Louisa John-Krol, uses stories as a basis for her music.

The NSW Guild has many experienced storytellers who regularly tell stories or present workshops in a wide variety of settings such as: International Storytelling Festivals and Conferences, Education- University, Secondary, Primary and Early Childhood, Community & Environmental Festivals and at live stand-up storytelling events. The following tellers are accredited with the NSW Guild: Christine Carlton, Christine Greenough, Kiran Shah, Jo Henwood, Lindy Mitchell-Nilsson, Ulf Nilsson, Jill Webster, Michael Patterson, Lee Castledine, Lilli Rodriguez-Pang, Megan Pascoe, Anna Jarrat, Julie Mundy-Taylor, Sue Alvarez Cynthia Hartman and Kate Forsyth. Storytellers may be contacted through NSW Guild Tellers

Larry Brandy is an Aboriginal storyteller who specialises in involving his audience, using artefacts.
