= Dowar Islet, Queensland =

Dowar Islet
- Suburb
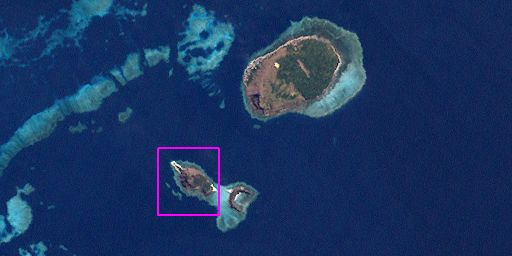
- Dowar Islet (in pink rectangle) as part of the Murray Islands

- Interactive map of Dowar Islet
- Coordinates: 9.9436°S 144.0263°E
- Country: Australia
- State: Queensland
- LGA: Torres Strait Island Region
- Location: 4.0 km (2.5 mi) SW of Mer Island (direct); 212 km (132 mi) NE of Thursday Island (direct); 795 km (494 mi) N of Cairns (direct); 2,167 km (1,347 mi) NNW of Brisbane (direct)

Government
  - State electorate: Cook
  - Federal division: Leichhardt

Area
  - Total: 0.5 km^{2} (0.19 sq mi)

Population
  - Total: 0 (2021 census)
  - Density: 0.0/km^{2} (0.0/sq mi)
- Time zone: UTC+10:00 (AEST)
- Postcode: 4875
Suburbs around Dowar Islet
Coral Sea	Coral Sea	Mer Island
Coral Sea	Dowar Islet	Coral Sea
Coral Sea	Coral Sea	Waua Islet

Dowar Islet is an island locality in the Torres Strait Island Region, Queensland, Australia. It consists of a single island, Daua Island (also known as Dowar Island) which is one of the Murray Islands group in the Torres Strait.

There are a few buildings on the island, but it is not developed. The island was declared a locality on 2 July 2010 and its postcode is 4875. In both the 2016 census and 2021 census, it had "no people or a very low population".

== See also ==
- List of Torres Strait Islands
