= Ugar Island, Queensland =

Ugar Island
- Suburb
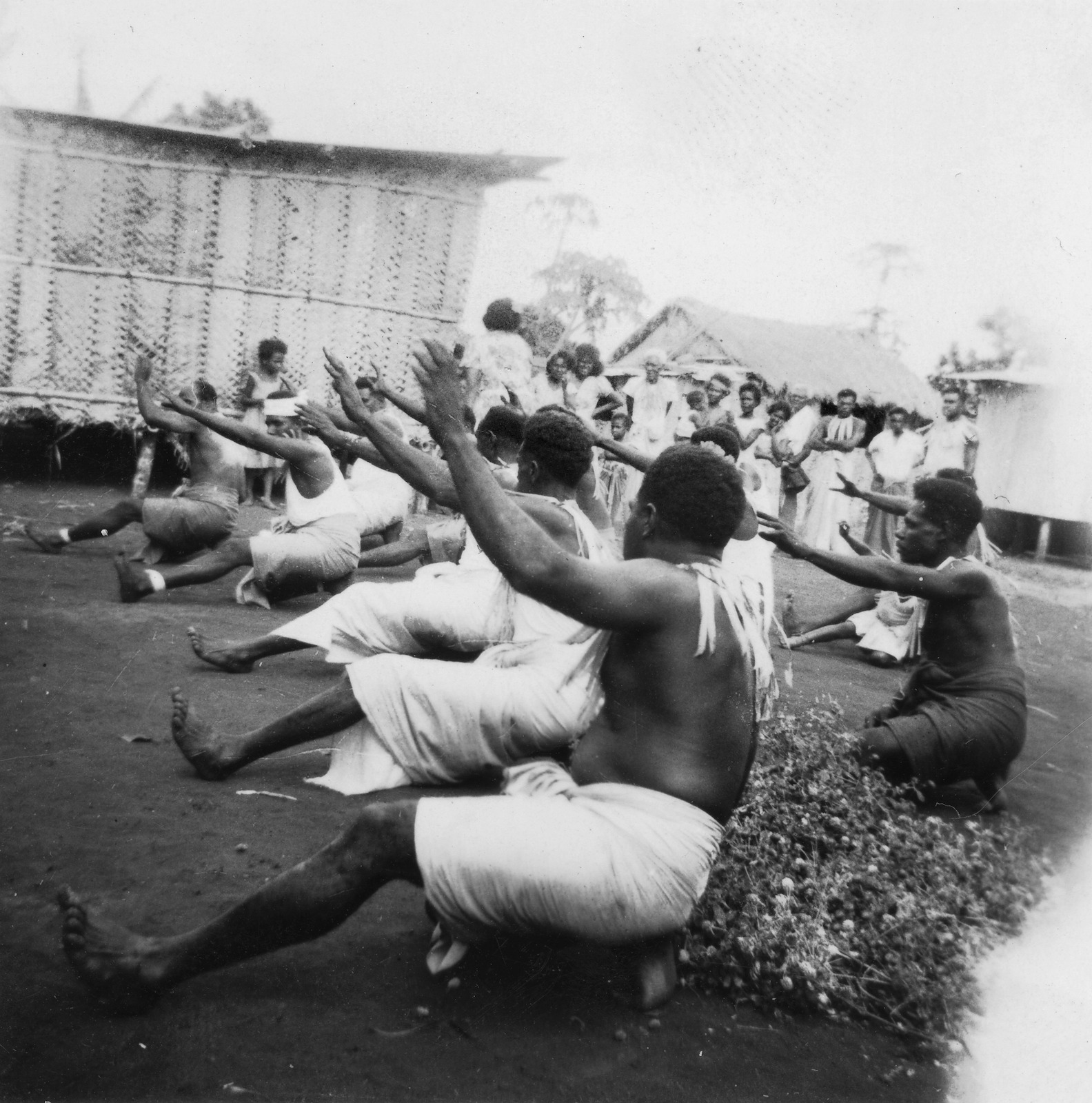
- Ugar Island dancers, 1958

- Interactive map of Ugar Island
- Coordinates: 9.5086°S 143.5452°E
- Country: Australia
- State: Queensland
- LGA: Torres Strait Island Region

Government
  - State electorate: Cook
  - Federal division: Leichhardt

Area
  - Total: 0.3 km^{2} (0.12 sq mi)

Population
  - Total: 69 (2021 census)
  - Density: 230/km^{2} (600/sq mi)
- Time zone: UTC+10:00 (AEST)
- Postcode: 4875

Ugar Island is an island locality in the Torres Strait Island Region, Queensland, Australia. It consists of a single island, Stephens Island in the Torres Strait. In the 2021 census, Ugar Island had a population of 69 people.

== Geography ==
The land use is residential with associated services and utilities. There is minimal other land use.

== Demographics ==
In the 2016 census, Ugar Island had a population of 85 people.

In the 2021 census, Ugar Island had a population of 69 people.

== Education ==
Stephen Island Campus is a primary (Early Childhood-6) campus of Tagai State College (9.5071°S 143.5471°E).

There are no secondary schools on the island. The secondary campus of Tagai State College in on Thursday Island, where boarding facilities are available. Other alternatives are distance education and other boarding schools.
