= Members of the Yorta Yorta Aboriginal Community v Victoria =

Judgement of the High Court of Australia

Member the Yorta Yorta Aboriginal Community v Victoria
- Court: High Court of Australia
- Decided: 12 December 2002
- Citations: [2002] HCA 58, (2002) 214 CLR 422
- Transcripts: 14 Dec [2001] HCATrans 657 Special Leave; 23 May [2002] HCATrans 251; 24 May [2002] HCATrans 252

Case history
- Prior actions: [1998] FCA 1606, Federal Court [2001] FCA 45, Federal Court (Full Court)

Court membership
- Judges sitting: Gleeson CJ, Gaudron, McHugh, Gummow, Kirby, Hayne and Callinan JJ

Case opinions
- (5:2) the finding that claimants had ceased to occupy lands in accordance with traditional laws and customs meant that their claim failed per Gleeson CJ, McHugh, Gummow, Hayne & Callinan JJ. Gaudron & Kirby JJ dissenting

Yorta Yorta v Victoria was a native title claim by the Yorta Yorta, an Aboriginal Australian people of north central Victoria. The claim was dismissed by Justice Olney of the Federal Court of Australia in 1998. Appeals to the Full Bench of the Federal Court of Australia in 2001 and the High Court of Australia in 2002 were also dismissed.

The determination by Justice Olney in 1998 ruled that the "tide of history" had "washed away" any real acknowledgement of traditional laws and any real observance of traditional customs by the applicants.

An appeal was made to the full bench of the Federal Court on the grounds that "the trial judge erroneously adopted a 'frozen in time' approach" and "failed to give sufficient recognition to the capacity of traditional laws and customs to adapt to changed circumstances". The Appeal was dismissed in a majority 2 to 1 decision.

The case was taken on appeal to the High Court of Australia but also dismissed in a 5 to 2 majority ruling in December 2002.

In consequence of the failed native title claim, in May 2004 the Victorian Government led by Premier Steve Bracks signed an historic co-operative management agreement with the Yorta Yorta people covering public land, rivers and lakes in north-central Victoria. The agreement gives the Yorta Yorta people a say in the management of traditional country including the Barmah State Park, Barmah Forest, Kow Swamp and public land along the Murray and Goulburn Rivers. Ultimate decision-making responsibility was retained by the Environment Minister.

== See also ==
- List of Australian Native Title court cases
