= Ron Merkel =

Australian jurist

Ronald Merkel KC is an Australian jurist, who was formerly a Judge of the Federal Court of Australia.

== Education ==
Merkel was educated at Melbourne High School and the University of Melbourne, where he obtained a Bachelor of Laws in 1963.

== Career ==
Merkel was admitted to the legal profession in March 1964 and was subsequently called to the bar in 1971. He was appointed Queen's Counsel in November 1982.

In 1985 Merkel, along with Uncle Jim Berg, and Ron Castan, sued the University of Melbourne and the Museum of Victoria for the return of their collections of Indigenous cultural material and through this act created the Koorie Heritage Trust. He served on the Federal Court of Australia between 5 February 1996 and 15 May 2006 after which he returned to the bar. He is known for "Shaw v Wolf" (1998), which dealt with the definition of people as Aboriginal or Torres Strait Islander for the purposes of applying the Aboriginal and Torres Strait Islander Commission Act 1989. He established three criteria to consider when determining whether a person is Aboriginal: descent, self-identification and community recognition. In December 2011, the Australian Human Rights Commission awarded him the 2011 Human Rights Medal for "his extensive human rights advocacy".
