= Native title in Australia =

Australian law recognising that Aboriginal peoples have rights to their traditional land

Native title is the set of rights, recognised by Australian law, held by Aboriginal and Torres Strait Islander groups or individuals to land that derive from their maintenance of their traditional laws and customs. These Aboriginal title rights were first recognised as a part of Australian common law with the decision of Mabo v Queensland (No 2) in 1992. The Native Title Act 1993 subsequently set out the processes for determining native title.

The Court's determination of native title recognises that a continued beneficial legal interest in land held by an Indigenous claim group over identified land survived the Crown's acquisition of radical title and sovereignty. Native title can co-exist with non-Aboriginal proprietary rights and in some cases different Aboriginal groups can exercise their native title rights over the same land.

The term native title can refer to the title held under traditional law and custom, as well as the common law recognition of that right.

An Aboriginal or Torres Strait Islander group ('claim group') lodges a native title claim over specified land in the Federal Court of Australia. The claim is referred to the National Native Title Tribunal (NNTT) that applies the "registration test" that determines whether a claim progresses. The relevant state or territory becomes a respondent to the claim, and any other interested parties will also join as respondents.

The Court hears applications for, and makes, native title determinations. Often determinations are resolved by consent between the parties. Appeals against these determinations can be made to a full sitting of the Federal Court and then to the High Court of Australia.

The NNTT, established under the Native Title Act 1993, also undertakes future act mediation and arbitral functions.

The Attorney-General's Department advises the Australian Government on legal and legal-policy regarding on native title, and assists the attorney-general to administer the Native Title Act 1993.

== Definitions: Native title/land rights ==
According to the Attorney-General's Department:

There are fundamental differences between land rights and native title. Land rights are rights created by the Australian, state or territory governments. Land rights usually consist of a grant of freehold or perpetual lease title to Indigenous Australians. By contrast, native title arises as a result of the recognition, under Australian common law, of pre-existing Indigenous rights and interests according to traditional laws and customs. Native title is not a grant or right created by governments.

For example, the Aboriginal Land Rights Act (Northern Territory) 1976 (see below) covers the granting of land to Aboriginal Land Trusts; setting up Aboriginal land councils; mineral rights; decision-making processes for dealing with land; dealing with income from land use agreements; and negotiations about leases for development on Aboriginal land in the Northern Territory. The Native Title Act 1993 (NTA) gives recognition that "Aboriginal and Torres Strait Islander people have rights to land, water and sea, including exclusive possession in some cases, but does not provide ownership". It allows for negotiations over land, but does not provide for a veto over development, and nor does it grant land, as the Aboriginal Land Rights (Northern Territory) Act (ALRA) does.

=== Native title definitions ===
National Native Title Tribunal definition:

[Native title is] the communal, group or individual rights and interests of Aboriginal people and Torres Strait Islander people in relation to land and waters, possessed under traditional law and custom, by which those people have a connection with an area which is recognised under Australian law (s 223 NTA).

Commonwealth Government's indigenous.gov.au website:

Native title is the recognition in Australian law, under common law and the Native Title Act 1993 (Cth), of Indigenous Australians' rights and interests in land and waters according to their own traditional laws and customs.

Native title has also been described as a "bundle of rights" in land, which may include such rights as camping, performing ceremony, etc. This description was found to be misleading in the 2025 High Court decision of Commonwealth v Yunupingu.

A native title determination relates to specific rights decided on a case-by-case basis.

== History ==
=== Pre-Mabo ===
==== 1971 – Milirrpum ====
Australia's first native title case was not decided until 1971. Emblematic of the problems Aboriginal people had in having their land claims recognised, in 1835, John Batman purported to sign Batman's Treaty with Aboriginal elders in the Port Phillip District. Governor Bourke declared Batman's Treaty was "void and of no effect as against the rights of the Crown" and declared any person on "vacant land of the Crown" without authorization from the Crown to be trespassing. The proclamation was approved by the Colonial Office. The official objection to the Treaty was that Batman had attempted to negotiate directly with the Aboriginal people, whom the British did not recognise as having any claim to any lands in Australia.

In 1971, in Milirrpum v Nabalco Pty Ltd (the "Gove Land Rights Case") in the Supreme Court of the Northern Territory, Justice Richard Blackburn explicitly rejected the concept of native title, ruling against the claimants on a number of issues of law and fact.

==== 1972–1976: Aboriginal Land Rights Act ====
In the wake of Milirrpum and the election of the Whitlam government in 1972, the Aboriginal Land Rights Commission (also known as the Woodward Royal Commission) was established in 1973 to inquire into appropriate ways to recognise Aboriginal land rights in the Northern Territory. Prime Minister Gough Whitlam introduced a new policy of Aboriginal self-determination, and initiatives such as the Aboriginal Land Fund and the National Aboriginal Consultative Committee was set up. The latter consisted of elected Aboriginal representatives, who would advise the Minister of Aboriginal Affairs. The Whitlam government introduced legislation later passed by the Fraser government as the Aboriginal Land Rights (Northern Territory) Act 1976, which established a procedure to transfer almost 50 per cent of land in the Northern Territory (around 600,000 km^{2}) to collective Aboriginal ownership. The Fraser government continued to implement many of the previous government's initiatives, under the description "self-management" rather than self-determination.

==== 1979 – Coe v Commonwealth ====
In 1979, Paul Coe, a Wiradjuri man from Cowra, New South Wales, commenced an action in the High Court of Australia arguing that Aboriginal people retained rights to land as an Aboriginal nation or nations existed pre-settlement and continues to exist, and that their land had been taken by conquest rather than by settlement. The court held in Coe v Commonwealth (1979) that no Aboriginal nation holds any kind of sovereignty, distinguishing the US case of Cherokee Nation v. Georgia (1831). However, the substantive issue of continuing land rights was not heard due to the lack of precision, vagueness and other serious deficiencies with the statement of claim presented to the court. Justice Gibbs said, at paragraph 21, "The question what rights the aboriginal people of this country have, or ought to have, in the lands of Australia is one which has become a matter of heated controversy. If there are serious legal questions to be decided as to the existence or nature of such rights, no doubt the sooner they are decided the better, but the resolution of such questions by the courts will not be assisted by imprecise, emotional or intemperate claims. In this, as in any other litigation, the claimants will be best served if their claims are put before the court dispassionately, lucidly and in proper form".

==== 1981 – Pitjantjatjara Yankunytjatjara Land Rights Act ====
The South Australian Anangu Pitjantjatjara Yankunytjatjara Land Rights Act 1981 was introduced by Premier Don Dunstan in November 1978, several months prior to his resignation from Parliament. An amended bill, following extensive consultation, was passed by the Tonkin Liberal government in March 1981. This legislation gave significant rights well in advance of any other to date in Australia. In 1981, SA Premier Tonkin returned 102,650 square kilometres (39,630 mi^{2}) of land (10.2% of the state's land area) to the Pitjantjara and Yankunytjatjara people. However, it did not give the people the power of veto over mining activities; any disputes would need to be resolved by an independent arbitrator.

In 1984 Premier John Bannon's Labor government passed legislation to return lands to the Maralinga Tjarutja people. The legislation was proclaimed in January 1985 and was followed by a ceremony in the desert attended by Maralinga Tjarutja leader Archie Barton, John Bannon and Aboriginal Affairs Minister Greg Crafter. This granted rights over 75,000 square kilometres (29,000 mi^{2}) of land in the Great Victoria Desert, including the land contaminated by the British nuclear weapons testing at Maralinga.

=== Mabo and the Native Title Act ===
==== 1988–1992 – Mabo ====
Mabo v Queensland (No 2) (1992) established the foundation for native title in Australia. In 1992 the rejection of native title in Milirrpum v Nabalco was overruled by the High Court in Mabo v Queensland (No 2), which recognised the Meriam people of Murray Island (Mer) in the Torres Strait as native title holders over part of their traditional lands. The Court rejected the notion that all Indigenous rights to land were abolished upon acquisition of sovereignty over Australia. The Court held that native title rights continued to exist, and that these rights existed by virtue of the continuing connection of Indigenous People to land, independent from a grant from the Crown. Native title would continue to exist as long as traditional laws and customs continue to be observed, unless the rights were otherwise extinguished by an incompatible grant by the Crown. Justice Gerard Brennan delivered the lead judgment in this landmark decision, stating:

However, when the tide of history has washed away any real acknowledgment of traditional law and any real observance of traditional customs, the foundation of native title has disappeared. Thus although over some parts of Australia native title has been lost, in large areas of the nation's interior, native title could be recognised.

As Justice Brennan stated in Mabo (No. 2), "native title has its origin and is given its content by the traditional laws acknowledged by and the customs observed by the Aboriginal inhabitants of a territory".

==== 1993 – Native Title Act 1993 ====
One year after the recognition of the legal concept of native title in Mabo (No 2), the Keating government formalised the recognition by legislation with the enactment by the Australian Parliament of the Native Title Act 1993. The Act attempted to clarify the legal position of landholders and the processes to be followed for native title to be claimed, protected and recognised through the courts. The Act also established the National Native Title Tribunal.

=== Wik and 1998 amendment ===
==== 1996 – Wik ====
After the Mabo decision it was uncertain as to whether the granting of pastoral leases would extinguish native title. The Wik Decision in 1996 clarified the uncertainty. The court found that the statutory pastoral leases (which cover some 40% of the Australian land mass) under consideration by the court did not bestow rights of exclusive possession on the leaseholder. As a result, native title rights could co-exist, depending on the terms and nature of the particular pastoral lease. Where there was a conflict of rights, the rights under the pastoral lease would prevail over native title rights.

==== 1998 – Native Title Amendment Act 1998 ====
The Wik decision led to amendments to the Native Title Act 1993 by the Native Title Amendment Act 1998. This Act contained then Prime Minister John Howard's "10 Point Plan" to counter the effects of the Wik Decision. The amending Act was introduced by the Howard government. The amendments substantially restricted native title by narrowing the right to negotiate and extinguishing native title on most pastoral and mining leases granted before 1994.

=== Cases after the 1998 amendment ===
==== 1998–2002 – Yorta Yorta ====
Yorta Yorta v Victoria, dismissed a native title claim by the Yorta Yorta Aboriginal people of north central Victoria, on appeal from a decision of Justice Olney of the Federal Court in 1998. An appeal to the Full Bench of the Federal Court in 2001, had also been dismissed.

The determination by Justice Olney in 1998 ruled that the 'tide of history' had 'washed away' any real acknowledgement of traditional laws and any real observance of traditional customs by the applicants. The 2002 High Court decision adopted strict requirements of continuity of traditional laws and customs for native title claims to succeed.

==== 1998–2003 – Miriuwung Gajerrong ====
Ward v Western Australia (1998) addressed an application made on behalf of the Miriuwung and Gajerrong people of the east Kimberly, over land in Western Australia and the Northern Territory. Justice Malcolm Lee of the Federal Court ruled in their favour in recognition of the native title. Western Australia appealed the decision to the Full Court of the Federal Court, then to the High Court.

The High Court held in Western Australia v Ward that native title is a bundle of rights, which may be extinguished one by one, for example, by a mining lease. In this case, the lease did not confer 'exclusive possession', because the claimants could pass over the land and do various things. But some parts of native title rights were extinguished, including the rights to control access and make use of the land.

The claim was remitted to the Full Court of the Federal Court to determine in accordance with the decision of the High Court. The claimants reached an agreement about the claim area and a determination was made in 2003. "Exclusive possession native title was recognised over Lacrosse Island, Kanggurru Island, Aboriginal reserves within the Kununurra townsite, Glen Hill pastoral lease and Hagan Island. Non-exclusive rights were recognised over a number of areas including islands in Lake Argyle."

==== 2001 – Yarmirr ====
Yarmirr v Northern Territory (2001) addressed an application made on behalf of a number of clan groups of Aboriginal people for an area of seas and sea-beds surrounding Croker Island in the Northern Territory. It was the first judgment by the High Court of native title over waters. The judge, Olney J, determined that members of the Croker Island community have a native title right to have free access to the sea and sea-bed of the claimed area for a number of purposes. The case established that traditional owners do have native title of the sea and sea-bed; however common law rights of fishing and navigation mean that only non-exclusive native title can exist over the sea. The decision paved the way for other native title applications involving waters to proceed.

==== 2002 and 2004 – Nangkiriny ====
Nangkiriny v State of Western Australia (2002 and 2004), in which John Dudu Nangkiriny and others were plaintiffs, were cases addressing the claims of the Karajarri people in the Kimberley region, south of Broome. Land rights were recognised over 31,000 square kilometres (12,000 mi^{2}) of land (half the size of Tasmania) via an ILUA on 5 July 2011.

==== 2004 – Maralinga ====
In May 2004, following the passage of special legislation, South Australian Premier Mike Rann handed back title to 21,000 square kilometres of land to the Maralinga Tjarutja and Pila Nguru people. The land, 1,000 kilometres (620 mi) north-west of Adelaide and abutting the Western Australia border, was then called the Unnamed Conservation Park. It is now known as Mamungari Conservation Park. It includes the Serpentine Lakes, and was the largest land return since 1984. At the 2004 ceremony Rann said the return of the land fulfilled a promise he made to Archie Barton in 1991 when he was Aboriginal Affairs Minister, after he passed legislation to return lands including the sacred Ooldea area (which also included the site of Daisy Bates' mission camp) to the Maralinga Tjarutja people. The Maralinga Tjarutja lands now total 102,863 square kilometres.

==== 2005 – Wotjobaluk, Jaadwa, Jadawadjali, Wergaia and Jupagalk ====
The Aboriginal peoples of the Wimmera region of Western Victoria won recognition of their native title on 13 December 2005 after a ten-year legal process commenced in 1995 when they filed an application for a determination of native title in respect of certain land and waters in Western Victoria. It was the first successful native title claim in south-eastern Australia and in Victoria, determined by Justice Ron Merkel involving Wotjobaluk, Jaadwa, Jadawadjali, Wergaia and Jupagalk people. In his reasons for judgment Justice Merkel explained the significance of his orders:

The orders I propose to make are of special significance as they constitute the first recognition and protection of native title resulting in the ongoing enjoyment of native title in the State of Victoria and, it would appear, on the South-Eastern seaboard of Australia. These are areas in which the Aboriginal peoples suffered severe and extensive dispossession, degradation and devastation as a consequence of the establishment of British sovereignty over their lands and waters during the 19th century.

==== 2005 – Noongar ====
In 2005 the Federal Court brought down a judgment recognising the native title of the Noongar people over the Perth metropolitan area. Justice Wilcox found that native title continues to exist within an area in and around Perth. It was the first judgment recognising native title over a capital city and its surroundings. The claim area itself is part of a much larger area included in the "Single Noongar Claim", covering the south-western corner of Western Australia. An appeal was subsequently lodged and in 2008 the Full Court of the Federal Court upheld parts of the appeal by the Western Australian and Commonwealth governments against Justice Wilcox's judgment.

==== 2008 – Blue Mud Bay sea rights ====
The 2008 decision by the High Court decided the Blue Mud Bay sea rights case, establishing a precedent for sea rights over an intertidal zone for the first time. The Yolngu people of Baniyala were involved in this case, which involved Blue Mud Bay in East Arnhem Land.

=== 2007 and 2009 amendments ===
In 2007 the Howard government passed the Native Title Amendment Act 2007, and the Native Title Amendment (Technical Amendments) Act 2007, a package of coordinated measures and technical amendments to improve the performance of the native title system. These are aimed at making the native title process more efficient and to speed up the determination of whether native title exists on the 580 claims that had been registered but not yet determined.

The Native Title Act 1993 was further amended by the Rudd government by the Native Title Amendment Act 2009. It allows the Federal Court to determine who may mediate a claim, whether that be the court itself, the Native Title Tribunal, or otherwise.

=== Further significant determinations ===
==== 2008–2019 – Timber Creek ====
Northern Territory v Mr Griffiths and Lorraine Jones was a 2018 High Court of Australia case, ruled in 2019, regarding land around Timber Creek, Northern Territory, involving a compensation claim by Ngaliwurru and Nungali lands surrounding Timber Creek. It related to various earlier cases since 1997. Described as "the most significant [case] ... since Mabo", the High Court ruled for the first time on compensation for the extinguishment of native title in Australia. It is considered a "landmark" native title case, because the clauses contained within the Native Title Act 1993 pertaining to the determination of compensation payable due to the extinguishment of native title had never been heard before in the High Court.

==== 2020 – Yamatji ====
Yamatji Marlpa Aboriginal Corporation was involved in a large native title claim from 1996, based on the Native Title Act 1993, resulting in an historic determination in February 2020, involving both native title and an ILUA, covering an area of 48,000 square kilometres (19,000 sq mi) in Western Australia.

==== 2020 – Gurindji, Wave Hill Station ====
A claim was lodged in 2016 by the Central Land Council on behalf of the Gurindji peoples in the area, as there were mining interests in area covered by Wave Hill Station's pastoral lease. On 8 September 2020, the Federal Court of Australia recognised the native title rights of the Gurindji people to 5,000 square kilometres (1,900 sq mi) of the Wave Hill Station, allowing them to receive royalties as compensation from resource companies who explore the area. Justice Richard White said that the determination recognised Indigenous involvement (Jamangku, Japuwuny, Parlakuna-Parkinykarni and Yilyilyimawu peoples) with the land "at least since European settlement and probably for millennia". The court sitting took place nearly 800 kilometres (500 mi) south of Darwin, and descendants of Vincent Lingiari and others involved in the Wave Hill walk-off celebrated the determination. The owners will participate in the mining negotiations and exploration work, from which royalties may flow in the future, but just as important is the right to hunt, gather, teach and perform cultural activities and ceremonies, and allow the young people to connect with their land.

==== 2023 – Eastern Maar ====
In March 2023, 8578.35 kilometres along the coast of the Grey River in Victoria. The case was the first Native Title case heard in the state of Victoria for 10 years. At the Federal Court at Warrnambool designated the land as native title rights.

==== 2025 – Gove Peninsula ====
In 2019, Galarrwuy Yunupingu brought a native title claim against the Australian Government on behalf of the Gumatj peoples of the Northern Territory. He sought financial compensation over the acquisition of land on the Gove Peninsula, which was obtained by the government without the consent of the traditional owners, which were transmuted into bauxite mines. The Federal Court of Australia ruled in favour of the Gumatj people in 2023, finding that their land was not acquired "on just terms" before being leased to mining consortium Nabalco in 1968. This was upheld on appeal by the High Court of Australia in March 2025. The matter of how much compensation, and to whom it should be paid, was not included in the judgment, and it is likely to be some years before agreement is reached. Mediation overseen by an experienced retired Federal Court Judge and a Federal Court Registrar began in August 2025, to try to reach agreement among various Indigenous parties to identify those who hold native title to the claim areas, and is expected to be complete in January 2026.

The decision potentially makes the Commonwealth liable to claims of compensation for decisions made which extinguished native title claims for territories under its administration.

== Native title rights and interests ==
Native title concerns the interaction of two systems of law:

- The traditional laws and customs that regulated the lives of Aboriginal and Torres Strait Islanders prior to the colonisation of Australia by the British ("Aboriginal customary law").
- The English-derived legal system, which was brought to Australia with colonisation, which includes the common law and enacted laws ("Australian law"). As Australia was (and remains) designated as a "settled" colony, the laws of England were imported with any local laws not recognised (as they would be in "conquered" or "ceded" colonies).

Native title is the term adopted in Australian law to describe the rights to land and waters possessed by Indigenous Australians under their customary laws that are recognised by the Australian legal system. Native title is able to be possessed by a community or individual depending on the content of the traditional laws and customs; it is inalienable other than by surrender to the Crown; and rights over the land may range from access and usage rights to rights of exclusive possession. Native title rights and interests are based on laws and customs that pre-date the British acquisition of sovereignty; they are distinct from the rights granted by government such as statutory land rights of the kind found in the Land Rights Act. Native title rights and interests may exist over land and waters to the extent that they are consistent with other rights established over the land by law or executive action.

According to the National Native Title Tribunal (2013): "The native title rights and interests held by particular Aboriginal people will depend on both their traditional laws and customs and what interests are held by others in the area concerned. Generally speaking, native title must give way to the rights held by others. The capacity of Australian law to recognise the rights and interests held under traditional law and custom will also be a factor... The source of native title is the system of traditional laws and customs of the native title holders themselves." Native title rights and interests may include the right to live in an area or to access it for traditional purposes; to visit and protect sacred sites; to hunt, fish or gather resources; or to teach law and custom. Exclusive possession can only be recognised over certain parts of Australia, such as vacant Crown land, or areas already held by Indigenous Australians.

A 2015 review of the Native Title Act by the Australian Law Reform Commission reported that "Courts have indicated that native title is not to be understood in terms equivalent to common law property interests, but they often still tend to draw on these concepts... The prevailing view of the nature and content of native title is hybrid, drawing on traditional laws and customs for content, but also at times idiosyncratically adopting common law terms to describe the nature or character of the rights". It is a complex area of law. The Act continues to be reviewed and amended.

== Native title determinations ==
The National Native Title Register (NNTR), maintained by the NNTT, is a register of approved native title determinations. A determination can be that native title does or does not exist. As part of the determination of native title, native title groups are required to nominate a Native Title Prescribed Body Corporate to hold (as trustee) or manage (as agent) their native title. Following a determination, Prescribed Bodies Corporate are entered onto the NNTR. At this point, the corporation becomes a Registered Native Title Body Corporate (RNTBC).

On 1 July 2011, the 160 registered determinations of native title covered some 1,228,373 km^{2} (474,277 sq mi) (approximately 16 per cent) of the land mass of Australia; and registered Indigenous land use agreements (ILUAs) covered about 1,234,129 km^{2} (476,500 sq mi) (about 16 per cent) of the land mass, as well as about 5,435 km^{2} (2,098 sq mi) of sea.

== Mediation ==
Native title in Australia frequently involves mediation between native title parties and other groups with an interest in native title, such as the Australian Government, state and territory governments, miners and pastoralists. Amendments to the NTA made in 2012 meant that the NNTT would henceforth only conduct native title claim mediation by referral from the Federal Court, which may also order mediation by other agencies or persons. The purpose of mediation is to assist parties to clarify the issues in dispute, to explore options for settlement and to reach agreement. Mediation is a structured process, with the intention of a mutually agreed outcome rather than having a decision imposed by a judge.

== Alternative agreements ==
Alternative settlements (also termed "broader settlements") may be negotiated out of court, often being resolved more quickly and efficiently than via the court process under the Native Title Act. They can give traditional owner group recognition in areas where native title rights have been extinguished, or where it is difficult for a group to prove that it persists. Such agreements are resolved through negotiation, and recognition of traditional ownership and various other land rights in land may be achieved without an actual native title determination. Examples of such arrangements are the Indigenous land use agreement or, in Victoria, a settlement under the Traditional Owner Settlement Act 2010 (TOSA).

Alternative settlements agreements can be made alongside the Native Title Act, but usually the traditional owners are required to withdraw any existing native title claims. Such settlements can include any matters agreed to by all parties, which may included recognition of traditional owner rights, grants of freehold for specified purposes, or the right to be consulted and participate in natural resource management.

=== Types ===
==== ILUAs ====
An Indigenous land use agreement (ILUA) is a voluntary agreement between a native title group and others about the use of land and waters, provided for under the Act. They must be about native title matters, but can include other matters. They enable people to negotiate flexible and pragmatic agreements to suit their particular circumstances.

An ILUA may exist over areas where native title has, or has not yet, been determined; may be entered into regardless of whether there is a native title claim over the area or not; and may be part of a native title determination, or settled separately from a native title claim. An ILUA is binding between a native title group or Registered Native Title Body Corporate/s (RNTBC) and other parties, and bind all persons holding native title in the area of the ILUA, regardless of whether they are parties or not.

ILUAs are an alternative to making an application for native title determination, generally processed within less than six months, and may deal with a wide range of issues, including such topics as:

- native title holders agreeing to a future development;
- how native title rights coexist with the rights of other people;
- access to an area;
- protection of sacred sites
- extinguishment of native title;
- compensation;
- employment and economic opportunities for native title groups;
- cultural heritage; and
- mining.

There are three types of ILUAs: Body Corporate Agreements, Area Agreements and Alternative Procedure Agreements.

==== TOSA settlements (Vic.) ====
The Traditional Owner Settlement Act 2010 (TOSA) "provides for an out-of-court settlement of native title. The Act allows the Victorian Government to recognise traditional owners and certain rights in Crown land. In return for entering into a settlement, traditional owners must agree to withdraw any native title claim, pursuant to the Native Title Act 1993 (Cth) and not to make any future native title claims".

=== Traditional owner ===
Alternative agreements require that the claimants demonstrate that they are the "traditional owners" (or "traditional custodians") of the country in question. However, this term has sometimes proved problematic in law: it is not mentioned in the NTA, but Indigenous Land Use Agreements (see below), which are provided for under the Act, require that the Indigenous group or groups party to the agreement assert "traditional ownership" of the area.

The definition of the term "traditional owner" varies among jurisdictions. According to the Aboriginal Land Rights Act 1976, the term refers to "a local descent group of Aboriginals who: (a) have common spiritual affiliations to a site on the land, being affiliations that place the group under a primary spiritual responsibility for that site and for the land; and (b) are entitled by Aboriginal tradition to forage as of right over that land". A similar definition was incorporated in the Environment Protection and Biodiversity Conservation Act 1999 (EPBC), but legislation differed in various states, such as the South Australian legislation referring to an "Aboriginal person who has, in accordance with Aboriginal tradition, social, economic and spiritual affiliations with, and responsibilities for, the lands or any part of them".

A further complexity is introduced in a form of ranking of rights, for example in New South Wales, a traditional owner must be both born in the country and have a cultural association with the land. Peter Sutton distinguishes between "core" and "contingent" rights, which he says are recognised among most Aboriginal peoples. So there are sometimes challenges in finding "the right people for the right country", complicated by the fact that there are cases where both primary and secondary rights holders are described by the term. Distinguishing between "historical people" and others who have been custodians of the land for many generations add to the complexity. In the case of some agreements, historical people may be recognised as parties even when they don't have "traditional" associations with the land.

The term Traditional Owner Corporation (TOC) is used to refer to various types of Aboriginal and Torres Strait Islander corporations. Such a corporation is usually the negotiating body when determining native title outcomes. (A TOC is distinct from the Registered Native Title Body Corporate (RNTBC), which manages the land after a native title determination has been made.)

In Victoria, a "traditional owner group" is defined in the Traditional Owner Settlement Act 2010 to include those people recognised by the Attorney-General as traditional owners, based on their traditional and cultural associations with the land, and there are government guidelines detailing what these terms mean. They state that traditional "Denotes linkages with the past that are actively kept alive by the traditional owner group members. It is not restricted to features or activities understood to be fully continuous with, and identical to, such activities or features in pre-contact Aboriginal society".

Apart from the legal definitions, the terms traditional owners or traditional custodians of the land are included in Acknowledgment of Country wording which is used to pay respects to the people of that Country.

In some cases, agreements between resource companies and Traditional Owner groups predate the recognition of Native Title under Australian law. In the Pilbara region of Western Australia, the Woodside-operated North West Shelf project was developed without any agreements with Traditional Owner groups. However, following the introduction of the Native Title Act in 1993, a Land Access agreement was executed between Elders of the Ngarluma and Yindjibarndi people and the North West Shelf project joint venturers. This is an example of a pre-Native Title agreement that has remained in place following the introduction of the Native Title Act. The Agreement party, the Ngarluma Yindjibarndi Foundation (NYFL), has represented Traditional Owner interests for the North West Shelf project area since execution of the agreement. NYFL CEO Sean-Paul Stephens and Yindjibarndi Elder Michael Woodley, on behalf of the NYFL Board of Traditional Owners, have set out major reforms required to ensure such agreements ensure a legacy following decades of industry profits alongside extreme economic poverty across the Traditional Owner community.

=== Examples of alternative settlements ===
- South West Native Title Settlement for Noongar people in Western Australia aims to resolve native title claims in exchange for statutory recognition of the Noongar people as the traditional owners of south-Western Australia. As of 2020 it is the largest native title settlement in Australian history, affecting about 30,000 Noongar people and encompassing around 200,000 km^{2} (77,000 sq mi) in south-western Western Australia. It has been described as "Australia's first treaty".
- An Indigenous Land Use Agreement (ILUA) was agreed with the Kaurna Yerta Aboriginal Corporation (KYAC) in Adelaide, South Australia and effected on 19 November 2018.

== By state and territory ==
=== ACT ===
No native title claim has ever been determined in the ACT, because of the lack of historical records enabling such a determination to be made.

=== South Australia ===
An Indigenous Land Use Agreement (ILUA) was agreed with the Kaurna Yerta Aboriginal Corporation (KYAC) and effected on 19 November 2018. The agreement was among the South Australian government, the federal government and the Kaurna people, with formal recognition coming after the Federal Court judgment, 18 years after lodgement. This was the first claim for a first land use agreement to be agreed to in any Australian capital city. The rights cover Adelaide's whole metropolitan area and includes "17 parcels of undeveloped land not under freehold". Some of the land is Crown land, some belongs to the state government and some is private land owned by corporations. Justice Debra Mortimer said it would be "the first time in Australia that there [had] been a positive outcome within the area of (native title) determination".

=== Victoria ===
As of 2020, four native title claims have been determined in Victoria; three of them resulted in the recognition of native title by agreement via a consent determination in the Federal Court. In Yorta Yorta v Victoria (see above) in 2003, native title was determined not to exist by the Federal Court. The native title determinations are:

- Wotjobaluk, Jaadwa, Jadawadjali, Wergaia and Yupagalk Peoples (known as the "Wimmera claim – see above) (2005)
- Gunditjmara People (2007)
- Gunaikurnai People (October 2010)

Although the Yorta Yorta people's claim did not meet the legal standard for native title under the Act, in 2004 the Victorian Government entered into a Cooperative Management Agreement with the Yorta Yorta Nation Aboriginal Corporation, which was the first Victorian agreement reached outside the native title process, and applies to designated areas of Crown land in north central Victoria, with direct engagement between Yorta Yorta, Parks Victoria and the Department of Environment, Land, Water and Planning (DELWP). In October 2010, the State entered into a Traditional Owner Land Management Agreement with the Yorta Yorta, which established the Yorta Yorta Traditional Owner Land Management Board to jointly manage Barmah National Park (a TOSA settlement, under the Traditional Owner Settlement Act 2010).

=== Western Australia ===
An alternative settlement, the South West Native Title Settlement for Noongar people in Western Australia, aims to resolve native title claims in exchange for statutory recognition of the Noongar people as the traditional owners of south-Western Australia. As of 2020 it is the largest native title settlement in Australian history, affecting about 30,000 Noongar people and encompassing around 200,000 km^{2} (77,000 sq mi) in south-western Western Australia. It has been described as "Australia's first treaty".

The Noongar (Koorah, Nitja, Boordahwan) (Past, Present, Future) Recognition Act 2016 recognises Noongar ownership, and the settlement includes six individual Indigenous Land Use Agreements (ILUAs). On 19 December 2019, the Federal Court upheld the Native Title Registrar's decision to register the six ILUAs, and settlement is expected to begin in the second half of 2020.

== National Native Title Council ==
The National Native Title Council (NNTC) is a not-for-profit organisation whose website states that it is the "peak body for the native title sector". Its members include regional Native Title Representative Bodies (NTRBs), Native Title Service Providers (NTSPs), local Prescribed Body Corporates (PBCs) and Traditional Owner Corporations (TOCs).

As of 2025, Jamie Lowe is CEO of the council. He is also inaugural co-chair of the board of the Mabo Centre, established in Perth in March 2025.

== Human rights reports ==
Under the Native Title Act 1993, the Aboriginal and Torres Strait Islander Social Justice Commissioner was required to prepare an annual report to the Attorney-General on the operation of the NTA and its effect on the exercise and enjoyment of human rights of Aboriginal and Torres Strait Islander peoples, and to report on other matters as and when requested by the Attorney-General.

The objectives of the Commissioner were to provide and promote a human rights perspective on native title; to assist in developing more efficient native title processes; and to advocate for the co-existence between Indigenous and non-Indigenous interests in land based on compatible land use. All of the reports from 1994 to 2016 have been published online. Changes brought about by the Human Rights Legislation Amendment Act 2017 removed the statutory obligation for an annual Social Justice and Native Title Report such as those produced up to and including 2016.

== See also ==
- Aboriginal land rights in Australia
- Australian Aboriginal sovereignty
- Australians for Native Title and Reconciliation
- List of Australian native title court cases
- List of native title claims in South Australia
- Mabo Centre
- Native title legislation in Australia
- Outstation movement
