= Oonooraba =

Historic villa in Queensland, Australia

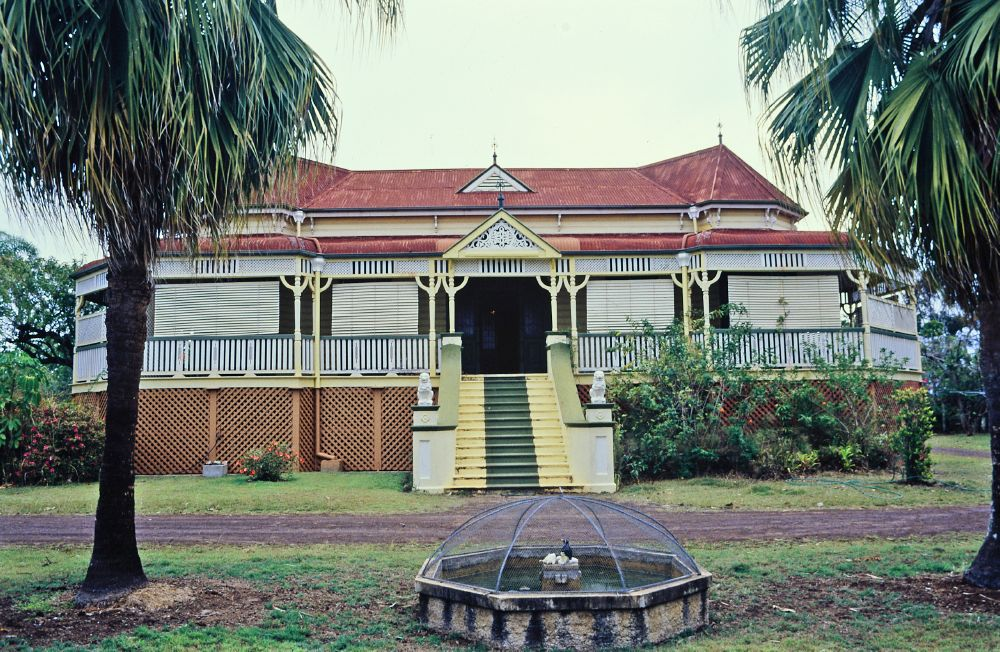
- Oonooraba, 1997

- Location within Queensland Location within Australia
- 25.5378°S 152.6872°E
- Location: 50 Pallas Street, Maryborough, Fraser Coast Region, Queensland, Australia

History
- Design period: 1870s–1890s (late 19th century)
- Built: c. 1892–

Site notes
- Architectural styles: Victorian Filigree, Queenslander

Queensland Heritage Register
- Official name: Oonooraba
- Type: state heritage (built, landscape)
- Designated: 21 October 1992
- Reference no.: 600707
- Significant period: 1890s–1930s (fabric, historical)
- Significant components: decorative features, bathroom/bathhouse, residential accommodation – main house, lead light/s, steps/stairway, decorative finishes, basement / sub-floor, statue, furniture/fittings, trees/plantings, kitchen/kitchen house, garden/grounds

Oonooraba is a heritage-listed villa at 50 Pallas Street, Maryborough, Fraser Coast Region, Queensland, Australia. It was built from c. 1892 onwards. It was added to the Queensland Heritage Register on 21 October 1992.

== History ==
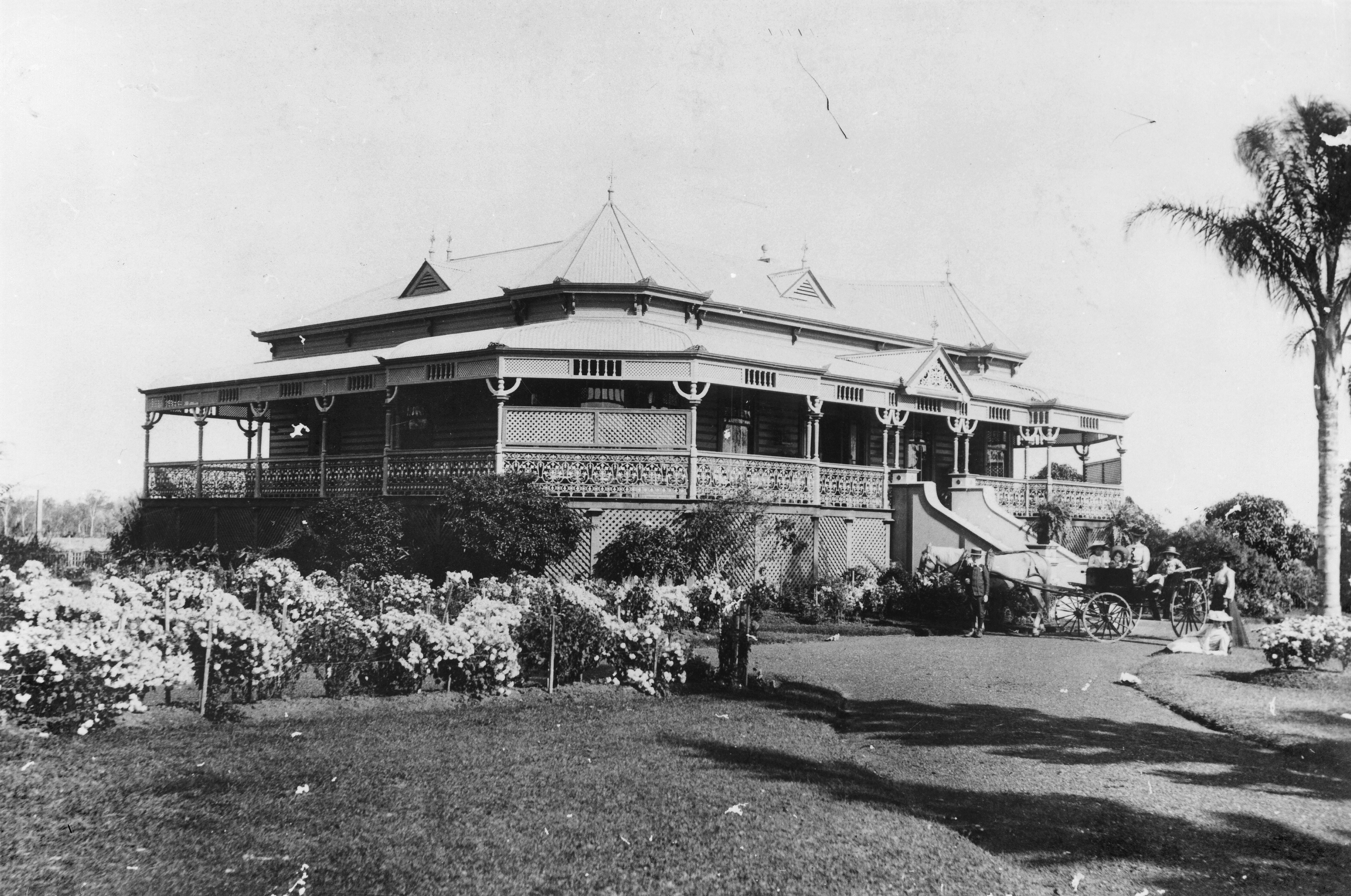
Oonooraba, circa 1905

Oonooraba was built in about 1892 to the design of prominent architect, George Henry Male Addison, for a prominent Maryborough citizen, James Malcolm Stafford. The house was supposedly built on the site of an early Aboriginal meeting place.

The original township of Maryborough was situated, not in its current place, but on the north of the Mary River, after wharves were established in 1847–48 providing transport for wool from sheep stations on the Burnett River. In 1850 Surveyor, Hugh Roland Labatt arrived in Maryborough with instructions to "examine the River Mary...to suggest ...the best site or sites for the laying out of the town, having regard to the convenience of shipping on one hand and internal communication on the other...also...point out the spots desirable as reserves for public building, church, quay and for places for public recreation." The site recommended by Labatt was not where settlement was established but further east and from the early 1850s this is where the growing town developed.

The land on which Oonooraba was built was part of a ten-acre lot, described as Suburban Section 29, which was first purchased by a William MacAdam of Maryborough on 20 September 1859. The land was apparently left undeveloped, and in 1886 the ten-acre lot was acquired by George Ambrose White, who subdivided the land and offered for sale the smaller lots of land.

After the subdivisions James Malcolm Stafford a Maryborough solicitor, bought six acres of Suburban Section 29 in three purchases. The first, subdivision one of 2 acres (0.81 ha), was purchased on 2 November 1889 from Otto Dias who had purchased the lot from White the year before. Next, Stafford purchased one acre described as resubdivsion 1 of subdivision 2 on 12 November 1889. On 21 September 1892 Stafford's wife, Jessie Wilson Stafford, purchased three more acres of Section 29. Presumably at about this date, after obtaining a six-acre lot, the Stafford's had their house Oonooraba built. There is evidence that the house was constructed by 1895.

James Malcolm Stafford was practising as a solicitor in Maryborough from about 1883, after having practicing in Brisbane. He was born on 25 June 1859 in Ipswich and was educated and articled in that town. He was admitted as a solicitor in Brisbane on 7 March 1882 and practiced there before moving to Maryborough by about 1885 where he established a successful practice. He was elected to the position of Mayor of Maryborough in 1892 and retained this role until about 1896. Stafford died on 4 April 1900. In about 1892, Stafford commissioned George Henry Male Addison to design his one-storeyed timber residence in Maryborough.

Addison was an important Queensland architect, who trained in England before emigrating to Melbourne in 1883 and joined the prominent Victorian architectural firm, Terry and Oakden. He became a partner and the chief draftsman and was a founding member of the Melbourne Art Society. He arrived in Brisbane in November 1886 to supervise construction of the London Chartered Bank of Australia building there which Terry, Oakden and Addison, as they were now known, had designed. He remained in Brisbane undertaking work as the northern partner of the firm, which again changed name and became Oakden, Addison and Kemp in 1887. In April 1892 he assumed responsibility for the Brisbane office of Anglican Diocesan architect, JH Buckeridge who had moved to Sydney. Addison left the partnership and practiced on his own until 1898 and formed several other partnerships in the early twentieth century. Addison designed many landmark buildings in Queensland, including the Exhibition Building of 1892 (now known as the Old Museum); The Mansions in George Street and the Albert Street Uniting Church. He also designed many of Brisbane's premier houses including Cumbooquepa at South Brisbane; Halwyn at Red Hill; Kirkston at Windsor; Fernbrook at Indooroopilly and Ralahyne at Clayfield.

George Layou's book about the history of Maryborough provides a long description of Oonooraba:

The place is named Oonooraba, so called because the ground was once the fighting place of the blacks. Four and a half years ago the house was built of fine pine and beech and the quality of the timber was of the best. The plot comprises six acres and it was on the spot where the house now stands that the first humpy was seen thirty five years ago. It commands a fine view of the Ulalah Reserve, a chain of fine waterholes where the old fowls love to dwell. Before the house is a fine circular lawn, two and a half chains in diameter, with a carriage drive around it. On either side of the lawn are ten beautiful Araucarias (Cookii). These forming the inner boundary of the drive around it, with Eugenia macrocarpa and Araucaria excelsa as the outer one make a pleasing and rich front. Mr Stafford has proved beyond question that the Japanese national flower, the chrysanthemum, is not alone suited to the cooler climates of the south as the .. chrysanthemum show in Brisbane he secured the champion prize for size and quality against all comers...One inestimable advantage of the situation is its opened. A fair view of the town is seen from the front, with the hospital buildings away on the south, while on the other side is a panorama of the river, dale and hill.

James Stafford died on 4 April 1900 and the land was acquired by the Queensland Trustees. This did not comprise the entire block as his wife officially owned half of the land which she retained until her death in the 1930s. After her death the ownership of the property changed several times and, despite further subdivisions, has been retained as a private residence although with a much-reduced garden.

== Description ==
Oonooraba is sited on Pallas Street, facing, not south east toward that street but to the north east toward Ann Street, from where access was originally provided to the property. The site comprises the building, a substantial elevated one-storeyed timber house, which is surrounded by a large garden with established trees including two Araucaria Cookii and several palm trees.

The building is timber framed and is supported on squared timber columns which elevate the home about 3 metres (9.8 ft) from ground level. Access is provided to the principal floor of the house via a wide straight concrete stair emerging from the principal, north eastern facade. The stair is flanked by concrete balustrade which terminates at the base with newels on which sit lion statues. Filling the cavity between the timber posts supporting the house is diagonal timber lattice panels. The house is clad with wide horizontal timber boards which are quite unusual with heavily beaded mouldings at the tongue and groove joints.

The house is essentially rectangular in plan with a kitchen wing adjoining the rear elevation on the south west side of the building. Wide verandahs line three sides of the building and on the principal facade where the two corners of the face of the building are punctuated with bay windows, this is reflected in the projecting line of the verandah. The hipped roof of Oonooraba also reflects these bays with the addition of small hipped partial pyramidal roof forms over the bays.

The bull nosed verandah awning of Oonooraba is supported on turned columns with curved brackets, paired toward the principal entrance of the house. Above the columns are frieze panels, comprising diagonal latticework flanking a central section of vertical battening. The verandah balustrades which are replacements of a cast iron balustrade are of vertical timber battening with decorative cutouts in regularly spaced battens. Many early lattice screens and timber louvres survive in the verandah openings.

The principal entrance of Oonooraba is from the south east, where the steps provide access to the verandah, from which a large central doorway provides access to the house. The doorway comprises a substantial five panelled and moulded timber door, flanked by sidelights with leadlight glazing above moulded base panels. These are surrounded by a substantial architrave and the door is surmounted by a narrow operable fanlight. The doorway is surmounted by a centrally placed timber entablature which terminates in a broken pediment. Other openings to the house, flanking the entrance and from all internal rooms with access to the verandah, are full length vertical sash walk-through openings surrounded by moulded architraves.

The entrance door gives access to a small entrance vestibule, which in turn provides access to a central hall from which the principal rooms of the house are accessed. The entrance vestibule has timber dado panelling, which comprises a skirting, an alternating timber boarded body and a wide dado rail. This pattern of dado panelling continues to other rooms of the house, with changes in other rooms of the amount of moulding and height of the skirting and dado rail and also the alternating timber boards, which here are two different types of timber, and with the lighter coloured timber reeded. Above the dado panelling in the entrance vestibule is early floral wall paper, divided into panels with vertical and horizontal border strips. Dividing this room from the central hall is a timber screen of half glazed double timber swing doors, flanked by similarly detailed half glazed sidelights and surmounted by transom lights. The glazing in the doorway is leadlight with a simple geometric pattern rendered in coloured and arctic glass.

The central hall is lined with unpainted vertical timber boards, above a dado panel similar to that found in the vestibule. Above a cornice around the timber boarding is a curved timber ceiling centrally placed in which is a lay light, or horizontal glazed panelling below a roof lantern, from which pendant lighting is hung. The rectangular lay light comprises three leadlight panels glazed with strongly coloured small sections of glass within regular borders surrounding three ceiling roses. Within the hall four doorways, with four panelled doors and operable transoms above lead to rooms on either side, and a round arched doorway in the far, south western wall, leads to the rear rooms of the house. Some early door furniture surviving in this section is of black enamel with handpainted scenes of foliage and birds in gold lacquer.

To the north west of the entrance hall are two large, public rooms, connected to one another by a squared arched opening in their shared partition. Both rooms are lined with a similar dado panelling to that mentioned previously, although in the room closer to the front of the building, the lighter timber in the body of the panelling is fluted, rather than reeded, and in the rear room, the lighter timber is smooth-faced. Both rooms are lined with early printed wallpaper, of a hazy pattern of blotches of white and umber on a light warm grey base. The wallpaper is matched with a cut out floral frieze around the walls above the dado rail, and a larger frieze, below the cornice, comprising a wider cutout floral strip with regularly spaced large stylised scenes. The ceilings in these rooms are timber boarded with coffering and featuring several large ceiling roses, some with early colour schemes. Early door furniture survives in these rooms and is similar to that in the central hall but of white enamel rather than of black. A dark stained timber fireplace is in a truncated corner of the rear of the two rooms, and this is lines with ceramic tiles.

From this rear room access is provided via a four panelled sliding timber doorway into a large rear hall also able to be accessed from the arched doorway in the central hall. Another dark stained timber fireplace sits in a corresponding truncated corner. This room is lined to about 2500 high with vertical timber boarding, comprising dado panelling of only one type of timber but similar in other respects to that found elsewhere. From this room access is provided to a rear verandah from where the kitchen, and adjacent semi-open room on the verandah and storage rooms are found.

On the other side of the central hall are the more private rooms of the house, and these are generally timber lined with vertical timber boarding, occasionally with string coursing at picture rail height and simple cornice and skirting. These rooms have interconnecting doors near the external walls. In a section of infilled verandah is an early (c. 1920s) bathroom.

== Heritage listing ==
Oonooraba was listed on the Queensland Heritage Register on 21 October 1992 having satisfied the following criteria.

The place is important in demonstrating the evolution or pattern of Queensland's history.

Oonooraba demonstrates the growth of Maryborough during the late nineteenth century when a number of large residences were constructed, reflecting the growing infrastructure.

The place demonstrates rare, uncommon or endangered aspects of Queensland's cultural heritage.

The building is a rare surviving and substantially intact residence designed by prominent Brisbane, GHM Addison, with whom it has special associations.

The place has potential to yield information that will contribute to an understanding of Queensland's history.

The house was supposedly built on a site where Aboriginal clans met, therefore the site has the potential to yield important information about early indigenous lifestyles in and around Maryborough.

The place is important in demonstrating the principal characteristics of a particular class of cultural places.

The building is characteristic of a large timber residence of the late nineteenth century, and is characteristic of the fine design skill of architect GHM Addison. The building has considerable architectural merit as a well composed and innovative residence.

The place is important because of its aesthetic significance.

Many of the features of the building are of considerable aesthetic value including the joinery, particularly the entrance door, unpainted internally dado panelling which varies throughout; early wallpaper complete with friezes and borders; other internal joinery and glazing; door furniture and fireplaces.

The place has a special association with the life or work of a particular person, group or organisation of importance in Queensland's history.

The building is associated with prominent local citizen, James Stafford and with the fine architect, George Henry Male Addison.
