= The Mansions, Brisbane =

Heritage-listed buildings in Brisbane, Queensland

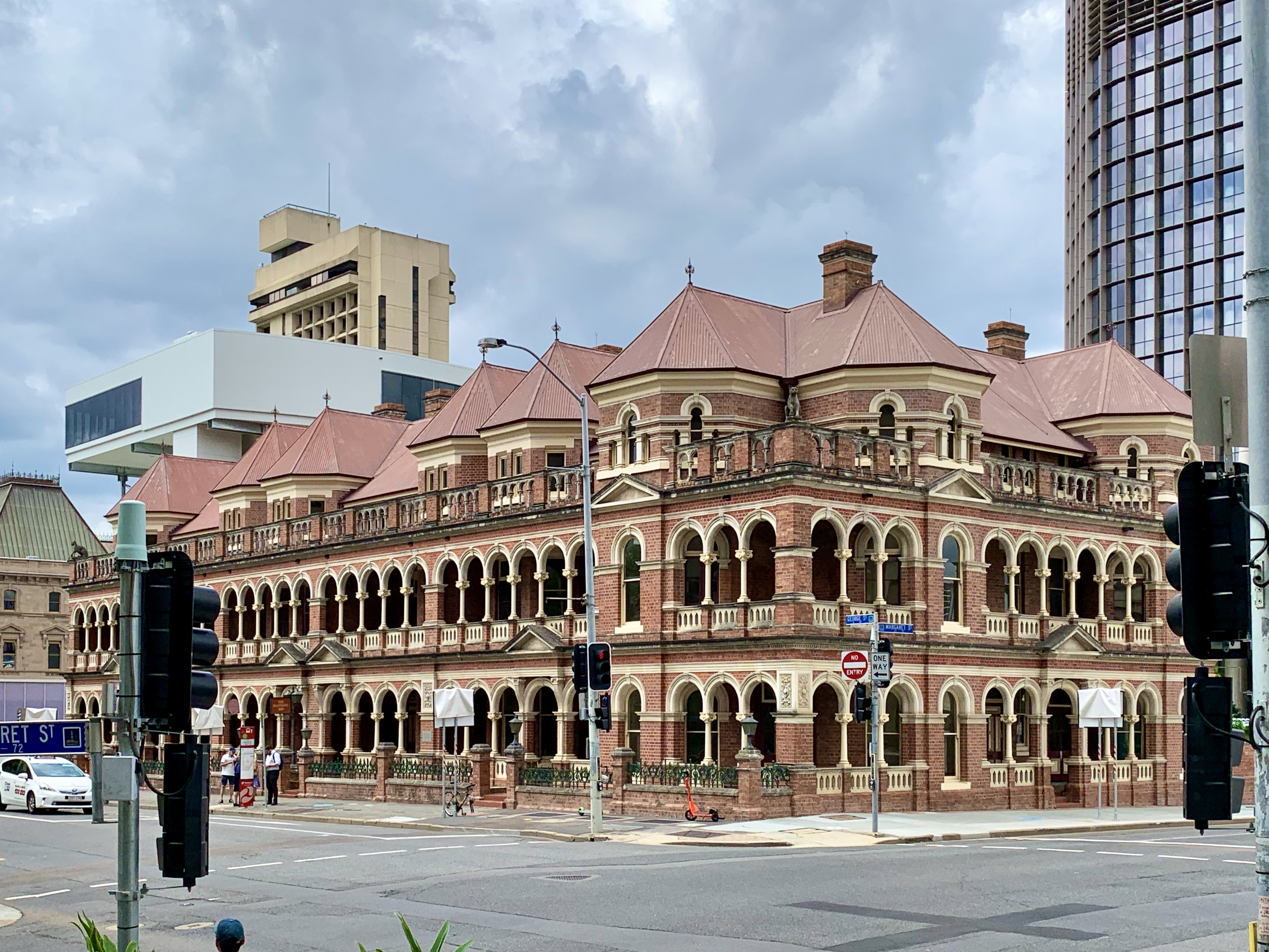
- George Street corner Margaret Street façade of the Mansions.

- Location within Queensland
- 27.4744°S 153.0266°E
- Location: 40 George Street, Brisbane City, City of Brisbane, Queensland, Australia

History
- Design period: 1870s–1890s (late 19th century)
- Built: 1889

Site notes
- Architect: G.H.M. Addison
- Architectural style: Victorian architecture

Queensland Heritage Register
- Official name: The Mansions
- Type: state heritage (built)
- Designated: 21 August 1992
- Reference no.: 600119
- Significant period: 1880s onwards
- Significant components: residential accommodation – terrace house/terrace, fence/wall – perimeter
- Builders: RE Burton

The Mansions is a heritage-listed row of six terrace houses at 40 George Street (corner of Margaret Street), Brisbane City, City of Brisbane, Queensland, Australia. It was designed by G.H.M. Addison and built in 1889 by RE Burton. It was added to the Queensland Heritage Register on 21 August 1992.

The architectural style is Victorian with Italianate influences.

== History ==
The Mansions, built in 1889 and located near Parliament House on the George Street ridge at the corner of Margaret Street, was designed by architect George Henry Male Addison as six attached elite masonry houses. Constructed by RE Burton for £11,700, it was an investment for three Queensland politicians – Boyd Dunlop Morehead, then Premier; William Pattison, Treasurer; and John Stevenson, member for Clermont – during a decade of enormous population growth and land development in Brisbane.

Since the 1820s, the north bank and adjacent ridgeline of the Brisbane River, now containing William and George Streets, has always featured a concentration of government and associated activities and uses. Over the period of the Moreton Bay penal settlement, buildings constructed along this ridgeline, were used by government officials for "accommodation, administration and control". When the settlement was closed in 1842, the remnant penal infrastructure was used by surveyors as a basis for the layout for the new town of Brisbane. Set at right angles to the river, the prisoner's barracks determined Queen Street, while the line of buildings along the ridge determined William Street. Streets surveyed parallel to these streets including George Street, formed Brisbane's rectangular grid.

While a range of buildings and activities occurred along George and William Streets from the 1840s, the government maintained its dominant presence in the area. At some sites (such as the former Commissariat Store and Brisbane Botanic Gardens) earlier uses were continued. The establishment phase following the separation of Queensland in 1859 saw the new colonial government reserve land parcels and construct a range of buildings to facilitate its functions. The building of Government House (now Old Government House) and Parliament House along the eastern end of the George Street alignment in the 1860s firmly entrenched the physical reality of a government precinct in the area.

The siting of Parliament House had a pronounced effect on the built environment around lower George Street. Many of Queensland's early politicians were pastoralists, a reflection of their economic dominance in the colony. Together with a growing workforce of public servants, these politicians required accommodation when in Brisbane. From the 1860s to the 1880s, a range of buildings, many built by, or for politicians, were built to address these needs.

Throughout the 1880s Brisbane was transforming into a colonial city. Many of Queensland's immigrants remained in the capital, swelling the population from almost 40,000 in 1881 to well over 90,000 in 1891. This growth stimulated building, municipal organisation, amenities and services, and cultural and leisure outlets. The flourishing building activity caused Brisbane's practising architects to treble in number, and builders and contractors to rise from 16 in 1882 to 87 in 1887. Brisbane's centre sprouted a host of impressive new stone buildings including the Customs House, additions to the Government Printing Office, the first wing of the Treasury Building and the Alice Street facade of Parliament House. The number of inhabited dwellings in the capital almost doubled between 1881 and 1891 from 5,814 to 10,321, causing the town to overshoot its old boundaries. Consequently, land speculation was extensive and the capital value of metropolitan land rose towards its peak in 1890, a level not approximated again until 1925.

The land on which The Mansions was later erected, lots 1 and 2 of Portion 38, was originally purchased as Town Lot 56 in 1852 by land speculator James Gibbon. By 1863 he had subdivided the land into three lots, but lots 1 and 2 remained vacant. The land was transferred in 1882 to William Williams, a successful Brisbane businessman associated with the Australian Steam Navigation Shipping Company. He in turn sold the vacant land in August 1888 to Pattison, Morehead and Stevenson who were members of parliament, business associates and friends.

BD Morehead (1843–1905) was a pastoralist, businessman and politician who served in both the Queensland Legislative Assembly and Legislative Council. With AB Buchanan he established BD Morehead and Co. in 1873 which comprised a mercantile and trading business and a stock and station agency. He experienced financial disaster in the 1893 economic crisis. William Pattison (1830–96), a businessman, mine director and politician, served in the Queensland Legislative Assembly between 1886 and 1893. He was one of the original shareholders and later chairman of directors of the Mount Morgan Gold Mining Company but was damaged politically and economically by the 50% collapse of the company's share price from mid-1888. John Stevenson was a pastoralist who bought into the firm of BD Morehead and Co., managing the stock and station business until 1896 when he formed the business J Stevenson and Co. He was a member of the Queensland Legislative Assembly from 1875 to 1893.

These three men engaged architect George Henry Male Addison to design a row of houses for the George Street site. Addison had moved from Melbourne to Brisbane and established a branch of Oakden, Addison and Kemp, which in 1888 won the competition to build a new exhibition hall for the National Agricultural and Industrial Association on Gregory Terrace (now known as the Old Museum Building). Addison was an accomplished designer, his buildings stylistically eclectic and more ornately and highly finished than any previously seen in the city. The distinctive use of face brickwork relieved with stone or rendered detailing and steep dominant roof forms are characteristics of his work. Other Addison-designed buildings include the Albert Street Uniting Church in Brisbane and the Strand Theatre in Toowoomba Addison's skills and distinctive style of domestic architecture were recognised and attracted business from Queensland's leading professionals. Noteworthy houses designed by him are Cliveden Mansions in Brisbane; Kirkston in Brisbane; Oonooraba in Maryborough, and Ralahyne, and Cumbooquepa both in South Brisbane. Addison called tenders for the construction of The Mansions viz "city residences in George street" in the Brisbane Courier on 29 September 1888, closing on 15 October. RE Burton's tender of £11,600 was accepted.

The Mansions was designed to be impressive and aesthetically pleasing, using high quality materials, generous use of ornamentation and careful composition of building forms, the six individual houses being unified by the overriding use of arcades and the arrangement, in alternating pairs, of entries and roof dormers. The design was well suited to the climate, the arcades providing shade without impeding ventilation. Soon after the residences were completed in late 1889 The Boomerang described them as:

"unique in their way, being built after the Queen Anne style of red brick with stone facing. They have been constructed to suit the climate. The mantelpieces are very rich and were specially imported. In fact, its as fine a terrace as any in Australia".

Addison published a drawing of The Mansions in 1890 in the Building and Engineering Journal of Australia, describing them as:

"convenient and roomy having three reception rooms and ten bedrooms, exclusive of servants" quarters. The front is of brick, relieved with Oomaroo [sic] stone, the total cost £11,700...".

The Mansions as terraced houses were a type of land use that was uncommon in colonial Queensland due to the enactment of the Undue Subdivision of Land Prevention Act 1885. This legislation enforced a minimum lot size of 16 perches (400 m^{2}) and a minimum frontage of 30 feet (9.1 m) effectively stopping the building of terraced housing in Queensland except as a rental investment. Early pre-legislation versions of terraced housing in Brisbane included Harris Terrace and Hodgson's Terrace (demolished) in George Street; Athol Place in Spring Hill (1860s); Princess Row in Petrie Terrace (1863) and a group of four houses (c. 1884-1885) in Wellington Road, Petrie Terrace. Terraces built around 1885 or afterwards included Byrne Terrace on Wickham Terrace (1885–86, architects John Hall and Son, demolished); O'Keefe Terrace on Petrie Terrace (1886–87, architect Andrea Stombuco and Son); Cook Terrace (1889, possibly Taylor and Richer) on Coronation Drive; Cross Terrace in Red Hill (1886); Petrie Mansions on Petrie Terrace (1887–88); Brighton Terrace in West End (1890 John Beauchamp Nicholson); and two terrace houses on Wellington Street, Petrie Terrace (1894/95). Of these, The Mansions was the grandest and most ambitious architecturally.

Elite tenants began to occupy the well-located residences from 1889 but the economic downturn which culminated in the 1893 depression denied full occupancy. Although the Queensland economy experienced problems from the mid-1880s, the downturn only became apparent from 1889 after local confidence waned and British investment funds dried up. The building industry was affected first and most severely, then depression spread to other sectors of the economy. The severest years of the depression in Queensland were from 1891 to 1893. Brisbane's economic experiences followed those of the Queensland economy overall but with different emphases. The phenomenal growth of the 1880s had culminated in widespread speculation in land and buildings, which created an excess capacity of offices and dwellings. Brisbane's descent into depression began with a crash in the construction and building materials industries and the collapse of building societies towards the end of 1891 after the climax of its land and building boom. Land and rent values began dropping in 1890, reaching their lowest level in 1893–1894. Empty dwellings became a common sight in the city and suburbs - some deserted while other recently built ones had never been occupied. All three investors in The Mansions suffered severe financial losses during this depression.

By 30 November 1889, two of the villas were occupied by members of parliament, William Pattison and the Hon. Hume Black. Advertisements in the Brisbane Courier for tenants to let both the "George Street Mansions and Harris Terrace" on the opposite corner of Margaret Street appeared in the Brisbane Courier during December 1889. Other early residents were doctors – in 1890 Dr Fourness Simmons and a Dr Bennett. The 1891 Post Office Directory listed four houses as unoccupied and two occupied by doctors, EM Owens and A Bennett. In December 1891, Dr Lilian Cooper, Queensland's first woman doctor and Australia's first female surgeon, established her consulting rooms in The Mansions and resided there for several years after the 1893 floods. Pattison moved from The Mansions in July 1891 and a Mrs Prince, previously of Glencairn, Wickham Terrace advertised that she had leased:

"the Hon. W Pattison's late residence, The Mansion, George Street' and would be "pleased to receive applications for Accommodation. The buildings are situated close to Parliament House and are therefore highly suited to members".

In 1892 The Mansions housed a Mrs Probyn who resided in "The Grange" (possibly a boarding house) and which was replaced the following year by Elizabeth Bird's boarding house.

Between 1896 and 1954 The Mansions was used primarily as boarding houses, which operated under various names. Guests included professional families such as barrister and later University of Queensland Registrar Frank Cumbrae-Stewart and family from 1906, the Commissioner of Public Health John Simeon Colebrook Elkington and wife in 1912, District Court Judge Allan Wight McNaughton and electrical engineer William Muir Nelson. Some doctors such as Arthur Benjamin Carvosso continued to practice from The Mansions.

Despite ownership of The Mansions changing a number of times, this did not result in changes of use. The property was transferred to the Queensland National Bank in August 1898 and was sold in 1912 to Gerard Ralph Gore and Christiana Gore, pastoralists on the Darling Downs, in order to recoup the loan for its construction. In 1925 the property was sold again but due to the owner's death quickly transferred to the Queensland Trustees. In 1947 the property was sold to three new owners, two of whom ran three boarding houses using the property's six villas. The boarding houses (from the Alice Street end) were named Lonsdale (24–26 George Street), Glenmore (28–30) and Binna Burra (32–44).

In 1954 The Mansions was offered at public auction, but passed in when the reserve was not reached.

Subsequently, the Queensland Government purchased the property for use as government offices as part of its acquisition of buildings in George Street under what was then officially known as the "George Street Plan". A shortage of accommodation for administrative offices in State-owned buildings had been identified immediately after World War II when the Queensland Government began to expand their activities considerably in Brisbane city. Most public servants were then located in the Treasury and Executive Buildings in George Street and in offices in Anzac Square. The shortage of office accommodation in the Brisbane central business district, and the need to address future requirements, led to a phase of governmental property acquisition in the city. The purchase of properties on George and William Streets between the Government Printing Office and Parliament House was a key focus, in addition to other acquisitions on Charlotte, Mary and Margaret Streets. Properties in William Street were purchased in 1946–1947 and the expenditure in 1954 on properties for this purpose in George, William and Margaret Streets, including The Mansions, was £60,500. Despite their varying condition and former uses, many of these newly acquired buildings were quickly adapted for government use.

At this time the Department of Public Works prepared measured drawings of The Mansions. "Lonsdale" and "Glenmore" were described as:

"a three storey double brick building...conducted as a residential and compris[ing] 32 rooms, 16 of which are let as flatettes and 16 as serviced rooms".

Linings and ceilings were plaster except at the top floor where ceilings were beaded pine. Floors were mainly pine. There were 10 fireplaces of which two were marble and the remainder "ornamental timber". There was one "set of 4 foot [1.2m] wide twin cedar staircases in excellent condition". Four bathrooms, two shower rooms, two laundries and six sewerage units served the property. The condition of the properties was considered to be fair. At the rear of the land, there were two double storey brick dormitories and a garage, which were of much inferior construction and finish to the main building.

Conversion of The Mansions into government offices cost £45,054. Drawings prepared for the conversion show that the general configuration of the houses was changed. Walls were removed, new doorways made, fireplaces blocked, internal partitions installed, concrete floors for toilets added and all stairs except one at the rear of no. 28–30 were removed or altered. Original details including dado panelling in the halls and dining rooms, and leadlight sidelights on the front doors were removed. Evidence of the original asymmetrical arrangement of bay windows at ground floor level was lost except in no. 24–26 and new load-bearing partitions were installed on the first and second floor levels above the dining rooms.

A range of government departments occupied The Mansions until the 1970s. The Government Statistician's Office was located on the ground floor from c. 1956 and by 1961 the Medical boards, Licensing Commission, Prices Branch, Department of Public Works and Probation Office occupied the first floor. Replanning of the Medical boards' offices took place in 1967 and remodelling of the ground floor for the Comptroller-General of Prisons occurred in 1972.

The consolidation of government ownership and usage along George and William streets led to a number of schemes in being investigated by the state to further the development of a "government precinct". By 1965, a masterplan had been developed involving the demolition of all buildings between the Executive Building (Land Administration Building) and Parliament House, to enable the construction of three high-rise office buildings in a "plaza setting". In November 1965 the government announced the proposed demolition of its George Street office buildings. A new Executive Building was completed in 1971 as part of this plan (scheduled for demolition in 2017 as part of the Queen's Wharf Redevelopment). However, by the early 1970s this plan for the precinct was considered no longer suitable and a number of other proposals for the area were explored.

A 1974 "George Street Masterplan" involved lower rise buildings spread out over greater areas and the demolition of the Bellevue Hotel and The Mansions. A major influence in ultimately shaping the layout of the area during the 1970s was the growing community support for the retention of older buildings within the government precinct. In 1973 the National Trust of Queensland began a public campaign to save both The Mansions and its next-door neighbour in George Street, the Bellevue Hotel, from demolition under the Queensland Government's "George Street Masterplan". The campaign highlighted the government-related associations and links between buildings, their architectural qualities, and aesthetic contributions to the area in submissions to the government and in the public sphere. In 1973, a green ban was imposed on The Mansions by the Builders Labourers Federation to stop its destruction to make an office block, along with green bans on Queensland Club and Bellevue Hotel. The unannounced June 1974 removal of the balconies of the Bellevue Hotel was a deliberate action by the Queensland Government to degrade the visual appearance of the area, and drew further attention to the conservation cause.

Ultimately the Bellevue Hotel was demolished in April 1979 after Cabinet adopted a recommended schedule of demolition work to further the development of the government precinct. The Bellevue Hotel was to be demolished, but The Mansions and the original section of Harris Terrace were to be retained, renovated and adapted. On 21 April, three days after this decision, the Bellevue Hotel was demolished in the early hours of the morning, a notorious event in the history of heritage conservation in Queensland causing a furore of public complaint.

The Mansions servants' wings and stables were demolished later in 1979 in accordance with the Cabinet decision. However, this did not cause a complete loss of the area to the rear of The Mansions, which may still reveal archaeological information about foundations and material culture related to servants' occupation of this area of the site.

Subsequently, several schemes were prepared for the reconstruction and conservation of The Mansions. Measured drawings of the remaining sections of the building were prepared and exteriors photographed. Plans for the renovations and alterations were prepared by Lund Hutton Ryan Architects in 1980 and in 1982 further plans for the restoration were prepared by Conrad and Gargett in association with the Department of Public Works. At this time it was reported that there were problems with rising damp; the existing roof framing was generally sound; none of the original staircases survived; all internal walls were plastered brick or plaster and lathe on timber framing; the few original ceilings on the ground and first floors were plaster and lathe while on the second floor they were tongue and groove pine; some original skirtings, architraves, cornices and ceiling roses remained; some original fire surrounds and grates survived; many original doors and windows survived but were in disrepair; and hardware had been changed.

A final renovation scheme was prepared then carried out in 1983–1984. This development removed most of the 1950s fit-out as well as removing original material, reconstructing features and adding new features such as a lift and air conditioning plant. A transverse corridor was created by enclosing parts of the rear courtyards in glass requiring reconfiguration of the rear verandahs. Stairs and toilets were installed in the second reception room at the ground floor level. Walls which formed the small front room at the first floor level were removed. All the ceilings and the remaining evidence of the original off centre bay layout of no. 24–26 at ground floor level and the surviving dining room fireplace in no. 40 were removed. Castings of ceiling roses were installed throughout the rooms. Most of the wall plaster was removed. Most door and window joinery was reconstructed. New stairs were constructed using detail and parts from the original but in a new configuration. The roof sheeting was replaced, new finials constructed and the rear verandahs rebuilt. New dormer windows at roof level were constructed facing south-west over the new rear verandahs. Most of the ground floor and second floor ceiling framing and some of the roof framing was replaced. All floors were re-laid with plywood and hearths removed, concrete slabs were laid in wet areas, tie downs were installed and new ceramic tile paving was laid on verandah floors.

On 28 April 1986 Premier Joh Bjelke-Petersen officially opened the Government Precinct Development incorporating the State Works Centre, the renovated Harris Terrace and The Mansions. After the redevelopment, The Mansions housed a variety of professional offices and exclusive specialist retail stores. A restaurant also operated in the building.

Since this refurbishment only minor alterations have occurred to the buildings, apart from updating of services and the provision of disability access. A freestanding roof was constructed next to the south-east rear verandah of the house at the Alice Street end for the restaurant tenant in 1988.

In 1990 there was a proposal to sell The Mansions with the Port Office and Smellies building but this did not proceed.

In 2002, the Mansions was featured in a television advertisement for the Australian Quarantine and Inspection Service, which starred Steve Irwin.

In 2005 timber decking and ramps were added in Queen's Place for access at the Alice Street end.

In 2015, it was announced that The Mansions would be restored and used as an up-market tea house, dining and bar, and serviced apartments as part of the Queen's Wharf Redevelopment.

== Description ==
The Mansions is a three-storeyed brick and stone terrace on the corner of Margaret and George Street, Brisbane. The building stands in an urban context, on a high ridge of land, with open landscaped space behind and beside it. The precinct is dominated by mid-to-late nineteenth and early twentieth century state government-related buildings including the nearby Parliament House, Queensland Club, Harris Terrace, the former Government Printing Office, former Land Administration Building, and the former Treasury Building. It makes a strong contribution to the George and Margaret Streets streetscapes as a prominent, decorative and striking form.

The Mansions is a face brick structure with limestone dressings and a painted corrugated steel roof. It sits back slightly from the George Street alignment behind a brick pier fence with wrought iron panels. However, it is built to the Margaret Street alignment. The building is visibly separated into six houses unified by the facade - a deep arcade of arches on the ground and first floors along both street fronts. The second floor is partially incorporated within the roof space behind a decorative parapet. Each house has an octagonal bay projecting onto the arcade on both levels that is carried through onto the roof as a multi-faced hip perpendicular to the main roof. Although fully cohesive, the design is perceptibly five houses facing George Street that are mirrors of each other in plan with a sixth house, on the corner, primarily facing Margaret Street that is of an individual layout and superior scale. The sixth house has two octagonal bays and they are larger and project fully to the street alignment. The entrance to the sixth house is from Margaret Street.

The building is designed in a Victorian style with Italianate influences. The arcade is decoratively treated. Short cast iron colonettes (thin columns) have Ionic order capitals incorporating garland swags, carved limestone panels, and entrances accentuated by triangular pediments. Two sculpted limestone cats sit atop the parapet of the George Street facade. The white details and cat sculptures were rendered in Oamaru limestone imported from New Zealand.

Wings with timber verandahs on their ground and first floors extend off the rear and are separated by courtyards. Rear walls feature cement render indicating the profile of demolished service wings.

The interior of the building is considerably altered. Room layouts indicate original separate tenancies but openings in the party walls now connect them. Fittings, though ornate, are reproductions and suspended ceilings conceal air-conditioning ducts. A lift and other modern facilities are also installed.

== Heritage listing ==
The Mansions was listed on the Queensland Heritage Register on 21 August 1992 having satisfied the following criteria.

The place is important in demonstrating the evolution or pattern of Queensland's history.

The Mansions (1889) is important in demonstrating the evolution of urban development in colonial Queensland as a result of the 1880s land boom, especially in the capital city Brisbane.

It demonstrates the pattern of development of the Brisbane CBD with lower George Street as a prestigious residential area associated with parliament and the site of professional offices from the 1860s. The Mansions is a distinctive example of this residential development of lower George Street.

It also demonstrates, through its purchase and refit for government offices, the development of lower George Street as a government office precinct post World War II.

The survival of The Mansions, despite 1960s plans for its demolition, demonstrates how increased public concern about the preservation of heritage buildings influenced government redevelopment plans during the 1970s and 1980s.

The place demonstrates rare, uncommon or endangered aspects of Queensland's cultural heritage.

The Mansions demonstrates nineteenth century terraced housing - a form of housing, which was uncommon and is now rare in Queensland. The building is a distinctive and exceptional example of prestigious, late nineteenth century terraced housing.

The place has potential to yield information that will contribute to an understanding of Queensland's history.

The Mansions has potential to contribute to a greater understanding of Queensland's history. Potential exists at the rear of The Mansions for archaeological materials including footings and foundations associated with the former servants' and kitchen wings, and objects and refuse commonly found within domestic contexts, particularly ceramic, glass and personal items.

The place is important in demonstrating the principal characteristics of a particular class of cultural places.

The Mansions is important in demonstrating the principal characteristics of late nineteenth century, terraced housing. Defining elements of this style of housing include its shared dividing walls, repetition of form and linear house plan. Comprising six residences, the building is a fine and rare Queensland example of prestigious, late nineteenth century terrace housing and exemplifies the urban lifestyle experienced by affluent Queenslanders of this period.

The Mansions are also an example of the work of George Henry Male Addison, a designer who made an important contribution to Queensland's built environment. Stylistically, these ornate terrace houses are unlike any others in Queensland, characteristics of Addison's work as a designer achieving maximum effect with roof form and face brickwork relieved with stone detailing.

The place is important because of its aesthetic significance.

The Mansions is important for its architectural attributes. The skilful and complex composition of face brickwork, stone detailing, shady arcaded verandahs, integrated gardens and fencing, and complex roof form are of aesthetic beauty and make a strong contribution to the George and Margaret Streets streetscape and to the government precinct in George and William Streets.

The place has a strong or special association with a particular community or cultural group for social, cultural or spiritual reasons.

The Mansions has a strong association for its cultural heritage significance with Queenslanders concerned about heritage issues. It was the focus of the National Trust of Queensland's campaign to save the Belle Vue Hotel and The Mansions during the 1970s, which had wide public support and resulted in The Mansions not being demolished. Newspaper, film, magazine and journal articles from the period demonstrate this association.

== Gallery ==
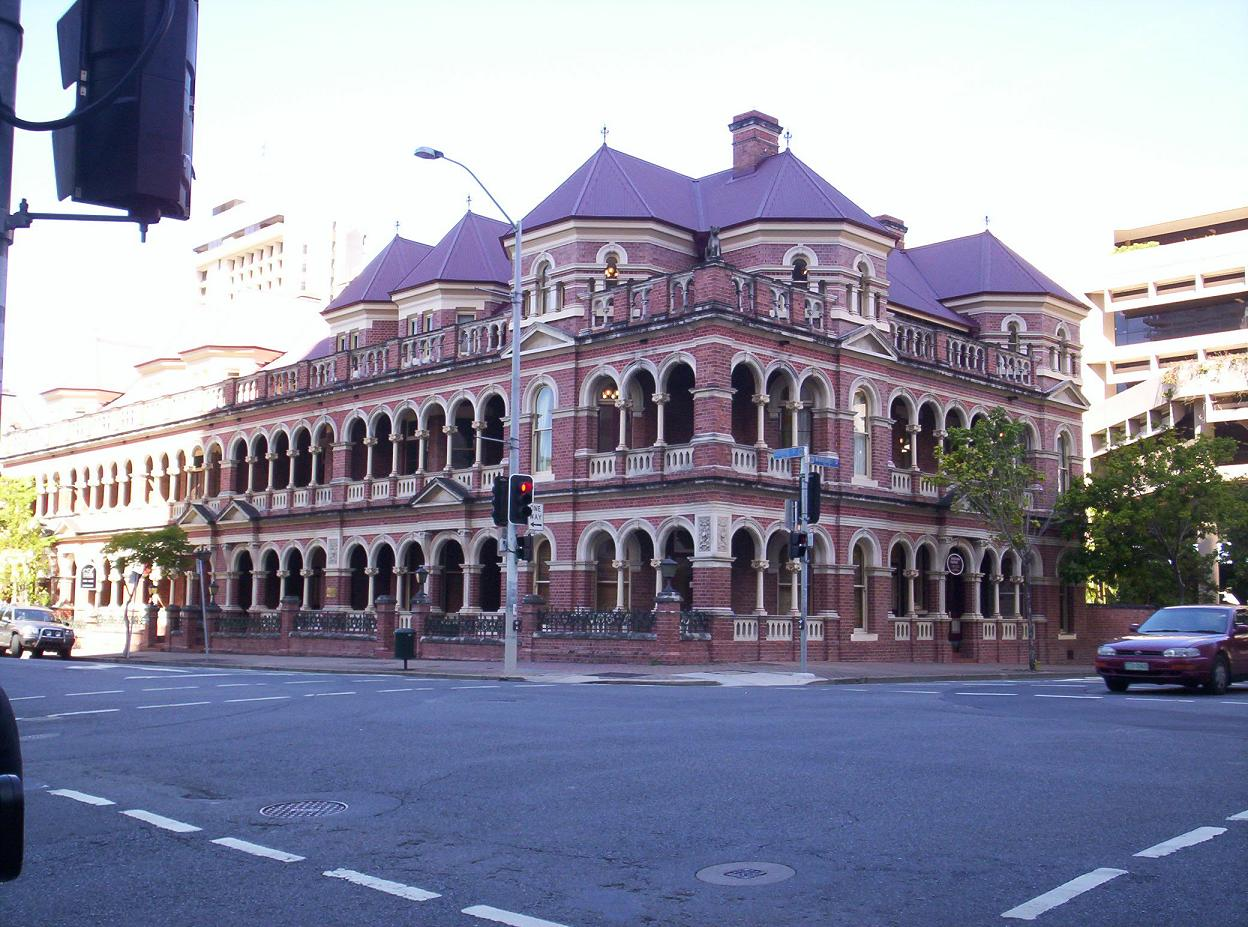
The Mansions — George Street façade

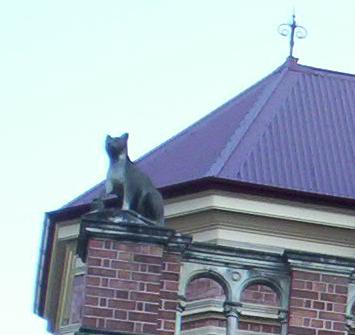
Cat sculpture on the parapet of the Mansions — Margaret Street façade

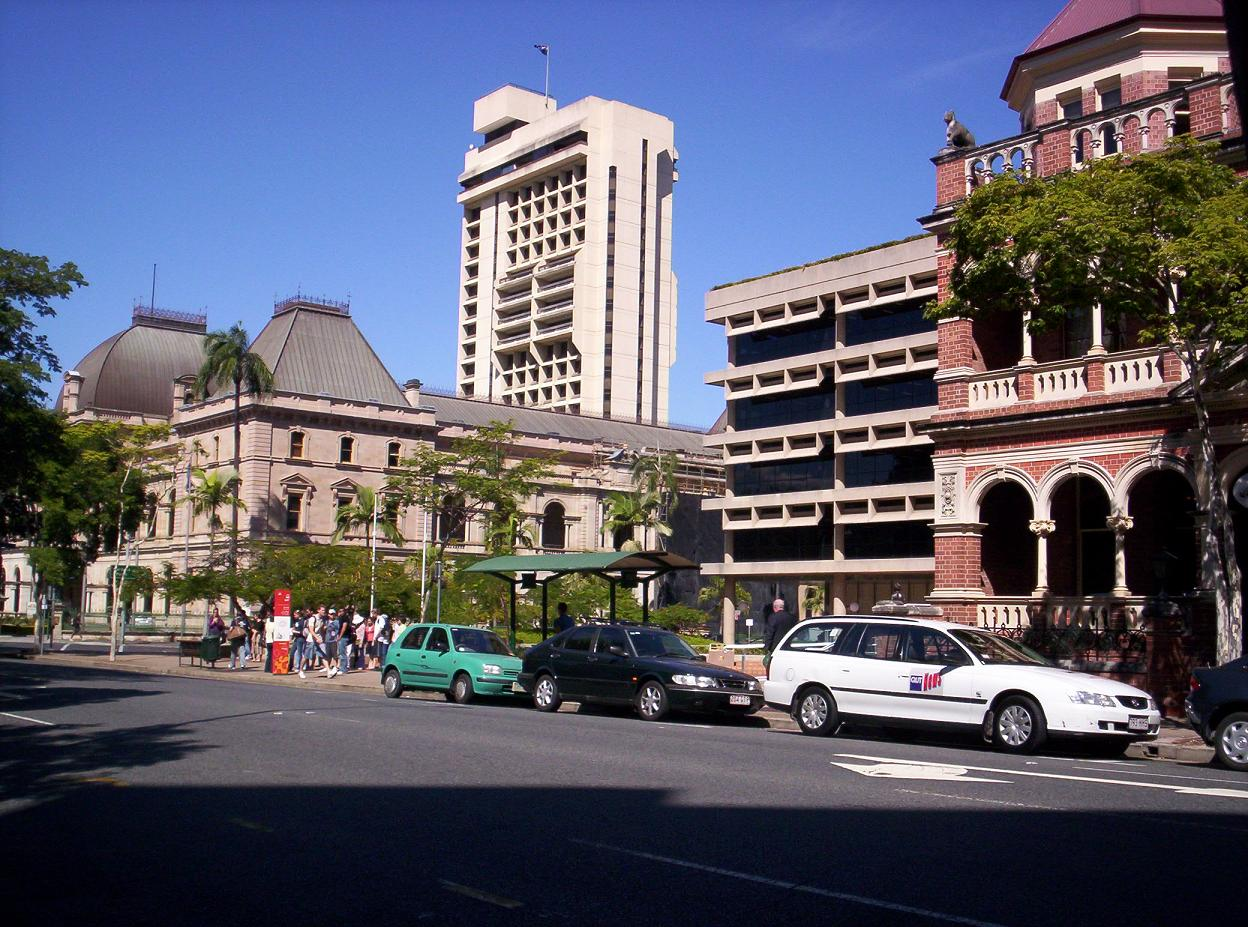
The Mansions and Parliament House

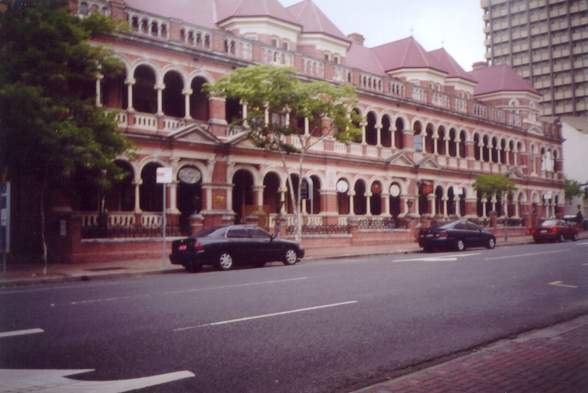
The Mansions — George Street façade

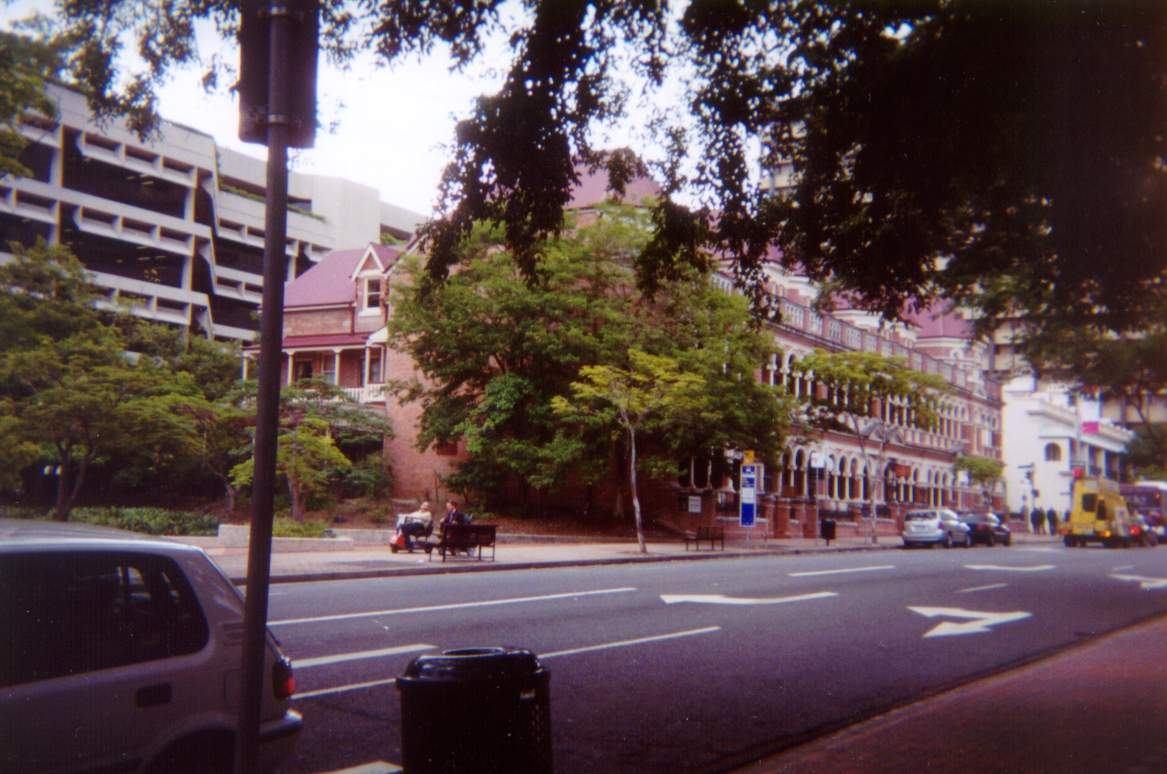
The Mansions (as viewed from Alice Street) — George Street façade
