= Queensland Club =

Heritage listed building in Brisbane, Queensland, Australia

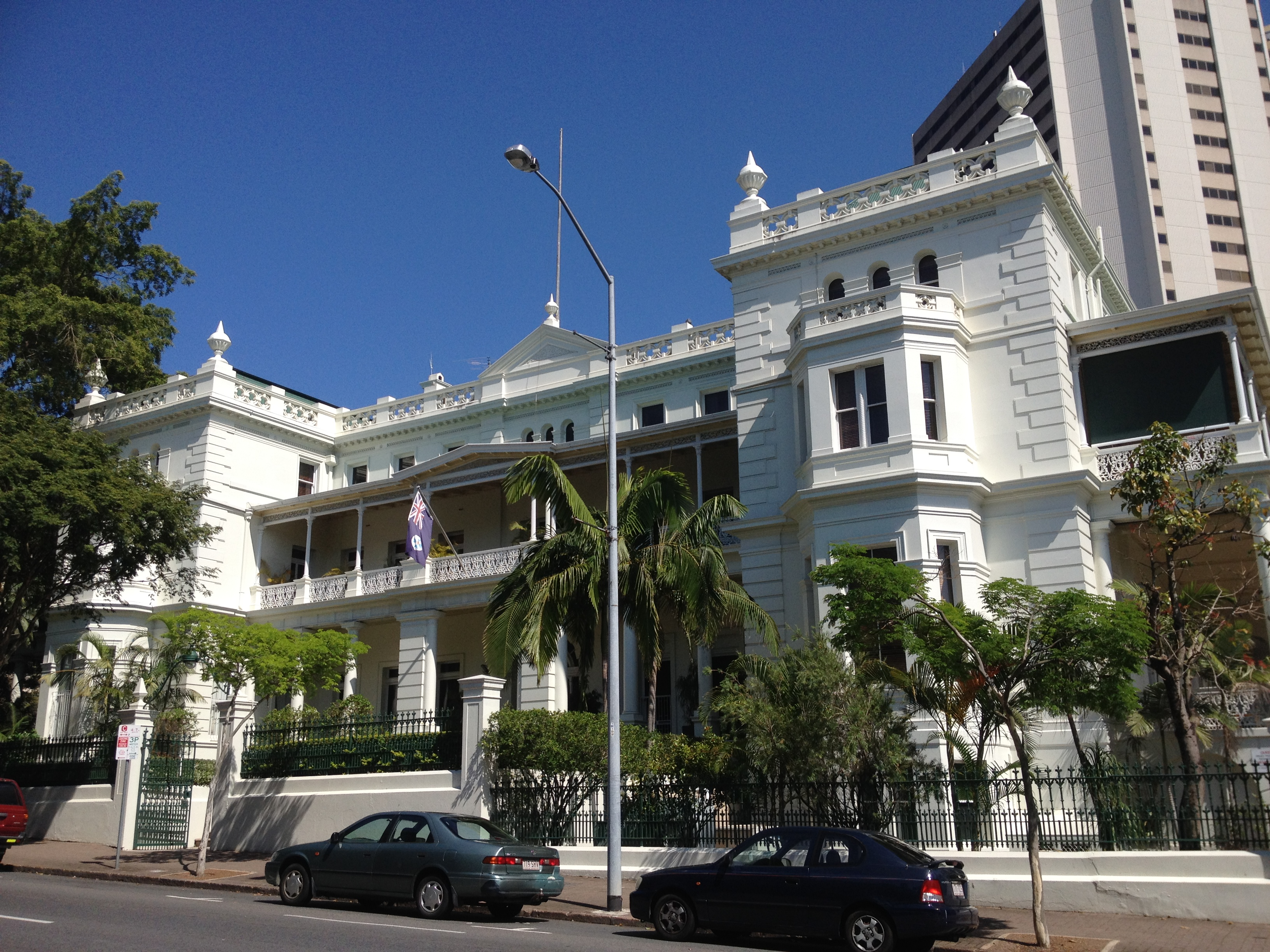
- Queensland Club, 2013

- Location within Queensland Location within Australia
- 27.4743°S 153.0273°E
- Location: 19 George Street, Brisbane City, City of Brisbane, Queensland, Australia

History
- Design period: 1870s–1890s (late 19th century)
- Built: 1882–1888

Site notes
- Architect: Francis Drummond Greville Stanley
- Architectural style: Italianate

Queensland Heritage Register
- Official name: Queensland Club
- Type: state heritage (built)
- Designated: 21 October 1992
- Reference no.: 600113
- Significant period: 1882–1884, 1888, 1900 (fabric)
- Significant components: gate – entrance, other – social/community: component, tennis court, trees/plantings, dining room, wall/s – retaining, room/unit/suite
- Builders: J Smith & Sons

Queensland Club is a heritage-listed club house at 19 George Street, Brisbane City, City of Brisbane, Queensland, Australia. It was designed by Francis Drummond Greville Stanley and built from 1882 to 1888 by J Smith & Sons. At the time it was considered one of Australia's finest neoclassical buildings.

It was designed to be a place where affluent graziers and professional men could meet away from their wives and children. The Queensland Club remains men only. It was added to the Queensland Heritage Register on 21 October 1992.

== History ==
The Queensland Club building was constructed between 1882 and 1884. The club was established in December 1859 following the apparent success of the North Australian Club in Ipswich, and coinciding with the establishment of Queensland as a separate colony. Adopting the British tradition of private clubs for influential members of the community, it provided a recreational venue and accommodation for men of common interests and socio-economic backgrounds. Members were mainly pastoralists, politicians, and business and professional men.

The club met initially in small premises in Mary Street. As membership increased, a larger venue was required and in 1881 the club purchased three allotments on the corner of George and Alice Streets, which was known as Hodgsons Corner. FDG Stanley, a member of the club, was appointed architect.

The proximity to the seat of government made it an appropriate locale for the new club premises. Stanley's plans were modified by the members and finally approved in March 1882. The contractor was J Smith and Sons and the contract sum was £14,150.

The building was opened in June 1884 and contained 41 members' bedrooms, eight bathrooms, a clubroom, dining room, billiard room, smoking room, visitors room, offices and the necessary kitchens, servants rooms and toilets, providing a "home away from home" for society's male elite.

In September 1888 the club purchased the adjoining site in Alice Street for £4,000, and stables, laundry and a bottle house were erected. Three years later these buildings were demolished and a bowling green established. The green remained mostly unused and in 1900, it was converted to a tennis court.

In 1973, a green ban was imposed on the Queensland Club by the Builders Labourers Federation to stop its destruction to make an office block, along with green bans on The Mansions and Bellevue Hotel.

In 1985 a fire caused damage to the club premises and changes to the room layout of the upper floor bedrooms were carried out in conjunction with the repair work. Minor renovations were undertaken during 1990–1991.

== Description ==
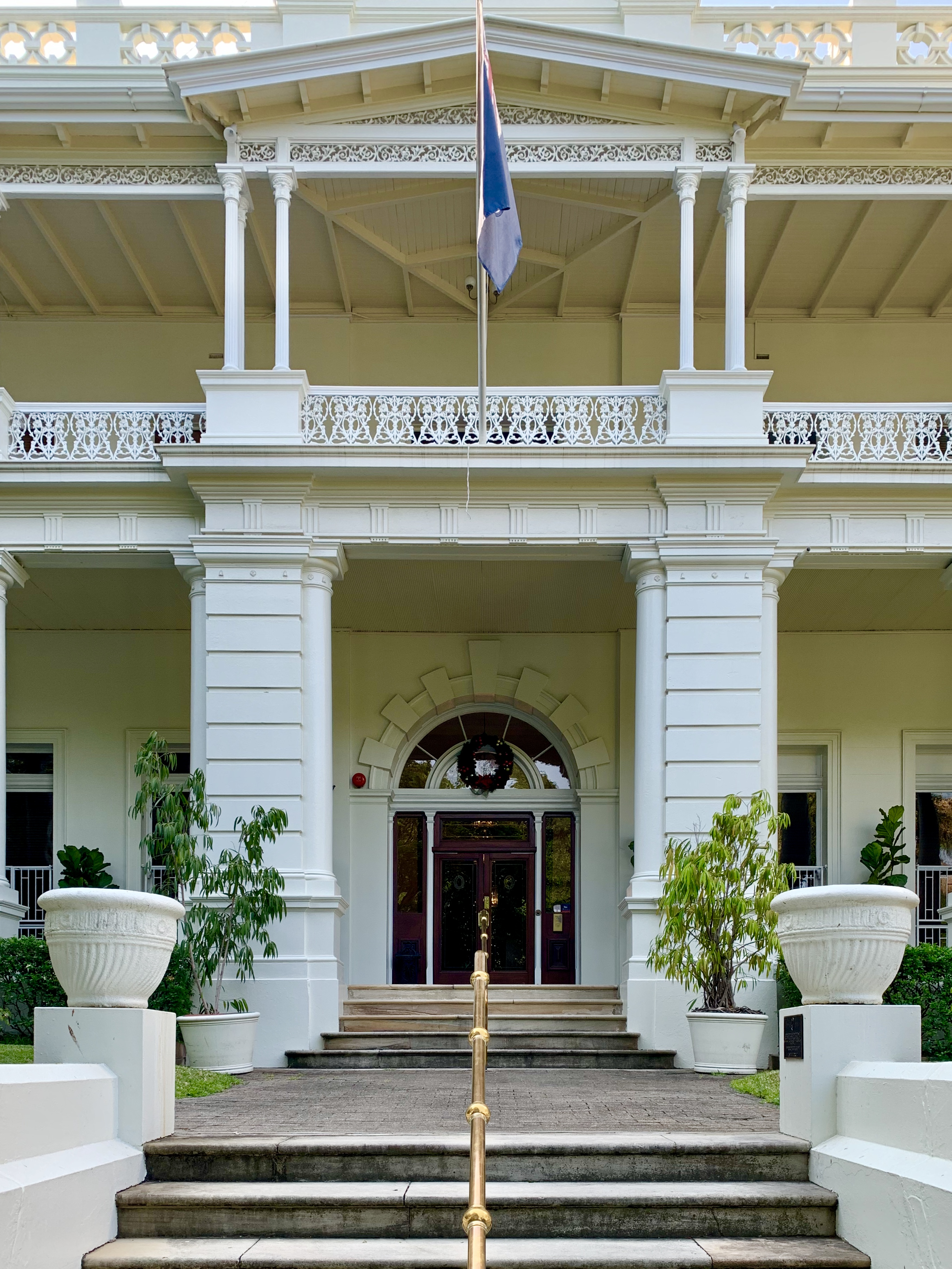
Entrance, 2019

The Queensland Club, located on the corner of Alice and George Streets diagonally opposite Parliament House, is a three-storey rendered brick building incorporating Italianate elements.

The building is a broad 'H'-shape in plan form, with its long elevation to Alice Street and one side to George Street. The main entry is in the central part of the building beneath a deep porch. There are verandahs on two levels across the front and down the side of each wing. These are supported by Tuscan columns on the ground floor and slender Corinthian cast iron columns on the first floor. The balustrades on both levels are of decorative cast ironwork.

At the end of each wing is a projecting bay window on the ground and first floor level with open balustrade above. Quoins punctuate the corners of the building and there are banded piers on either side of the entry. Above the third level the building has an open parapet and large ornate urns at the corner of each wing. A classical pediment topped by a finial is located above the entry.

The main entry has a large semi-circular fan-light. On the ground floor the windows are double hung sashes and on the first floor French-lights. The grounds contain mature trees and tennis court. The spacious entrance hall has a staircase with cast iron balustrading. The ground floor contains large and lofty reception rooms and a dining room in the northern wing. The joinery is of cedar with restrained plasterwork mostly original. The upper floors contain guest rooms.

Both street frontages are fenced with a low rendered masonry retaining wall with square piers and cast iron balustrade infill. The Alice Street main entrance features an ogee shaped cast iron arch with a central light fitting and swing gates. A section of the George Street carpark is bounded by a wire fence and a large fig tree is located in the Alice and George Street corner garden.

== Heritage listing ==
Queensland Club was listed on the Queensland Heritage Register on 21 October 1992 having satisfied the following criteria.

The place is important in demonstrating the evolution or pattern of Queensland's history.

The Queensland Club is important in demonstrating the pattern of Queensland's history as an example of the transposition of a British, class oriented gentlemen's club, to Brisbane Society.

The place is important in demonstrating the principal characteristics of a particular class of cultural places.

The building demonstrates the principal characteristics of a nineteenth century purpose built, exclusive men's club based on British tradition.

The place is important because of its aesthetic significance.

The Queensland Club exhibits particular aesthetic characteristics valued by the community through its contribution to the streetscape at Alice and George Streets, and to Parliament House and the Botanic Gardens.

The place has a special association with the life or work of a particular person, group or organisation of importance in Queensland's history.

The Queensland Club is significant for its special association with the work of architect FDG Stanley, a member of the Queensland Club.
