= Queensland Government Printing Office =

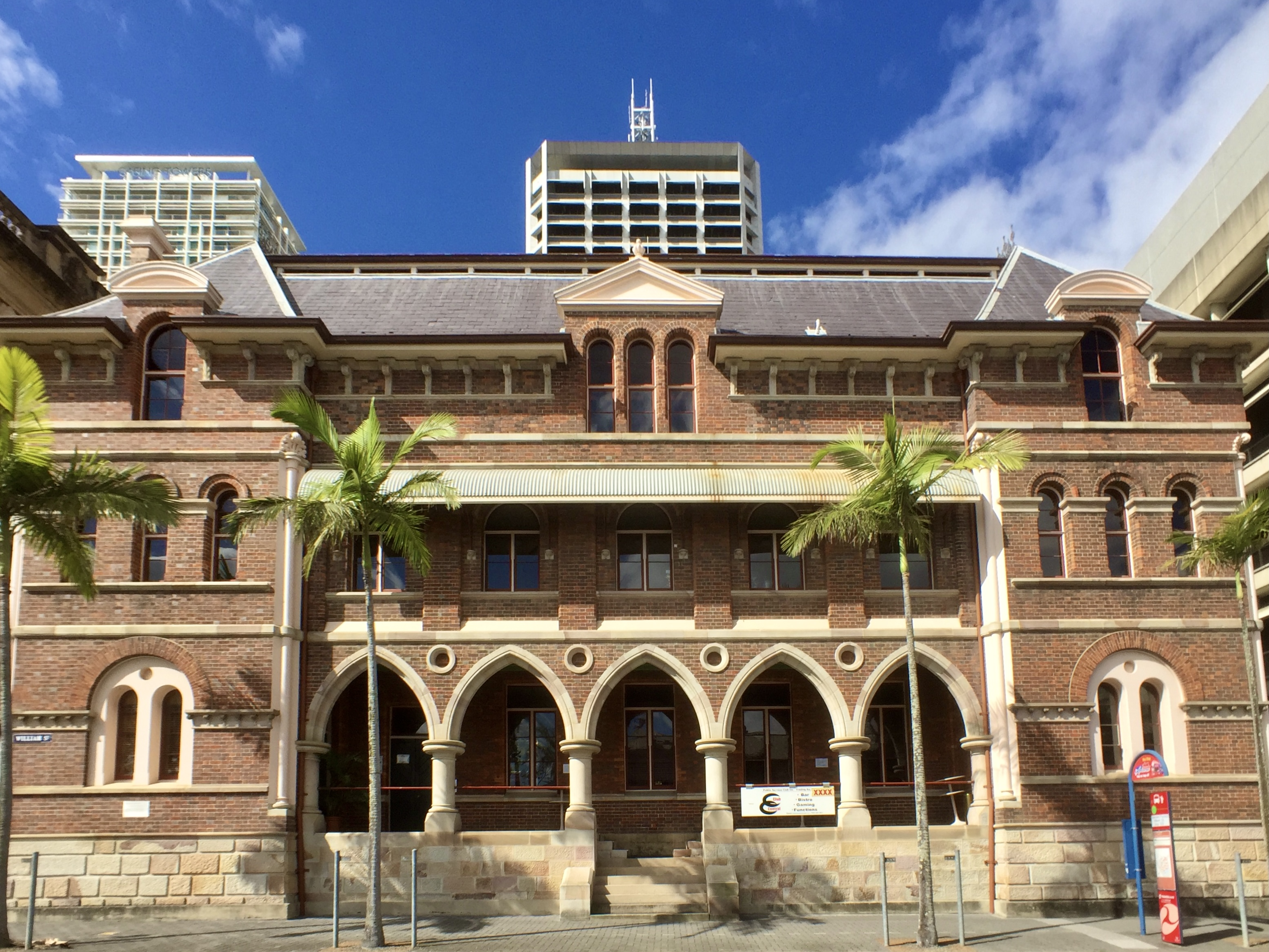
- Government Printing Office (William Street side), 2015

- Location within Queensland Location within Australia
- 27.4731°S 153.025°E
- Location: 110 George Street and 84 William Street, Brisbane City, Queensland, Australia

History
- Design period: 1870s–1890s (late 19th century)
- Built: 1884–1887
- Built for: Queensland Government

Site notes
- Architect(s): John James Clark, Francis Drummond Greville Stanley, Edwin Evan Smith
- Architectural style: Classicism

Queensland Heritage Register
- Official name: Government Printing Office (former), Former Government Printing Office, The Printing Building, Sciencentre (110 George Street), Public Services Club (84 William Street), Registry of Births, Deaths and Marriages (110 George Street)
- Type: state heritage (built)
- Designated: 21 October 1992
- Reference no.: 600114
- Significant period: 1870s–1910s (fabric); 1870s–1980s (historical)
- Builders: John Petrie, Thomas Hiron

The Queensland Government Printing Office is a heritage-listed printing house at 110 George Street and 84 William Street, Brisbane City, Queensland, Australia. It was designed by John James Clark, Francis Drummond Greville Stanley, and Edwin Evan Smith and built from 1884 to 1887 by John Petrie and Thomas Hiron. It is also known as The Printing Building, Sciencentre, Public Services Club, and Registry of Births, Deaths & Marriages. It was added to the Queensland Heritage Register on 21 October 1992.

== History ==
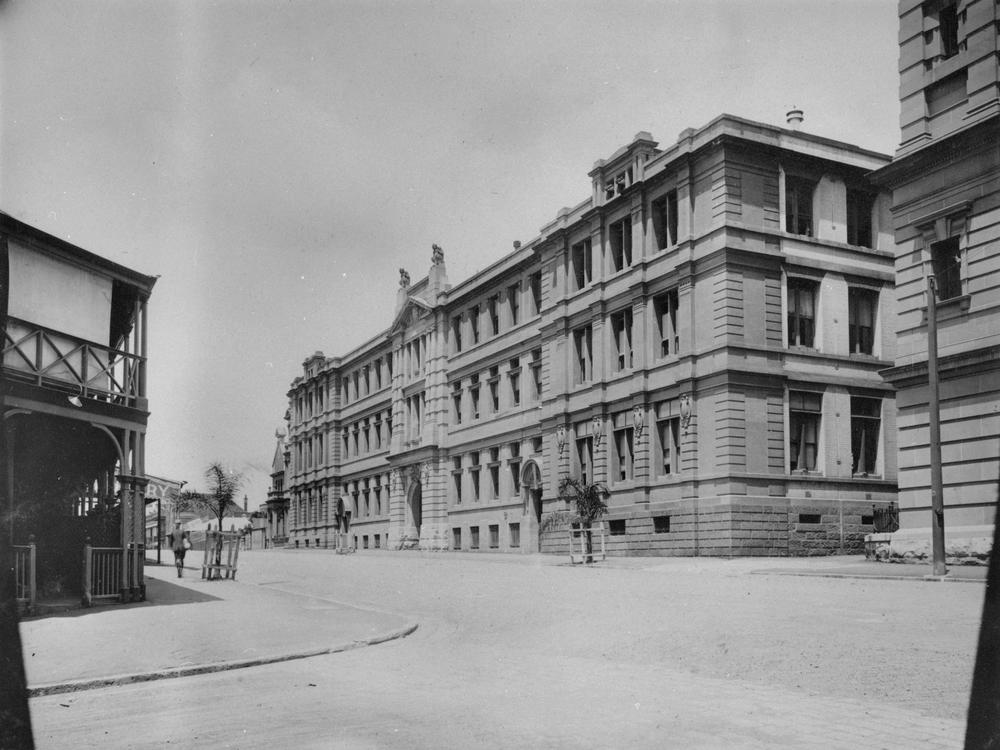
Government Printing Office (George Street side), 1920

The former Queensland Government Printing Office is located between George Street and William Street, south-east of Stephens Lane. It operated between 1862 and 1983, and consisted of a number of buildings. As the first purpose-built government printing office in Queensland, the Government Printing Office played an important role in administration of the colony and then the state of Queensland. The former Government Printing Office complex, which demonstrates the quality and evolving styles of the work of the Queensland Government Architect's Office between the 1870s and the 1910s, currently consists of two buildings, built over three different periods: a three-storey brick building facing William Street constructed 1872–1874; a three-storey brick building erected along Stephens Lane between 1884 and 1887; and a three-storey brick extension to the Stephens Lane building, constructed along George Street between 1910 and 1912.

A government printing office was required in Queensland after separation in 1859 when the establishment of the new Colonial Government generated a need for the printing of Hansard, the official report of the proceedings of the Houses of Parliament. Many other items were also printed on the premises, including postage stamps, Government Gazettes, Acts of Parliament, annual reports of departments, survey maps, text books, electoral rolls, school readers, and banknotes.

The dissemination of Hansard and other government information to the public is vital to the healthy operation of a democracy, ensuring that the business of parliament is accessible to all, and facilitating transparency regarding government decisions. The printing office was therefore integral to the operation of the Queensland Government – and its importance was reflected by its proximity to Parliament, the quality and scale of the printing office buildings, and the quality of the documents produced.

The Queensland Government Gazette was first printed by Theophilus Pugh, publisher of the Moreton Bay Courier. Pugh was replaced by William C Belbridge of the Queensland Guardian, who became the first official Government Printer by March 1862. That year the first purpose-designed government printing office in Queensland, a two-storey timber building (not extant) designed by Queensland's first Colonial Architect, Charles Tiffin, was built facing William Street on a ridge running parallel to both William Street and George Street.

Since the 1820s the north bank of the Brisbane River and the adjacent ridgeline has featured a concentration of government and associated activities and uses. This ridge was the site of administration buildings for the Moreton Bay penal settlement, which relocated from Redcliffe to Brisbane, occupying this site from 1825 to 1839. When the penal settlement closed, the remnant infrastructure was used by surveyors as a basis for the layout for the new town of Brisbane. Set at right angles to the river, the prisoner's barracks determined Queen Street, while the line of buildings along the ridge determined William Street. Streets surveyed parallel to these streets, including George Street, formed Brisbane's rectangular grid. The house and kitchen of the Commandant of the penal settlement stood on land just south-east of the Government Printing Office, until the Commandant's buildings were demolished c.1861.

While a range of buildings and activities occurred along George and William Streets after Free Settlement began in 1842, the government maintained its dominant presence in the area. At some sites, such as the Commissariat and Botanical Gardens, earlier uses were continued. The establishment phase following the creation of Queensland in 1859 saw the new colonial government reserve land parcels and construct a range of buildings to facilitate its functions. The building of Old Government House and Parliament House along the eastern end of the George Street alignment in the 1860s firmly entrenched the physical reality of a government precinct in the area.

Due to this government precinct, the Government Printing Office's immediate neighbour to the north-west, the 1851 United Evangelical Church, became a government telegraph office in 1861; hence the naming of "Telegraph Lane" between the telegraph office and the printing office. This laneway from William Street to George Street was later renamed Stephens Lane.

As Queensland grew, so did demands on the Government Printing Office. The 1862 timber building was altered in 1863 and 1864, and in 1865 an L-shaped three-storey brick-and-stone building (not extant), also designed by Tiffin, was constructed to the rear (north-east), using day labour. It included an underground cistern with a domed top (location unknown) and was connected to the 1862 building. By 1872 the complex included a small engine room, workshop and stables (none of which are extant) behind the 1865 building. That year James Beal (Government Printer 1867 to 1893) requested a new building to cope with the increased work of the Government Printing Office, and in August 1872 the Secretary for Public Works recommended that Francis Drummond Greville Stanley prepare a plan.

FDG Stanley immigrated to Queensland in 1861 and became one of the most prolific and well known Queensland architects of the late nineteenth century. In 1863 he became a clerk of works in the Office of the Colonial Architect. Upon Tiffin's retirement in 1872, Stanley became Colonial Architect, holding the position until 1881 when he entered private practice.

Stanley wanted the new building at the Government Printing Office to be constructed with machine-pressed bricks, which were not yet produced in Brisbane. At the time it was reported that he wanted "to provide as much accommodation as possible in a plain substantial building, without striving after architectural display. The structure, however...will have really a handsome and imposing appearance". Tenders were called in October 1872, and the tender of John Petrie, for £4,751 plus £170 for machine pressed bricks and £50 for internal dressing, was accepted. The building included stone footings, brick walls, cast iron airbricks to the understorey and at the ceilings, cast iron columns (ground and first floors, front wing only), and water closets (WCs) and a lift at the end of the rear wing on each floor. The roof was steeply pitched to assist ventilation. Construction was estimated to take six months, but the new office was not completed until 1874, with delays being blamed on a shortage of bricklayers. The machinery was installed and gas lights were fitted by April 1874, and the finished cost was £5331/3/6.

The front (William Street) wing of the new building stood on the site of the 1862 building, which had been demolished in late 1872. The new William Street building had an "L" shape and extended onto the (recently repurchased) land previously occupied by the Commandant's residence, wrapping around the south-east side of the 1865 building. It had an arcade to the street frontage of the ground floor, and the roof was covered in Welsh slate to reduce the risk of fire. Narrow rear verandahs were located on the north-west side of the first and second floors of the rear wing. The ground floor included a public counter, offices, newspaper room, and a large publishing room in the front wing, with a store in the rear wing. The first floor consisted of a composing room in the front wing, with a drying room in the rear wing; while the second floor contained a binding room in the front wing and a ruling room in the rear wing. It was connected to the 1865 building, which included a machine printing room on the ground floor, the engraving and lithographic work on the first floor, and machine ruling and book binding on the second floor.

In 1879 the neighbouring telegraph office (former church) was converted into the residence of the Government Printer, and in 1880 the engine room at the rear of the 1865 building was enlarged and the stables were demolished. More land was purchased in 1883, prior to further expansion of the Government Printing Office complex onto land to the south-east. A master plan for the Government Printing Office, drawn in 1884, planned a U-shaped building along Telegraph Lane, George Street, and returning along the south-east side of the complex, wrapping around a new engine room. It also planned a replication of the William Street building on the other side of a "cart entrance" from William Street to the engine room, but this never occurred.

Instead, between 1884 and 1887 three new buildings were constructed, all by John Petrie: a three-storey brick building along Telegraph Lane, with a short elevation to George Street; a two-storey brick engine room (not extant) to the south-east; and a two-storey brick Lithographic Office (not extant) south-east of the engine room. The 1880 engine room extension to the rear of the 1865 building was demolished around this time.

John Petrie's tender of £13,043 (initially for a two-storey building on Telegraph Lane and the engine room) was accepted in July 1884, plus an extra £8000 in 1885 for the addition of a third storey to the Telegraph Lane building, plus the Lithographic Office. The Telegraph Lane building, which was separated from the 1865 building by a yard, included a basement; a machine room on the ground floor; reading rooms, fount, paper, material and store rooms on first floor; and a composing room on the second floor. The design has been attributed to John James Clark, Colonial Architect from 1883 to 1885. The engine room was completed in late 1885, and housed steam engines and generators which supplied electricity for Queensland's Parliament House from 1886, plus smaller steam engines for powering the Government Printing Office's machinery. The other two new buildings were finished in early 1887.

Changes were later also made to the older buildings within the complex, including the addition of four cast iron columns on the first floor of the front wing of the William Street building in 1890; increasing the height of the 1865 building in 1891 to improve ventilation; and lowering the level of William Street in 1892, requiring construction of a concrete plinth to protect the foundations of the William Street building. In 1897 the brick wall between the public office and accountant's office in the William Street building was removed, with the addition of an extra iron column in its place. In 1900 zinc roof sheets on the flatter section of the roof of William Street building were replaced with galvanised rib and pans steel. In 1903 the level of Telegraph Lane, which by now had been renamed Stephens Lane, was lowered. Nearby, in 1901 the neighbouring former church was demolished to allow construction of an Executive Building which later became the Land Administration Building.

The ongoing development of the city and its wharves downstream from the original convict site meant that George Street had become more important than William Street by this time. A three-storey brick extension of the Stephens Lane building along George Street, which became the new "front" for the Government Printing Office, was commenced in 1910, while an additional three-storey brick extension (not extant) between the Stephens Lane building and the William Street building required the demolition of (with possible incorporation of parts of) the 1865 brick building. The George Street wing was built by Thomas Hiron, who tendered £21,450, while the Stephens Lane infill building was constructed by J Maskrey, who tendered £2896. The George Street wing was finished around mid 1912.

The 1910 plans for the George Street wing were signed by Alfred Barton Brady, Queensland Government Architect, and by Andrew Irving, acting deputy Government Architect, while 1911 plans are signed by Thomas Pye, Deputy Government Architect. However, the design of the George Street wing has been attributed to Edwin Evan Smith, a draughtsman who had assisted Thomas Pye with the design of the Executive Building, and who later became the State Government Architect for Victoria. Smith, also a painter, potter and sculptor, and an examiner in modelling for the Brisbane Technical College, designed the sculptures on the building. These include two freestanding devils on the parapet above the main entrance and a relief carved devil's head, directly above the entrance. Traditionally, devils are a symbol of the printing trade, generally accepted as representing printer's apprentices.

These details were sculpted by well known Sydney sculptor, William Priestly MacIntosh who arrived in Sydney from Edinburgh in 1880 and from 1890 was Sydney's leading architectural sculptor. He received many commissions in New South Wales; his major work being the Queen Victoria Market. Macintosh arrived in Brisbane in 1903 to complete his major Queensland work, the Executive Building, and was also responsible for the sculptural details on the former Government Savings Bank.

The George Street wing connected with both the 1887 Stephens Lane building and the 1887 Lithographic Office, forming a "U" around the engine room. It was symmetrical, with the main entrance in the centre and secondary entrances and stair halls either side of the central section. There was an electric lift adjacent to each stair hall, and a basement. Whereas the roof of the Stephens Lane wing was supported on timber queen bolt trusses, the George Street wing used timber queen post trusses; and while cast iron columns had been used to support the main floor beams in the Stephens Lane wing, hardwood columns were used in the George Street wing. It appears that the new building was considered a model for Government Printing Offices, as the South Australian Government Printer requested copies of the plan to assist in the design and extension of the Adelaide Printery building.

Two storeys were also added to the engine room c.1910, and its use appears to have changed at this time to include a Sterro Room and workshop on the ground floor; men's and women's clubs, dining rooms and lavatories on the first floor; reading rooms on the second floor; and lavatories and toilets on the third floor.

In 1910 plans the George Street wing's basement included stock rooms and a strong room; the ground floor (from the south-east to the north-west) contained an extension to the lithographic room (from the adjacent Lithographic Office), dispatch room, offices and a public counter; while the first floor contained another extension to the lithographic room plus bookbinding (an extension to the Stephens Lane wing's bookbinding floor). The second floor was used by compositors, in an extension of the function of the second floor of the Stephens Lane wing.

By this time the William Street building had been reduced to secondary or service functions, including printing of railway tickets. The ground floor was a store, the first floor was used as a machine ruling room, and the second floor was the artists and process workroom. Around this time new windows were inserted to the top floor and new dormers were added to the roof (all since removed), and the toilets and lift at the end of the rear wing were demolished. From the end of the first floor rear verandah, a gallery ran to the former engine room and the Lithographic Office.

In 1912 electricity was connected to all buildings on the site by the Edison and Swan United Electric Light Company Ltd. Various other improvements were made to the building over the years, including strengthening of the floors and installation of fire sprinklers. By 1916 there were three small, one-storey buildings (stores and a workshop, not extant) in the corner of the complex, located between the William Street building and the Lithographic Office. Soon afterwards, the importance of the Government Printing Office in disseminating information to the public was demonstrated. In November 1917 the Australian military conducted a night raid on the Government Printing Office to seize copies of Hansard which the Federal Government did not wish circulated, as they covered debates in the Queensland Parliament on military censorship and the conscription issue. The military also temporarily took possession of the Government Printing Office in August 1918, this time to prevent coverage of statements made in the Queensland Parliament about the treatment of Irish and German internees.

Changes to the site continued before and after World War II. In 1924 some of the roof slates of the William Street building were replaced with iron sheets, and more were replaced in 1933. In 1952 toilets were built at the rear of William Street building, and in 1959 the Lithographic Office was extended towards the engine room and a concrete floor was laid to most of the ground floor of the Stephens Lane wing. In 1970 a new metal-clad building (not extant) was constructed south-west of the Lithographic Office, demolishing the c.1916 workshop.

Meanwhile, the immediate post-war years of the late 1940s saw the Queensland Government begin to expand their activities considerably in Brisbane city. Most public servants were then located in the Treasury and Executive Buildings in George Street and in offices in Anzac Square. The shortage of office accommodation in the centre of Brisbane, and the need to address future requirements, led to a phase of governmental property acquisition in the city. The purchase of properties on George and William Streets between the Government Printing Office and Parliament House was a key focus, in addition to other acquisitions on Charlotte, Mary and Margaret Streets.

The consolidation of government ownership and usage along George and William streets led to a number of schemes being investigated by the state to further the development of a "government precinct". By 1965, a masterplan had been developed that involved the demolition of all buildings between the old Executive Building and Parliament House, to enable the construction of three high-rise office buildings in a "plaza setting". However, only one of these was built between 1968 and 1971 a new Executive Building was constructed south-east of the Government Printing Office. By the early 1970s the 1960s plan for the precinct was considered no longer suitable and a number of other proposals for the area were explored.

A 1974 "George Street Masterplan" involved lower-rise buildings spread out over greater areas and the demolition of the Bellevue Hotel and The Mansions. A major influence in ultimately shaping the layout of the area during the 1970s was the growing community support for the retention of older buildings within the government precinct, especially the Belle Vue Hotel and the Mansions. Spearheaded by the National Trust, the government-related associations and links between buildings, their architectural qualities, and aesthetic contributions to the area were highlighted in submissions to the government and in the public sphere. The unannounced June 1974 removal of the balconies of the Belle Vue Hotel was a deliberate action by the State government to degrade the visual appearance of the area, and drew further attention to the conservation cause.

In April 1979 Cabinet adopted a recommendation for a schedule of demolition work to further the development of the government precinct. The Belle Vue Hotel was to be demolished, but the Mansions and the original section of Harris Terrace were to be retained, renovated and adapted. On 21 April, three days after this decision, the Belle Vue Hotel was demolished in the early hours of the morning, a notorious event in the history of heritage conservation in Queensland.

The Government Printing Office moved to new premises in Woolloongabba in October 1983, and a number of former Government Printing Office buildings were demolished in 1986–1987 to make way for a four-storey Executive Annex, connected to the 1971 Executive Building, and a four-level underground car park. The Lithographic Office, former engine room, the two remaining c. 1916 buildings, the 1970s building, the toilets at the rear of the William Street building and the Stephens Lane infill building were demolished. The construction of the car park under the site of the engine room and up to the south-east side and rear of the rear wing of the William Street building removed the remaining archaeological traces of the Commandant's cottage and kitchen with cellar, although the material was recorded by staff from the Queensland Museum. The Commandant's cottage and kitchen wing are defined in outline by contrasting coloured bricks and sandstone in the new paving laid in 1987. The remaining section of the Commandant's cottage would have been under the footprint of the rear wing of the William Street building, but construction of a small basement (c. 1987) of reinforced concrete beneath the rear wing would have destroyed any surviving material.

In 1989 the Queensland Museum Sciencentre moved into the William Street building, and prior restoration and renovation work undertaken in 1986–1988 included: the demolition of non-original dormer windows and restoration of the clerestory, reconstruction of the roof framing and replacement of the corrugated iron roofing with slate and galvanised steel sheeting, and reconstruction of the rear verandah. Removal, reconstruction or restoration of doors and windows took place, and some external openings were sealed, while some new windows and doors were inserted. The existing ground floor slab and flooring was replaced, along with sections of the front wing's timber flooring on the first and second floors. The rear wing's floors were replaced with reinforced concrete suspended slabs. Other strengthening of floors utilised steel beams and trusses, and all casements were replaced as pivot windows.

The George Street/Stephens Lane building was renovated between 1987 and 1991 with work including: replacement roof sheeting, the formation of new walls where the Stephens Lane infill building and Lithographic Office had been demolished, construction of a glass-walled arcade on the south-east wall of the Stephens Lane wing, a tiered theatre at the south-east end of the second floor of the George Street wing, removal of the original lifts in the George Street wing and installation of two new lifts and toilets at the George Street end of the Stephens Lane wing, a new stairwell at the south-west end of the Stephens Lane wing, plus a light court extension from the basement to the courtyard and a link from the basement to the underground car park.

The Sciencentre moved from the William Street building into the George Street/Stephens Lane building in 1992, from where it operated until 2002. In 1993 the William Street building's interior was remodelled for commercial use as the Public Services Club, and in 2005–2006 the George Street wing was refurbished for use by the Registrar of Births, Deaths and Marriages, with a complete new fit-out and closure of the main entrance.

== Description ==
The former Queensland Government Printing Office is sited within an important precinct of substantial masonry buildings built for other government uses. It comprises two separate buildings: one facing William Street, the other facing George Street, with a paved courtyard between. The buildings have noticeably robust structural systems and open floor plans lit by many large windows. Stephens Lane (easement not road reserve) runs along the north-western side and, together with a cart lane (access route not road reserve) adjacent to the south-eastern elevation of the William Street building, provides access to the courtyard. The fronts of the buildings are more decorative than the rear and side elevations.

The William Street building, located on the corner of William Street and Stephens Lane, is a three-storeyed building with a steeply pitched mansard roof clad with slate on the steep portion and rib and pan galvanised steel sheets on the shallow remainder. It is L-shaped, comprising a William Street wing and a rear wing around a fenced, paved rear courtyard accessible from the courtyard. The roof has a clerestory of narrow, amber-coloured, fixed glazing at the change in pitch and lengths of cast iron ridge cresting. The building has a rusticated sandstone plinth and brick walls. The front and side walls are face brick while the rear walls are painted with areas of render where extensions have been demolished. Two brick chimneys with distinctive shaped cappings are located at the Stephens Lane end of the building.

The William Street facade is primarily symmetrical with a ground floor colonnade of five pointed arches between two slightly projecting bays. Blind circular openings are located in the infills between each arch. The colonnade is reached via central stone stairs. Five sets of horizontal-pivot timber sash windows align with the five arches of the colonnade. The entry is asymmetrical and located at the Stephens Lane end of the colonnade. The two end bays have stop-chamfered corners to the ground and first floors which are rendered and painted. Engaged columns capped with foliated convex elements are located within the stop chamfers. Each end bay has a centrally located segmental arch which surrounds a rendered section containing two lancet-type windows with semi-circular heads. The first floor levels have three similarly styled windows, symmetrically placed, and the second floor levels have larger scale windows which project above the eaves line and have curved pediments. A variety of bonds make up the brickwork, including English, Flemish, and English Garden Wall. The bricks of the William Street wing are discernibly better quality than those of the rear wing and have struck or ruled pointing. Carved sandstone brackets line the eaves.

The Stephens Lane elevation is similar in detail to the front elevation, with rendered arches containing multiple lancet-type windows at ground floor level and a concave corrugated iron awning over the first floor windows. The string courses of the front elevation continue around this elevation.

The south-eastern cart lane is paved and the bricks on this face of the building are heavily scored and scratched from the passing of vehicles.

The rear elevations are less decorative. A combination of arched and rectangular windows is used on all levels and a number of windows and doors at the rear of the building have been bricked in. A partially enclosed timber verandah is located on the north-west elevation of the rear wing. The courtyard garden is formed by modern steel partitions to enclose an outdoor seating area.

The building is structurally composite. The entire ground floor is concrete slab with a crawl space underneath the William Street wing and a small basement under the rear wing that connects to the underground car park behind the building. The remaining floors of the William Street are timber and those of the rear wing are concrete. The services including lifts, stairs, kitchens, cold rooms and toilets are located in the rear wing and are not of cultural heritage significance. The William Street wing comprises predominantly open spaces.

The building has a rear entry into the rear wing that has become the main entrance. The ground and first floor levels of the William Street wing are similar in design, with original joinery, iron columns, and exposed rafters and beams. Walls are rendered and painted. The William Street wing is partitioned on ground level into three rooms, each with a fireplace. The rooms retain finely detailed joinery and ceilings are beaded tongue and groove timber board ceilings with timber mouldings. Generally, the building retains early and original door and window hardware.

The second floor of the William Street wing is notable for its exposed roof structure comprising multiple sets of Queens post trusses with unusual tusk tenon detailing and rafters. Members are stop-chamfered. The ceiling comprises beaded boarding laid diagonally and is raked to follow the mansard roof. The roof members and ceiling are stained dark brown. The amber-coloured glass in the clerestory is also used in the top of windows to William Street and Stephens Lane. The walls are bagged and painted brick. Elements not of cultural heritage significance in the building include: post-1983 elements such as the basement, the escape stair at the junction of the two wings, the partitions and suspended ceilings in the rear wing, any replica cast iron columns not in their original positions, steel strengthening of the roof framing, the rear verandahs, reconstructed chimney sections, air conditioning ducts, and the modern fit-out and joinery.

The George Street building is a substantial brick building of three storeys and a partial basement forming an L-shape around a rear courtyard. One wing of the building fronts George Street and the other fronts Stephens Lane and both have slightly different structural systems. The George Street wing has timber floor and roof framing supported by large timber columns with timber bolsters. The Stephens Lane wing has a concrete floor to the ground floor and timber floor and roof framing supported by cast iron columns.

The George Street facade is symmetrically composed around a central, slightly projecting entrance bay with wings both side terminating in a pavilion. It is in a Classical Revival style. The facade is primarily smooth rendered above a rusticated porphyry base and the entrance bay and two subsidiary entrances are sandstone. The facade comprises many square headed windows with square-formed string courses. Decorative features are primarily restricted to the ground floor and include rendered details and carved stonework.

The entrance bay has a rusticated base of granite and an arch leads to an inset porch with stairs up to the entrance doors. These doors are timber with stained glass panels and side lights depicting various printing techniques. Above the arch is a relief carved devil's face and banners with the words "PRINTING OFFICE" and the date "1910". A large entablature separates the ground level from the upper two levels which have double pilasters rising through both levels on either side of windows. The pilasters have Ionic order capitals with the faces of devils between the volutes and the two sets of windows are double hung and have balustrades in front of them. The pilasters support a broken-bed pediment with relief carving to the tympanum featuring the Queensland Coat of Arms. Above the pediment is a parapet with pedestals at either end supporting sculpted stone devils holding shields bearing the printer's emblem.

The Stephens Lane and rear elevations reflect the subsidiary and functional nature of the lane frontage and "back of house" conditions. A lightly rusticated porphyry base supports painted brick walls with many square headed windows. The rear elevations of the two wings are face brick but of discernibly different bricks on either wing. The Stephens Lane wing has dark brown face brick laid in English bond with segmental arches of red brick over the windows. The windows are two paned casement windows and the sills are either painted stone or rendered. The ground level is an arcade of arched openings forming a covered walkway with a glazed wall forming the enclosure to the interior offices.

The rear elevation of the George Street wing is in red face brick in an English bond with lighter red brick headers. The windows are two paned double hung timber sashes with stone sills. The first and second floors have a balcony that extends the length of the building and curves to provide access into the Stephens Lane wing. It has a cast iron handrail and is supported by cast iron brackets. The same brackets support the extended eaves to the second level.

Access to the George Street wing is from the rear courtyard. The original entrance from George Street is sealed and a new glass partition and door of recent construction are located directly in front of these internally. The interior spaces are large with high ceilings. The Stephens Lane wing has timber tongue and groove ceilings and the George Street wing has ripple iron ceilings on the ground and first floors and timber boards on the second floor. Walls are either plastered and painted, or sandblasted brick. The building has four ventilated and glazed roof lanterns; three in the Stephens Lane wing and one large one in the George Street wing.

To either side of the now-disused George Street entrance are offices with partitions of French polished silky oak and maple and clear glazing above. The main doors into these areas also have stained glass panels and the remainder have etched glass panels with lettering designating the office use. Ceilings and cornices in these areas are pressed metal. Post-1983 elements not of cultural heritage significance include: reconstructed walls at the south end of the Stephens Lane wing and the east end of the George Street wing, the link to the Executive Annex, modern partitions and fit-out, and new work in the basement.

The courtyard between the two buildings is planted with jacarandas and forms the roof of a four-storey underground concrete car park which is not of cultural heritage significance. Other elements within the cultural heritage boundary which have no cultural heritage significance include the stone capping to the wall along Stephens Lane; the modern fabric of the courtyard garden of the Public Services Club, on the site of the 1865 building; the light well to the basement of the George Street wing; and vents to the underground car park. Adjacent to the William Street building and also fronting William Street is the Executive Annexe, a four-storey concrete building that is not of cultural heritage significance.

== Heritage listing ==
The former Queensland Government Printing Office was listed on the Queensland Heritage Register on 21 October 1992 having satisfied the following criteria.

The place is important in demonstrating the evolution or pattern of Queensland's history.

The Queensland Government Printing Office was the first purpose-built government printery in Queensland and operated on the site from 1862 to 1983, playing an essential part in the administration of Queensland for 121 years. The dissemination of Hansard and other government information is an important part of democracy, promoting public access to parliamentary debate and facilitating transparency regarding government decisions. The expansion of the site and addition of new buildings over time was a result of the growth of the Queensland Government and its functions.

As part of a government precinct that has existed since 1825, the place helps to demonstrate the early importance of this part of Brisbane to the administration of the Moreton Bay penal settlement and later the colony and state of Queensland. The proximity of the printing office to Parliament is also a reflection of its important role in government.

The former Government Printing Office buildings fit within a pattern of substantial, well designed masonry buildings constructed to the designs of colonial and government architects. The structures show an adaption to Queensland's climate and the increased availability of materials and skills over time, including improvements in brick manufacturing processes. The designs of the constituent buildings also demonstrate the increased ambitiousness of the projects of the Colonial/Government Architect's Office between the 1870s and the 1910s.

The survival of the main Government Printing Office buildings, despite 1960s plans for the demolition of the complex, demonstrates how increased public concern about the preservation of heritage buildings influenced government redevelopment plans during the 1970s and 1980s.

The place demonstrates rare, uncommon or endangered aspects of Queensland's cultural heritage.

The former Queensland Government Printing Office was the only government printing office in Queensland from 1862 to 1983.

The place has potential to yield information that will contribute to an understanding of Queensland's history.

The place has the potential to reveal information that will contribute to our understanding of Queensland's history. There is the potential for sub-surface material to survive relating to the first printing office (1862), particularly the foundations, as well as material relating to the 1865 building, including an underground cistern and associated stables.

The place is important in demonstrating the principal characteristics of a particular class of cultural places.

Located within a government precinct, the buildings of the former Queensland Government Printing Office continue to demonstrate the principal characteristics of a nineteenth-/early twentieth-century printing office. The interiors have good natural lighting and ventilation and are plain and robust compared to the more elaborate street appearance. The buildings feature smaller, more finely detailed administration areas supporting large production areas and substantial structural framing provides unobstructed floor areas and allows for heavy floor loadings. Access to the rear of the buildings was provided, at different times, via Stephens Lane and the cart lane south-east of the Williams Street building.

The use of brick walls, as well as the use of slate on the William Street building's roof, demonstrates the precautions taken against the threat of fire, while the skylights on the top floor of the Stephens Lane/George Street building demonstrates the compositors' need for good natural light.

The carved Queensland crest, printers' devils, and leaded stained glass with images of the printing process on the George Street wing are also indications of the place's former status and use. At the time of construction, the design of the 1910–1912 George Street wing was considered to be a model for other state printing offices.

The William Street building is a good example of the work of the Colonial Architect, Francis Drummond Greville Stanley, while the George Street wing of the Government Printing Office is an excellent example of the work of Edwin Evan Smith, a draughtsman in the Government Architect's Office, and the Sydney sculptor William P Macintosh.

The place is important because of its aesthetic significance.

The former Queensland Government Printing Office is an integral part of the most prominent and cohesive group of government buildings in Queensland. A major landmark in the city of Brisbane, together with the former Treasury Building, former Land Administration Building, and Queens Gardens situated between William and George Streets, the former Government Printing Office contributes to both streetscapes. Other buildings in the group include the former State Library, former Commissariat Stores and the former Department of Primary Industries Building on William Street; and the former Family Services Building on George Street. Unified by quality design, materials, form, finish and workmanship, this group of visually cohesive buildings dominate the southern edge of the central business district, adjacent to the north bank of the Brisbane River. The view down, and access along, Stephens Lane enhances the visual appreciation of the former Government Printing Office and former Land Administration Building.

The buildings within the complex display a high degree of design and workmanship internally and externally. The 1872–1874 William Street building is differentiated within the precinct by its distinctively steeply pitched roof form, awnings, arcade and dark face-brickwork skilfully relieved with stone detailing. The 1887 Stephens Lane building and its 1910–1912 George Street wing share a uniformity and convention in scale symmetry and classical detailing with the other George Street government buildings. The detailing of the George Street entrance with sculpted stone printers' devils over the entry is of particular aesthetic value.

The place has a special association with the life or work of a particular person, group or organisation of importance in Queensland's history.

The site has a long and close association with the Queensland Government Printing Office, a department which played an important role in the administration of Queensland through its dissemination of government information to the public.
