= Raid on the Queensland Government Printing Office =

Australian Government raid for anti-conscription transcripts

Coordinates: 27.4731°S 153.025°E

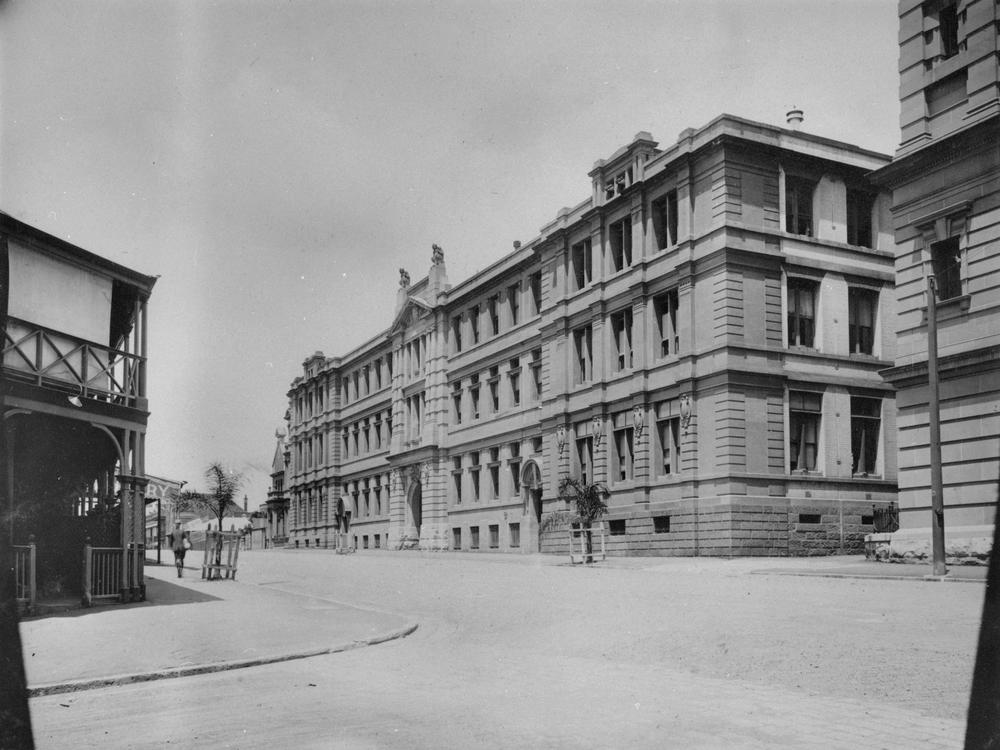
The Government Printing Office in 1920

In November 1917 during World War I, the Australian Government conducted a raid on the Queensland Government Printing Office in Brisbane. The aim of the raid was to confiscate any copies of the Hansard, the official parliamentary transcript, which documented anti-conscription sentiments that had been aired in the state's parliament.

== Background ==
Following Australia's entry into the first World War, thousands of Queenslanders enlisted in the military to go and fight in Europe. However, as the war dragged on and it became evident that victory would not be achieved quickly or easily, the initial enthusiasm for the conflict waned and recruitment rates began to decline. The British government, needing fresh manpower to bolster its reserves in France, pressured the Australian federal government to send more reinforcements. The federal government, led by Billy Hughes, did not have the numbers to legislate for compulsory military service (conscription), and Hughes held a plebiscite in 1916 in an attempt to win the necessary political support to conscript able-bodied men and send them to Europe. This plan was derailed when, amongst much community division and controversy, the plebiscite returned a "No" result. The resulting political fallout led Hughes to leave his party, forming an alliance with former political foes, and a second plebiscite was called in an attempt to overturn the result of the previous one.

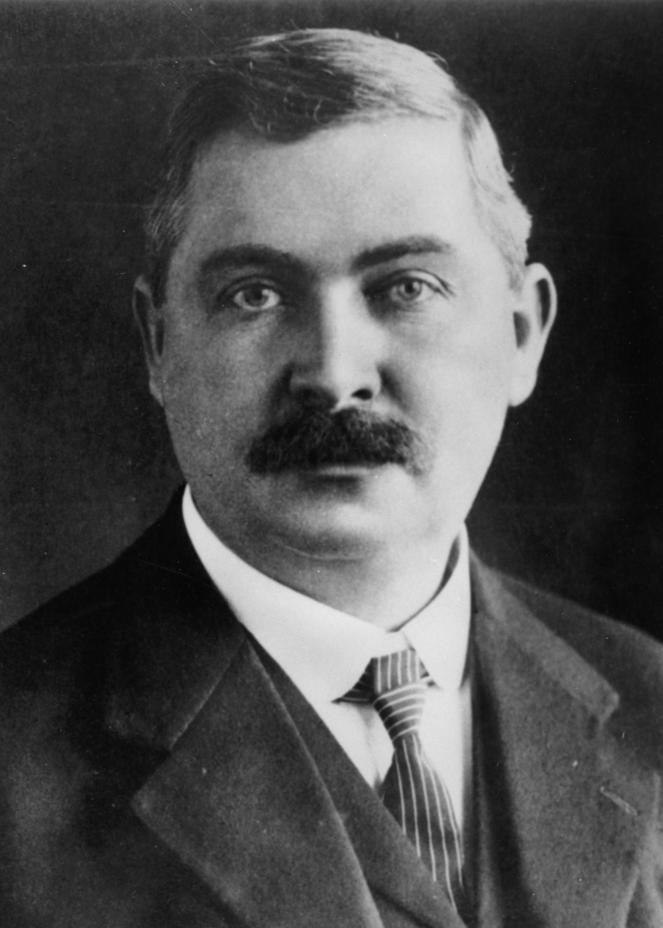
T. J. Ryan, Premier of Queensland in 1917

The Queensland Government had originally been mildly supportive of the notion of conscription, but this ended with the defeat of the Commonwealth Liberal government under Digby Denham, and the election of a Labor government led by T. J. Ryan in 1915. Initially ambivalent about the issue (Ryan having deferred from signing a letter in support of conscription in the days before the 1916 vote) the Ryan government's stance hardened by late 1916, as the position of the party's rank-and-file membership swung decisively to opposing compulsory service. This opposition was not welcomed by Hughes, and Ryan was the only state premier to openly oppose the federal government on the issue. The split became serious by 1917, with Ryan acknowledged as the de facto leader of those advocating a "No" vote in the 1917 plebiscite on conscription, and the state and federal government at odds on other issues including industrial disputes, price controls, and coastal shipping.

The federal government responded to this anti-conscription sentiment in the community with a series of censorship measures, enabled by the War Precautions Act 1914 which permitted the federal government to censor speech which in their view would have interfered with the war effort. Some of these censorship measures were unorthodox even for the time; the public performance of I Didn't Raise My Boy to Be a Soldier was prohibited, a ban that was openly flouted by radical anti-conscription campaigner Cecilia John. An Australian Government regulation was issued in 1917 prohibiting over 200 publications, as diverse as Hearst newspapers from America, The Cincinnati Enquirer, Harpers Bazaar, as well as seemingly innocuous publications such as Cosmopolitan, Motor, and Good Housekeeping. Premier Ryan and Treasurer Ted Theodore, finding the situation intolerable, decided to counteract the actions of censor Jeremiah Stable by reading out some of the banned material on the floor of the Queensland Parliament, working on the theory that parliamentary privilege would allow a Hansard containing the material to be distributed.

== The raid ==
Hughes did not take the provocation from Ryan lightly. Because the postal service was under the control of the Australian Government, Hughes ordered federal authorities to prevent the Hansard from being distributed through the post. Travelling to Brisbane ostensibly to address a public meeting, Hughes arrived late at night with Stable and a detachment of soldiers at the Queensland Government Printing Office, seizing all 3,300 printed copies of Hansard, along with all of the type. Hughes then informed Ryan that while there was "nothing worth censoring" in his own speeches, the anti-conscription materials of Theodore and his fellow minister John Fihelly were objectionable and would not be allowed to be distributed.

Hughes also informed the Government Printer, A. J. Cummings, not to publish any further copies of the Hansard. Cummings was an ardent conscriptionist, and disclosed to Hughes that Ryan had ordered him to ignore any censorship instructions that he might receive, and that if the Army were to attempt to enter the printing office by force, the Queensland Police would "offer every assistance in their power" to prevent them from doing so. Upon learning this, an alarmed Stable, not wanting the situation to descend into violence, cabled Hughes and asked if there were any way to solve the problem without resorting to armed force.

The following day, 27 November, Ryan demanded an explanation from Hughes for the seizure of Hansard, and for the failure of the postal service to transmit copies of the Hansard to subscribers. Ryan also had a special issue of the Government Gazette issued that described the situation, and gave a general description of the contents of the Hansard, without giving any specific details that might fall afoul of the censor. Hughes responded, taking responsibility for both actions, accusing Ryan of publishing a document that was "a Hansard in name only", and putting Ryan on notice that "if some of the statements published in your so-called Hansard are repeated outside (of parliamentary privilege), I shall know how to deal with them".

A Queensland Government cabinet meeting decided that a policy of "direct confrontation" would be adopted, with armed police being stationed inside the printing office, and Ryan would be protected around the clock by an armed guard. Fihelly arranged for trade unionists from the Brisbane Industrial Council to get involved, with between four and five hundred unionists to be sworn in as special constables to maintain order should an armed struggle with the Australian Government begin. Plans were drawn up to sever railway connections, block the Brisbane River, and to seize all means of communication with the outside world.

Late on the evening of 27 November, Hughes dispatched Stable, along with his private secretary Percy Deane, to visit the printing office once more. Stable and Deane were denied entry by the policemen at the front door, and Stable was reportedly trying to scale a side wall of the building when Cummings let them in through a rear entrance, allowing Stable to inspect the presses and determine that no further copies of the offending Hansard had been printed.

== Aftermath ==
In addition to the direct confrontation at the Printing Office, Hughes also attacked Ryan and Theodore through the courts, charging them for having made false statements in relation to the availability of volunteer reinforcements. A hearing in December 1917 made a decision in favour of Ryan, awarding him costs. A second attempt to prosecute Ryan on similar grounds also failed, at which point Ryan brought charges against Hughes and Hughes brought charges against Ryan. These cases were terminated in April 1918 when both parties agreed to withdraw the cases against each other and let the matter rest.

Ryan sent a cable to the office of the Queensland Government in London after the second plebiscite, requesting publication of his government's position against conscription in England. This cable was numbered 50, and according to Ryan a response was received from the Agent-General confirming receipt of cables number 49 and 51, and enquiring about the "missing" cable 50. Suspicion immediately fell upon Hughes, but no evidence was presented and no interference on his part was ever proven. For his part, Hughes decided to insure against the "co-ordinated left-wing groups preparing to seize (Brisbane)" by arranging for the dispatch of several large crates labelled "Furniture" to the homes of certain loyalists in Brisbane, which were reputedly filled with "rifles and machine guns".

Even amongst Hughes' supporters on the pro-conscription side, opinion on the way he handled the matter were mixed. New South Wales Attorney-General David Hall opined that the dogged pursuit of Ryan had only given Ryan a higher profile and popularity than he otherwise would have enjoyed, and set him up for a national career in politics.

== See also ==
- Queensland Government Printing Office
- Queensland Government Gazette
- Hansard
