= Ralahyne =

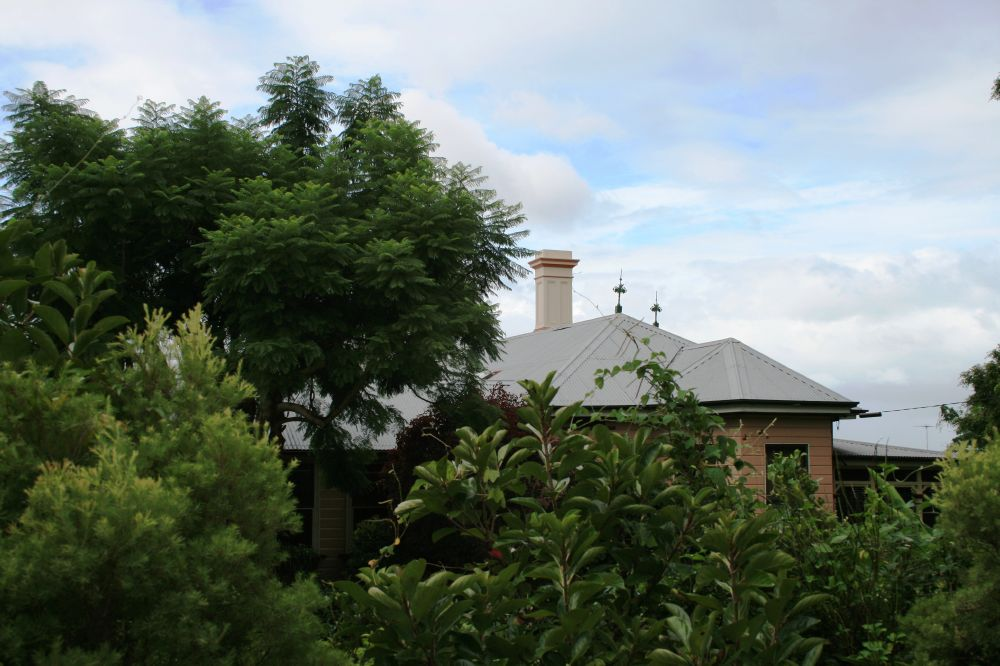
- Ralahyne, 2009

- Location within Queensland Location within Australia
- 27.4245°S 153.0564°E
- Location: 40 Enderley Road, Clayfield, City of Brisbane, Queensland, Australia

History
- Design period: 1870s–1890s (late 19th century)
- Built: 1888, 1904

Site notes
- Architect(s): George Henry Male Addison, Hall and Dods

Queensland Heritage Register
- Official name: Ralahyne, East View, Huntington, Koojarewon
- Type: state heritage (landscape, built)
- Designated: 21 October 1992
- Reference no.: 600182
- Significant period: 1880s, 1900s, 1920s (fabric); 1880s (historical)
- Significant components: garden/grounds, residential accommodation – main house, service wing, courtyard, ballroom

Ralahyne is a heritage-listed villa at 40 Enderley Road, Clayfield, City of Brisbane, Queensland, Australia. It was designed by George Henry Male Addison and built in 1888 and extended in 1904 to a design by Hall and Dods. It is also known as East View, Huntington, and Koojarewon. It was added to the Queensland Heritage Register on 21 October 1992.

== History ==
This single storeyed timber residence was built in 1888 for Robert Gray, the then under colonial secretary. It was designed by prominent architect George HM Addison and replaced a small four-roomed house on the site.

The 8 acre (3.2 hectare) property was called "East View" until 1892 then Koojarewon until 1900 and then Huntington. Gray became Commissioner of Railways in 1889 and died in 1902.

The property was bought by Ada Laird who lived there with her husband until 1907. In 1904 the Lairds engaged the firm of Hall & Dods to undertake alterations and additions to the house valued at over £1000. Huntington was sold to Annie Millar in 1907 and renamed Nowranie. The Millars lived there until 1918 when it was sold to Ruby Winten. In 1920 the property was bought by Henrietta Watson who renamed it Ralahyne. It remained in the Watson family until 1985 when it was sold to the present owners. The property has been subdivided several times.

== Description ==
Ralahyne is a single-storey timber building with a hipped roof of corrugated iron. The house is built side onto the street, with the front facade facing eastward across the grounds.

The southern elevation, which faces the street, consists of a long servants' wing which joins the dining room at the eastern end. The dining room is marked by a faceted projected bay. The eastern, or front elevation, is dominated by a wide verandah which features cast-iron balustrading and frieze panels. Twin bays, discernible only by their faceted hips in the roofline, project onto the verandah.

The northern elevation has two faceted projecting bays, one on either end, joined by a verandah similar to that along the front. At the western, or rear elevation, the ends of the northern and service wings are linked by a verandah enclosed with shutters to form a large ballroom which has a domed ceiling and skylights. This forms a shallow courtyard, the remnant of a much deeper one which once existed.

Timber ceilings are found in most rooms, the dining room featuring a coffered example with moulded beams. The drawing room has a carrara marble fireplace and two fluted columns which mark the beginning of the projecting bay. Substantial cedar joinery, including mantelpieces, is found throughout.

== Heritage listing ==
Ralahyne was listed on the Queensland Heritage Register on 21 October 1992 having satisfied the following criteria.

The place is important in demonstrating the evolution or pattern of Queensland's history.

As an expression of the confidence in the 1880s boom and the future of its owner in the public service.

The place is important in demonstrating the principal characteristics of a particular class of cultural places.

As an example of the large houses built on the hills to the northeast of the city and of the increasing use of timber and iron for these houses.

The place is important because of its aesthetic significance.

As a showcase for the design possibilities of timber, both in external features and interior decoration.

The place is important in demonstrating a high degree of creative or technical achievement at a particular period.

As a showcase for the design possibilities of timber, both in external features and interior decoration.

The place has a special association with the life or work of a particular person, group or organisation of importance in Queensland's history.

For its association with architects GHM Addison and Robin Dods.
