= George Henry Male Addison =

Australian architect and artist

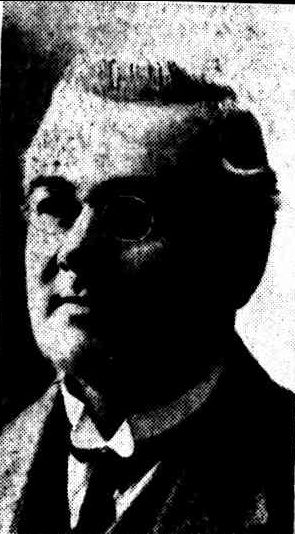
George Henry Male Addison

George Henry Male Addison (1857–1922) was an Australian architect and artist who worked mainly in Brisbane. His best known works are the Mansions in George Street, the Albert Street Uniting Church, the Old Museum Building, and the mansion Cumbooquepa in South Brisbane. Many of his buildings are now heritage-listed.

== Early life ==
Addison was born on 23 March 1857 in Llanelly, Wales, the son of Edward James Addison (1820–1863), a Wesleyan minister and Jane Roswell née Male (1833–1860). His father undertook missionary work in West Africa but it damaged his health and he died in 1863 and Addison was raised by his maternal grandfather, Henry Male in Somerset. His sister, Emily Jane Addison (1855–?) worked as a governess to the family of Alexander McArthur in Brixton and, in 1834 married their son John Percival McArthur (1858–1901).

He was articled to architect Edmund Isles Hubbard at Rotherham and studied at the Royal Academy in London.

Addison immigrated to South Australia to work on a number of large government projects. After that, he moved to Melbourne and worked for the firm Terry and Oakden, becoming a partner in 1885, the firm known as Oakden, Addison and Kemp from 1887. While there he was one of the founders of the Melbourne Art Society along with John Mather, Tom Roberts, Frederick McCubbin and other well-known artists.

In 1884 he married Emily Alice Maude with whom he had four children:

- Lily Isabel Maude Addison (1885–1968)
- Edward James Addison (1887–1956)
- George Frederick Addison (1889–1985)
- Edith May Addison (1892–?)

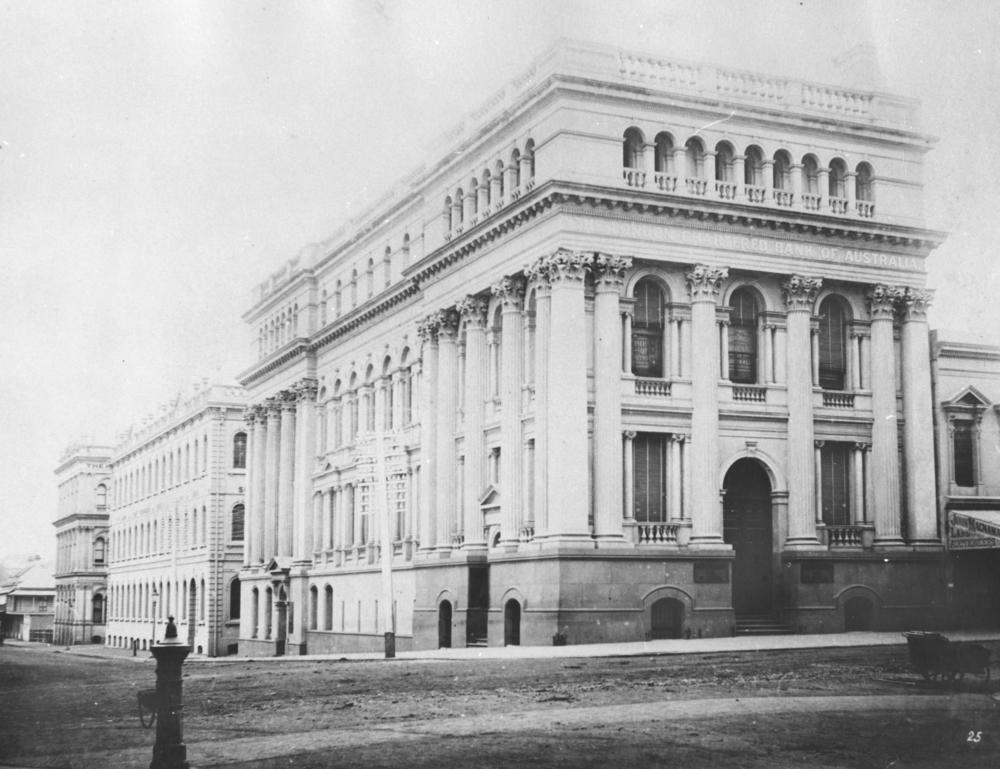
London Chartered Bank of Australia

In 1889, Addison came to Brisbane to oversee the construction of the (former) London Chartered Bank of Australia building on the corner of Queen and Creek Streets, Brisbane (demolished 1976). He liked the climate and decided to stay, still working nominally for Oakden Addison and Kemp. but designing separately, finally setting up independently in 1892. His work in tis early period introduced the Queen Anne style influence to Queensland architecture. Later he went into partnership with his son George. His daughter Lily worked as a draftswoman and then architect in her father's firm; she was one of the earliest women to practice architecture in Australia.

== Works ==
His works included:

- The Albert Street Uniting Church, Brisbane, built in 1888–89
- The villa Cliveden Mansions, built in 1888 at Spring Hill
- The villa Kirkston, built in 1888–89 at Windsor
- Extensive additions to the villa Stanley Hall at Clayfield, in 1889
- The Mansions, 40 George Street, Brisbane built in 1889.
- Fernbrook, his home in Indooroopilly built c1889. Fernbrook was eventually demolished in the 1920s and the University of Queensland silver-lead mine resides on the land.
- The villa Cumbooquepa, built in 1890 at South Brisbane, now part of Somerville House School
- The Old Museum Building, Brisbane, originally an exhibition building and concert hall built in 1891
- A religious building at All Hallows' School, a heritage-listed school at 547 Ann Street, Fortitude Valley, built in 1915
- Buildings at the Eagle Farm Racecourse including the totaliser building, the ticket offices and the latrines, built around 1913–1914
- St Columba's Church, Wilston built in 1915
- St Benedict's Catholic Church, 81 Mowbray Tce, East Brisbane built in 1917
- Sacred Heart Church, Rosalie built in 1918
- Blessed Oliver Plunkett Catholic Church, Cannon Hill in 1921

For a number of years, he was in a partnership with Leslie Corrie as Addison and Corrie. Together they designed many prominent Brisbane buildings, including:

- Trustees Chambers, a heritage-listed bank at 43 Queen Street, Brisbane built in about 1900

== Later life ==
Addison was a chairman of the Brisbane Art Gallery.

Addison died on 6 February 1922 at the Mater Misericordiae Hospital, Brisbane. He was buried at the Toowong Cemetery.
