= Kirkston =

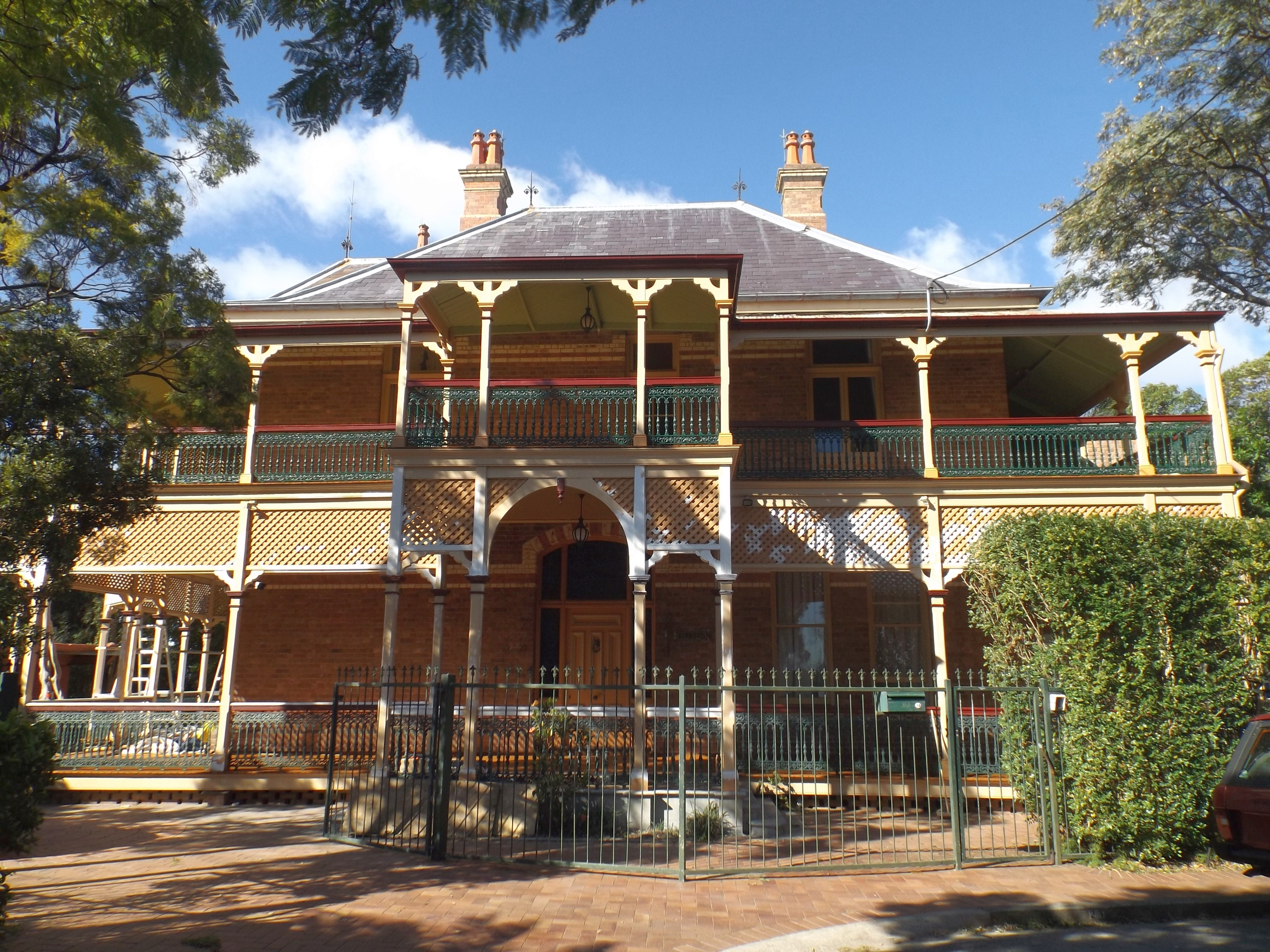
- Residence in 2015

- Location within Queensland Location within Australia
- 27.4278°S 153.0307°E
- Location: 23 Rupert Street, Windsor, City of Brisbane, Queensland, Australia

History
- Design period: 1870s–1890s (late 19th century)
- Built: 1888–1889

Site notes
- Architect: George Henry Male Addison
- Architectural style: Victorian Filigree

Queensland Heritage Register
- Official name: Kirkston
- Type: state heritage (built)
- Designated: 21 October 1992
- Reference no.: 600351
- Significant period: 1880s (fabric); 1880s–1910s, 1940s (historical)
- Significant components: cellar, garage, attic, views to, residential accommodation – main house, views from, service wing, lead light/s, stained glass window/s, strong room
- Builders: John William Young

Kirkston is a heritage-listed villa at 23 Rupert Street, Windsor, City of Brisbane, Queensland, Australia. It was designed by George Henry Male Addison and built from 1888 to 1889 by John William Young. It was added to the Queensland Heritage Register on 21 October 1992.

== History ==
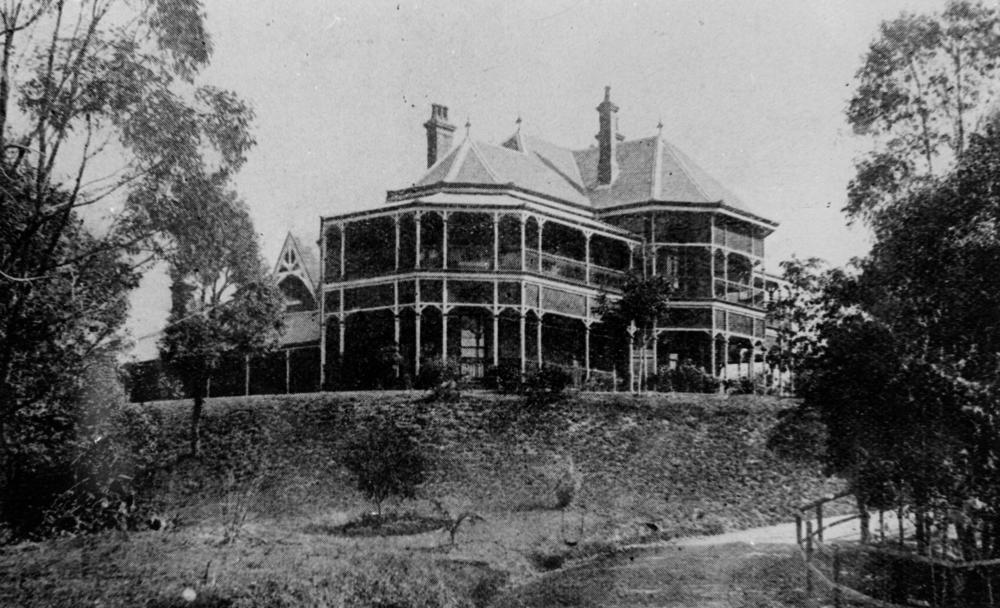
Kirkston, 1931

This substantial, two-storeyed brick residence was constructed in 1888–1889 for John Henry Flower, a Brisbane solicitor and co-founder of the legal firm of Flower & Hart, which remained prominent until multiple mergers from 2012 saw it become part of international firm K&L Gates.

Flower acquired the hilltop site of just over 7 acres (2.8 ha) in 1885. He commissioned respected Brisbane architect George Henry Male Addison (formerly of Melbourne) to design the hilltop home, and in 1888 raised a mortgage of £4,000 on the property.

Addison advertised for tenders in mid-1888, and a contract for £3,459 was let to Brisbane builder John William Young on 17 July. Young worked rapidly, employing an average of 50 to 70 men throughout the construction period. Foundations and cellar were commenced in early September and within four months the roof was being slated. By late April 1889 the elaborately decorated interior was sufficiently ready for furniture to be moved in (some had been specially built to complement interior finishes), and in June the Flower family took up residence.

The name of the house was derived from that of Flower's wife, Dora Kirk.

Although John Flower died c. 1918, the family remained at Kirkston for over 50 years. In the early 1930s the site was subdivided amongst Flower's heirs and the house was bequeathed to Rupert Wickham Flower.

Richard Henry Trotter purchased the house on just over 0.5 acres (0.20 ha) in 1941, and apart from three years during the early 1940s when it housed an American military intelligence unit, Kirkston has remained a family residence. One of the more flamboyant of recent owners was Paddy John Stephens of Paddys Markets fame at Teneriffe (1982–87).

In 1987 Prof Frank and Elizabeth Monsour purchased the property and spent nearly a decade restoring it back to its original beauty. The Monsour family have lived in the residence since as their home.

Kirkston remains a local landmark, with the early occupants commemorated by the local street names of Flower and Rupert.

== Description ==
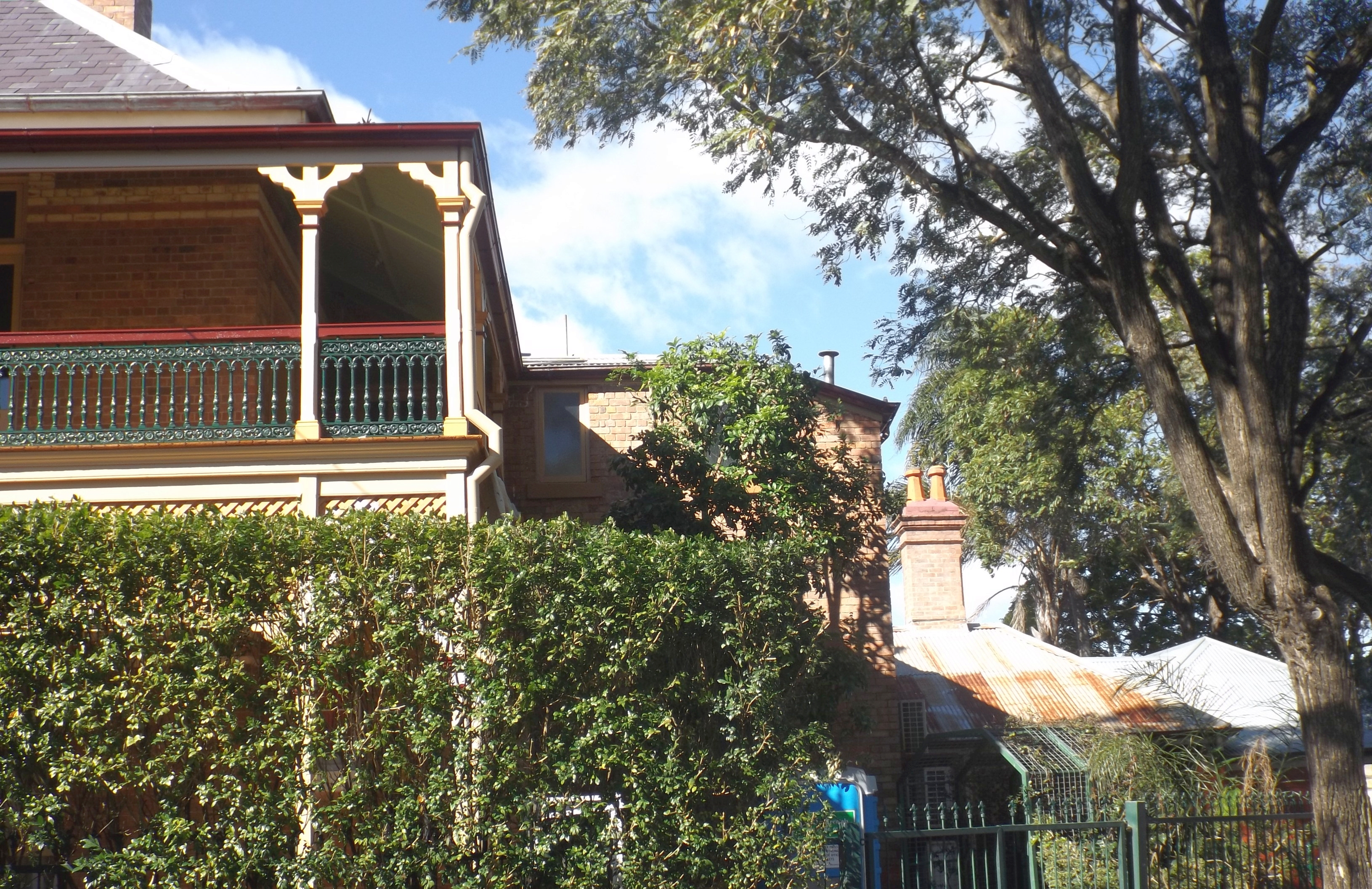
Side buildings, 2015

Kirkston is a large two-storeyed brick residence with an attached single-storeyed service wing. It occupies a prominent hilltop position, with the roof line visible from many parts of suburban Lutwyche-Windsor.

The core, which is capped by a complex slate-clad roof of steeply pitched hips and gables, accommodates a number of truncated wings in the design.

Foundations are of cement and the face work of Hendra brick is protected by a damp course.

Wide verandahs to three sides are supported by chamfered timber posts with capitals and brackets, and feature fine cast-iron balustrading and a deep lattice frieze.

Fire escapes have been added, and an early garage of lesser quality has been attached to the northeast wall.

The main house comprises entrance vestibule, stair hall, living and dining rooms, study, library, breakfast room (with cellar below), and strongroom on the ground floor, and six bedrooms and two bathrooms on the first floor. Extra kitchens and bathrooms have been added throughout the house since the original construction.

Distinguishing the interior is a lavish use of stained glass and timber, including English oak and walnut, Tasmanian blackwood and Queensland greasenut. Leadlighting in the ceiling above the stair hall and around the front door is of particular note, as are the timber dado panelling, fireplace surrounds and overmantels in the principal rooms, particularly those in the dining room. A skylight has been installed in the roof over the stair hall to illuminate the glass ceiling.

A half-screen in timber and glass divides the dining and living rooms, and the bay window opening to the southern verandah is separated from the main part of the living room by double arches supported by a slender central timber column. Several of the rooms retain the original wallpaper and friezes, those of the drawing room being especially ornate and intact.

The service extension also is of brick, but the design is Gothic with attic rooms. Two rooms were added to this wing early in the twentieth century.

Two huge weeping figs and the original gateposts remain at the corner of Flower and Palmer Streets. These are included within the heritage listing, although separated from the house by later subdivisions.

== Heritage listing ==
Kirkston was listed on the Queensland Heritage Register on 21 October 1992 having satisfied the following criteria.

The place is important in demonstrating the evolution or pattern of Queensland's history.

Kirkston, erected in 1888–1889, is significant as an ornate and substantially intact example of domestic architecture on the grand scale in Brisbane during the 1880s, with the opulence in form and finish reflecting the boom era mentality.

The place is important in demonstrating the principal characteristics of a particular class of cultural places.

It is a most accomplished building in design, features, finishes, materials, construction and setting, illustrating the principal characteristics of its type. Kirkston is important as a major early example of the domestic work of architect GHM Addison in Brisbane, the innovative design heralding subsequent Federation period building styles, and as evidence of the skill of builder John William Young.

The place is important because of its aesthetic significance.

The place is significant for its landmark quality and aesthetic contribution to the Windsor-Lutwyche townscape, and for its association with several of Brisbane's more prominent families and entrepreneurs.
