= Bellevue Hotel, Brisbane =

Demolished hotel in Brisbane, Queensland

Coordinates: 27.4747°S 153.0270°E

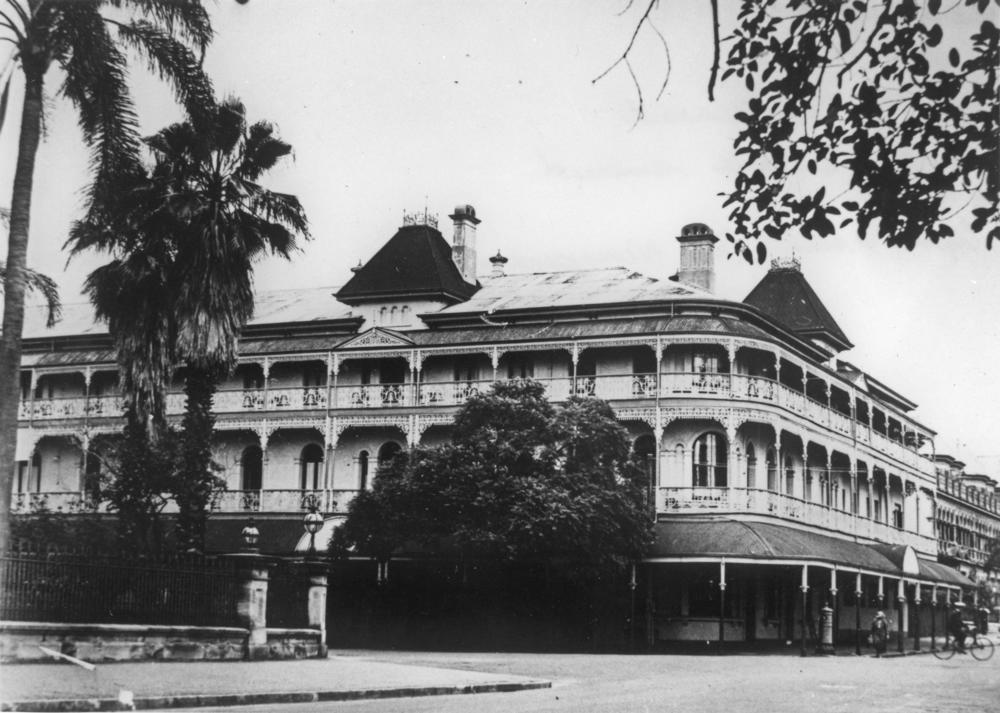
Bellevue Hotel, 1933

The Bellevue Hotel was a well-known pub and hotel on the western corner of George and Alice Streets, Brisbane, Queensland, Australia. Once Brisbane's premier hotel, it was demolished in 1979 despite considerable public objection. In 2009 as part of the Q150 celebrations, the demolition of the Bellevue Hotel was announced as one of the Q150 Icons of Queensland for its role as a "Defining Moment".

== History ==
The Bellevue Hotel was built in 1885–6, and served for many years as Brisbane's premier hotel. Being across the road from the Queensland Parliament House, it was used by many politicians. In 1967, the Queensland Government purchased the hotel with a view to demolishing it to create modern buildings for the Queensland Public Service, but there was considerable public objection, and the building stood abandoned for many years while its future was debated. In 1973, the Builders Labourers Federation placed a green ban on the site; despite this, the Queensland Government removed the verandas in 1974. At this time Joe Bonenti was the manager, and challenged this decision. Without any prior public announcement, the building was successfully demolished overnight on 20 April 1979 by the Deen Brothers, whose motto is "All we leave behind are the memories". The public outrage over the demolition eventually led to legislation to protect Queensland's heritage, enacted in 1992.
