= History of Queensland =

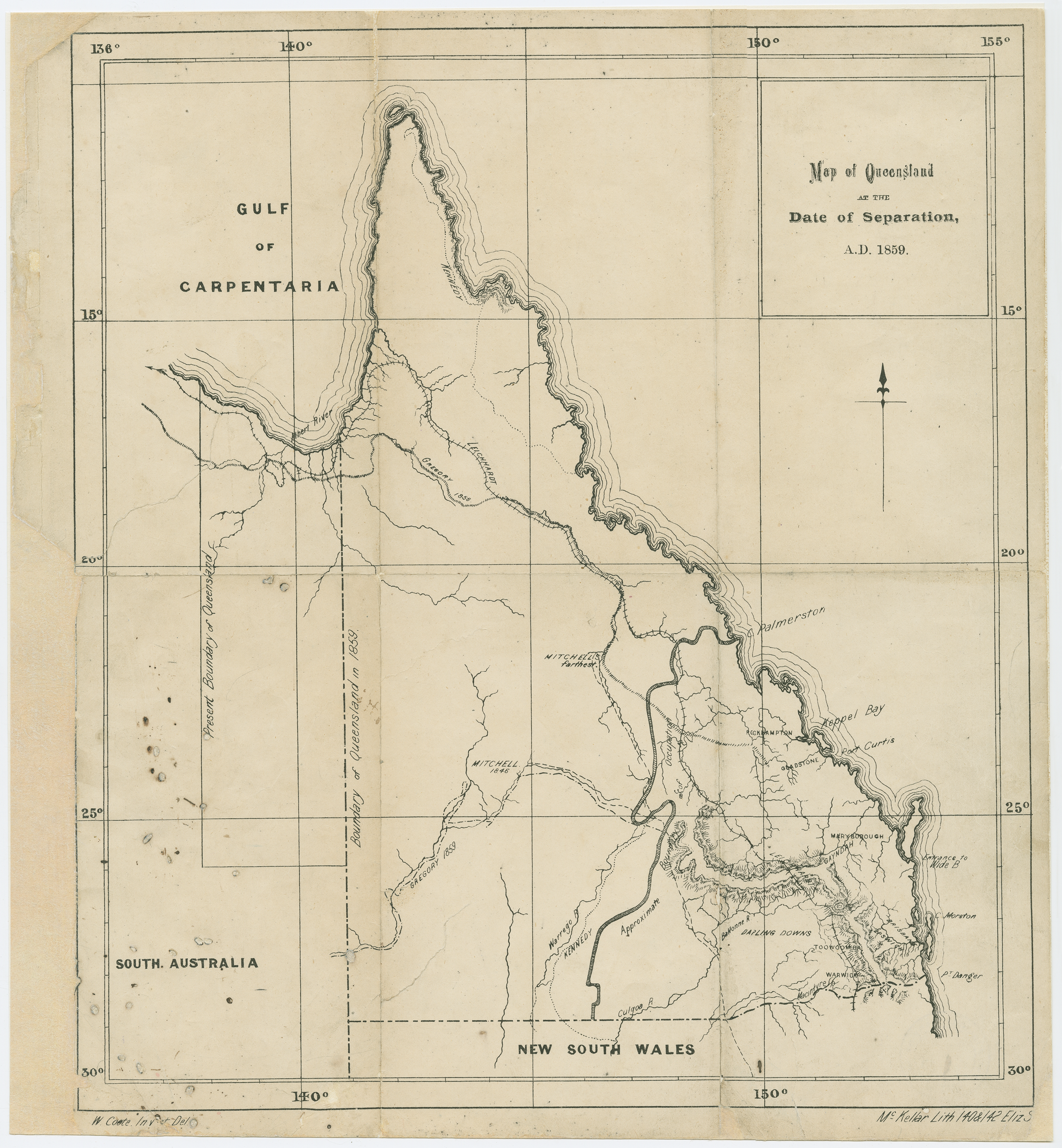
Map of Queensland upon separation from the Colony of New South Wales

The history of Queensland encompasses both a long Aboriginal Australian presence as well as the more recent periods of European colonisation and as a state of Australia. Before being charted and claimed for the Kingdom of Great Britain by Lieutenant James Cook in 1770, the coast of north-eastern Australia was explored by Dutch and French navigators. Queensland separated from the Colony of New South Wales as a self-governing Crown colony in 1859. In 1901 it became one of the six founding states of Australia.

== Indigenous people ==
Established theories estimate that between 50,000 and 60,000 years ago, humans first arrived in Australia – although some theories suggest this figure to be much higher. They are thought to have arrived either by boat or by land bridge. The most likely route was from Southeast Asia across the Torres Strait. During the initial ten thousand years, these people and their descendants are thought to have traveled over much of the continent.

Around 25,000 years ago, the ice age began with a rapid drop in the temperature of the Earth of eight degrees. Food was difficult to find and this led to the origin of seed-grinding technology. This climate change is estimated to have lasted for over 10,000 years. As the temperature rose, the land bridges from Southeast Asia to Tasmania were reclaimed by the sea.

About 15,000 years ago, global temperatures warmed and rainfall increased along the eastern coast of Australia. The inland of Queensland, also receiving rainfall, again became habitable. Coastal lands decreased due to rising sea levels and tropical rain forests spread. The Kalkadoon people of the inland central gulf region dug wells 10m deep to maintain their supply of freshwater.

From 10,000 years until European arrival, despite the favourable warmer climate, humans were unable to develop either agriculture or animal husbandry due to the lack of domesticable cereal plants or suitable animals. When James Cook explored and charted the east coast of Australia in 1770–1772 he was able to navigate close to shore in shallow water as HMB Endeavour was flat-bottomed, so he and the other scientists on board had plenty of time to examine the land through telescopes whilst depths were taken every few metres for the charts, but they reported they saw no evidence of either agriculture or permanent structures, which caused them to believe the people were nomads and therefore the land was "Terra Nullius" or without owners.

The peak Indigenous population in Queensland prior to European arrival is uncertain. The number may have been between 200,000 and 500,000 people. Numbers may have decreased at times of epidemics like smallpox. Rough calculations of the population can be made from the knowledge that Queensland supported 34.2 per cent of the total number of tribes in Australia and from the knowledge that 35 to 39 per cent of Australian indigenous people lived in Queensland. Queensland was the most densely populated region of the continent with two of the six to seven hundred Indigenous nations and at least ninety language groups.

== European exploration ==
In 1606, the Dutch navigator Willem Janszoon landed near the site of the modern-day town of Weipa on the western shore of Cape York. His arrival was the first recorded encounter between European and Australian Aboriginal people.

In 1606, Luis Váez de Torres, a Spanish explorer may have sighted the Queensland coast at the tip of Cape York. In that year, he had sailed the Torres Strait, the body of water now named after him.

In 1768, the French explorer Louis Antoine de Bougainville sailed west from the New Hebrides islands, getting to within a hundred miles of the Queensland coast. He did not reach the coast because he did not find a passage through the coral reefs, and turned back.

Lieutenant James Cook wrote that he claimed the east coast for King George III of the Kingdom of Great Britain on 22 August 1770 when standing on Possession Island off the west coast of Cape York Peninsula, naming eastern Australia "New South Wales". This included the present Queensland. Cook charted the Australian east coast in his ship HM Barque Endeavour, naming Stradbroke and Morton (now Moreton Island) islands, the Glass House Mountains, Double Island Point, Wide Bay, Hervey Bay and the Great Sandy Cape, now called Fraser Island. His second landfall in Australia was at Round Hill Head, 500 km (310 mi) north of Brisbane. Endeavour was grounded on a coral reef near Cape Tribulation, on 11 June 1770 where he was delayed for almost seven weeks while they repaired the ship. This occurred where Cooktown now lies, on the Endeavour River, both places named after the incident. On 22 August Endeavour reached the northern tip of Queensland, which Cook named the Cape York Peninsula after the Duke of York.

In 1799, in Norfolk, Matthew Flinders spent six weeks exploring the Queensland coast as far north as Hervey Bay. In 1802 he explored the coast again. On a later trip to England, his ship HMS Porpoise and the accompanying Cato ran aground on a coral reef off the Queensland coast. Flinders set off for Sydney in an open cutter, at a distance of 750 miles (1,210 km), where the Governor sent ships back to rescue the crew from Wreck Reef.

== 19th century exploration and settlement ==
In 1823, John Oxley sailed north from Sydney to inspect Port Curtis (now Gladstone) and Moreton Bay as possible sites for a penal colony. At Moreton Bay, he found the Brisbane River whose existence Cook had predicted and proceeded to explore the lower part of it. In September 1824, he returned with soldiers and established a temporary settlement at Redcliffe. On 2 December, the Moreton Bay penal settlement was transferred to where the Central Business District (CBD) of Brisbane now stands. The settlement was initially called Edenglassie, a portmanteau of the Scottish towns Edinburgh and Glasgow. Major Edmund Lockyer discovered outcrops of coal along the banks of the upper Brisbane River in 1825. In 1839, transportation of convicts ceased, culminating in the closure of the Brisbane penal settlement. In 1842, a free settlement was permitted. In the same year, Andrew Petrie reported favourable grazing conditions and decent forests to the north of Brisbane, which led shortly to the arrival of settlers to Fraser Island and the Cooloola coast region.

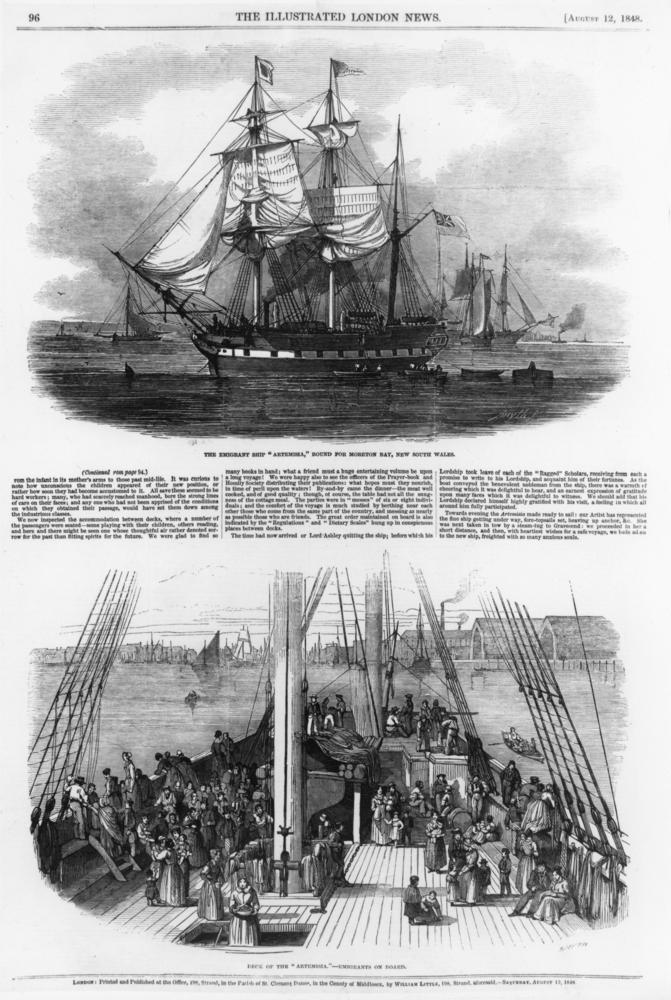
Immigrants aboard the Artemisia arrived at the colony of Moreton Bay in 1848.

In 1847, the Port of Maryborough was opened as a wool port. The first immigrant ship to arrive in Moreton Bay was the Artemisia in 1848. In 1857, Queensland's first lighthouse was built at Cape Moreton.

=== Frontier war ===
Fighting between Aboriginals and settlers in colonial Queensland was more bloody than in any other colonial state in Australia, perhaps partly due to Queensland having a larger pre-contact indigenous population than any other colony in Australia, accounting for over one third, and in some estimates close to forty percent, of the entire pre-contact population of the continent. The latest and hitherto most comprehensive survey estimates that some 1,500 European settlers – and their Chinese, Aboriginal and Melanesian allies – died in frontier skirmishes with Aboriginals in Queensland during the nineteenth century. The same study indicates that the number of casualties Aboriginal people suffered in these battles with settlers and native police (frequently described by contemporary political leaders and newspapers as "warfare", "a kind of warfare", "guerrilla-like warfare", and at times as a "war of extermination") is highly likely to have exceeded 30,000. (That is a tripling of the hitherto used minimum estimates for Queensland.) Yet even this figure is liable to increase if the results of the first attempt to use extensive primary sources to calculate the Aboriginal casualties due to violence on the Queensland frontier in this period is used. A paper prepared by Raymond Evans and Robert Ørsted-Jensen for the annual AHA conference at the University of Queensland on 9 July 2014 indicated that a minimum figure of 65,000 Aboriginal casualties is a more realistic figure. The "Native Police Force" (sometimes "Native Mounted Police Force"), recruited and deployed by the Queensland government, was allegedly involved in the oppression, dispossession and murder of indigenous people during this period.

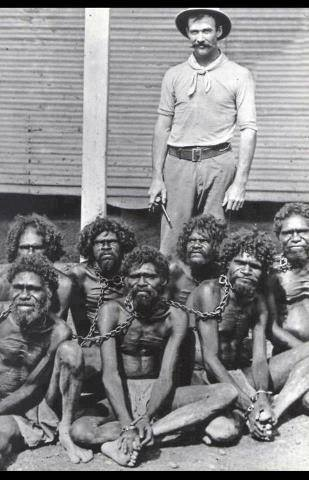
Captured Aboriginal tribesmen as prisoners

The three largest massacres of whites by Aboriginals in Australian colonial history all took place in Queensland. On 27 October 1857 Martha Fraser's Hornet Bank station on the Dawson River, in central Queensland took the lives of 11 Europeans. The tent camp of the embryo station of Cullin-La-Ringo near Springsure was attacked by Aboriginals on 17 October 1861, killing 19 people including the grazier Horatio Wills. Following the wreck of the brig Maria at Bramble Reef near the Whitsunday Islands, on 26 February 1872, a total of 14 European survivors were massacred by local Aboriginals. The Battle of One Tree Hill and Darkey Flat Massacre also took place in the 1840s.

=== Separation from New South Wales ===
Colony of Queensland
- British Crown Colony
- 1859–1901
- Flag (1876–1901)

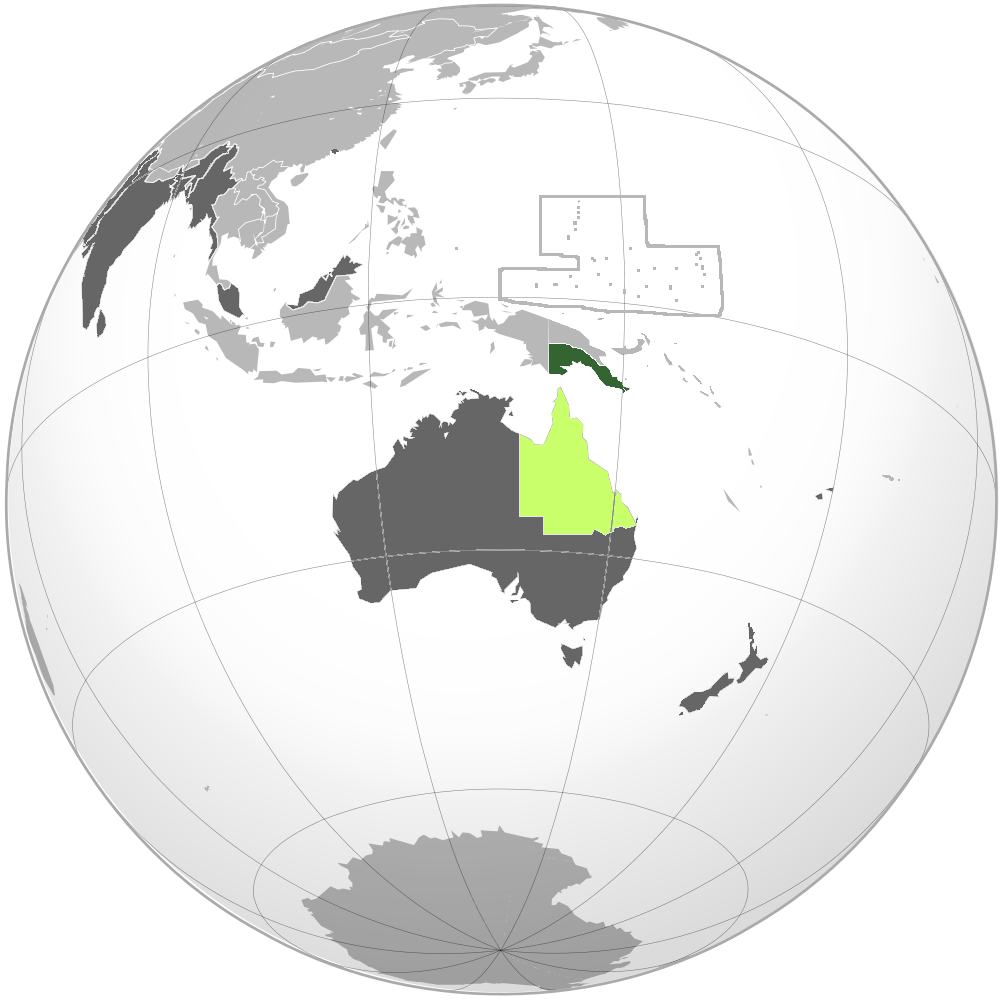
- Light green: Queensland Green: Territory of Papua (annexed by Queensland in 1883) Dark grey: other British possessions
- Government
  - Type: Self-governing colony
- Monarch
  - 1859–1901: Victoria
- Governor
  - 1859–1868: George Bowen first
  - 1896–1901: Charles Cochrane-Baillie, 2nd Baron Lamington last
- Legislature: Parliament of Queensland
- History
  - Separation from New South Wales, Responsible government: 6 June 1859
  - Federation of Australia: 1901
Preceded by	Succeeded by
Colony of New South Wales	Australia; Queensland

In 1851, a public meeting was held to consider Queensland's separation from New South Wales. On 6 June 1859 Queen Victoria signed letters patent to form the Colony of Queensland. A proclamation was read by George Bowen on 10 December 1859 whereupon Queensland was formally separated from New South Wales. Bowen became the first Governor of Queensland and Robert Herbert became the first Premier of Queensland. The young colony was keen to fill its treasury. Seeing the gold rushes and their effects in Victoria and New South Wales, the government of Queensland offered significant rewards to anyone discovering payable gold deposits.

Queensland was the only Australian colony that commenced immediately with its own parliament (responsible government), instead of first spending time with a governor appointed by The Crown. By this time, Western Australia was the only Australian colony without a responsible government. Ipswich and Rockhampton became towns in 1860, with Maryborough and Warwick becoming towns the following year.

In 1861, rescue parties for Burke and Wills, which failed to find them, did some exploratory work of their own, in central and north-western Queensland. Notably among these was Frederick Walker who originally worked for the native police. Brisbane was linked by electric telegraph to Sydney in 1861, however, the first operating telegraph line in Queensland was from Brisbane to Ipswich in the same year.

==== Gold rush ====
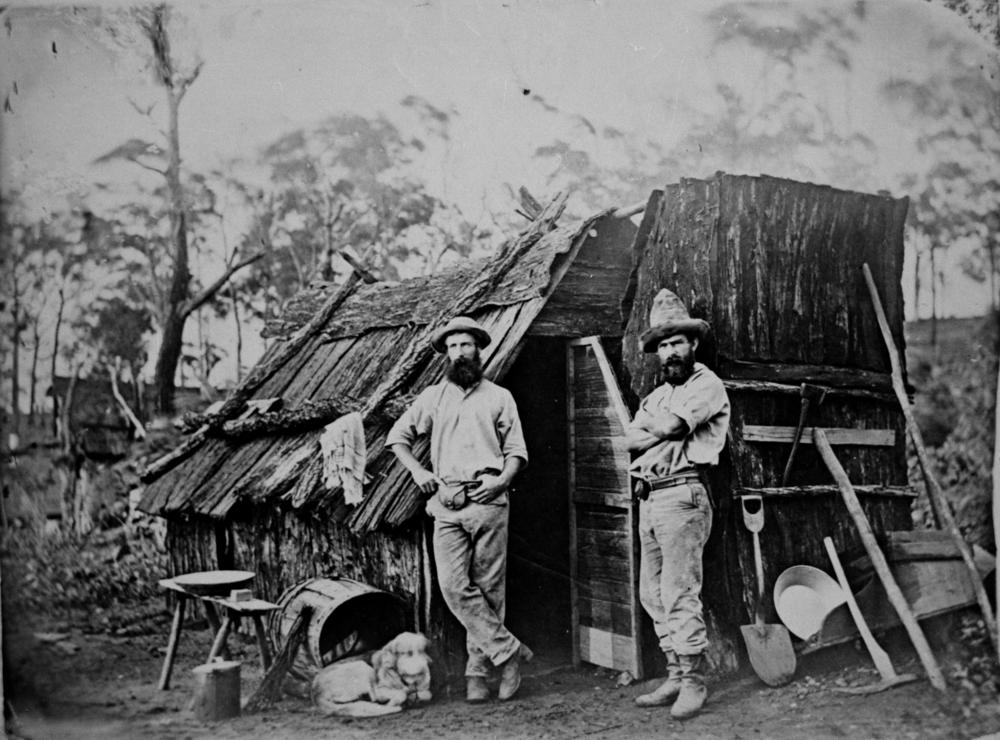
Early gold miners were prepared to live rough in order to strike it rich.

Although smaller than the gold rushes of Victoria and New South Wales, Queensland had its own series of gold rushes in the later half of the nineteenth century. In 1858, gold was discovered at Canoona, creating the short-lived Canoona gold rush. In 1867, gold was discovered in Gympie. James Nash's find was invaluable to the nascent Queensland colony, saving it from bankruptcy. Richard Daintree's explorations in North Queensland led to several goldfields being developed in the late 1860s. In 1872, William Hann discovered gold on the Palmer River, southwest of Cooktown. Chinese settlers began to arrive in the goldfields, by 1877 there were 17,000 Chinese in Queensland gold fields. In that year, restrictions on Chinese immigration were passed.

=== Late 19th century ===
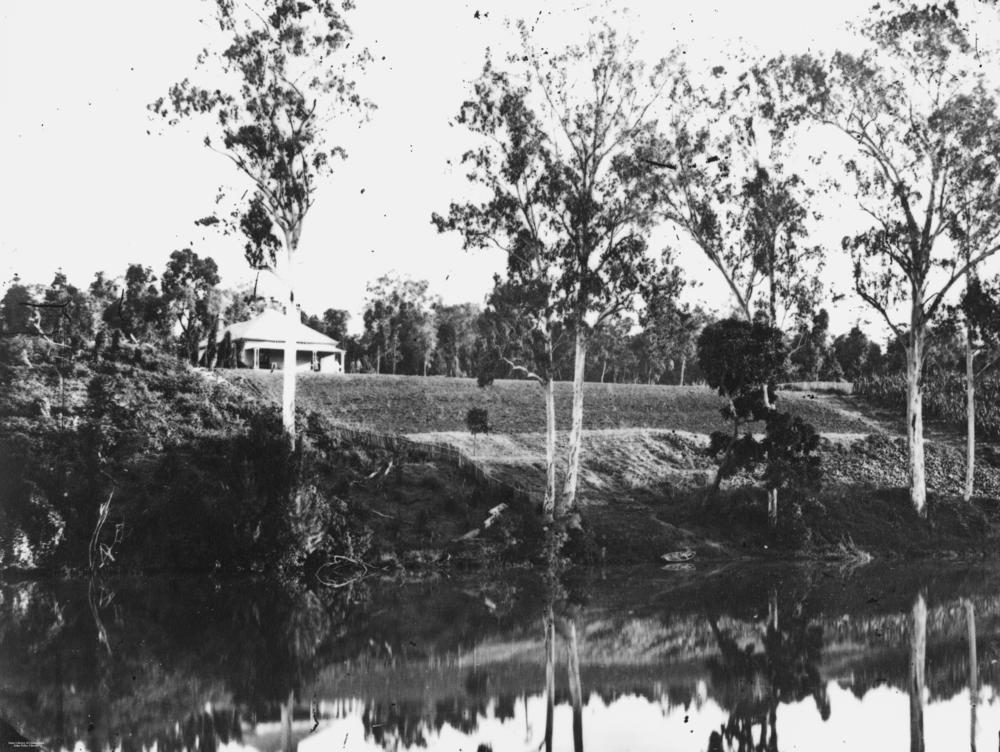
Mary River residence, ~1870

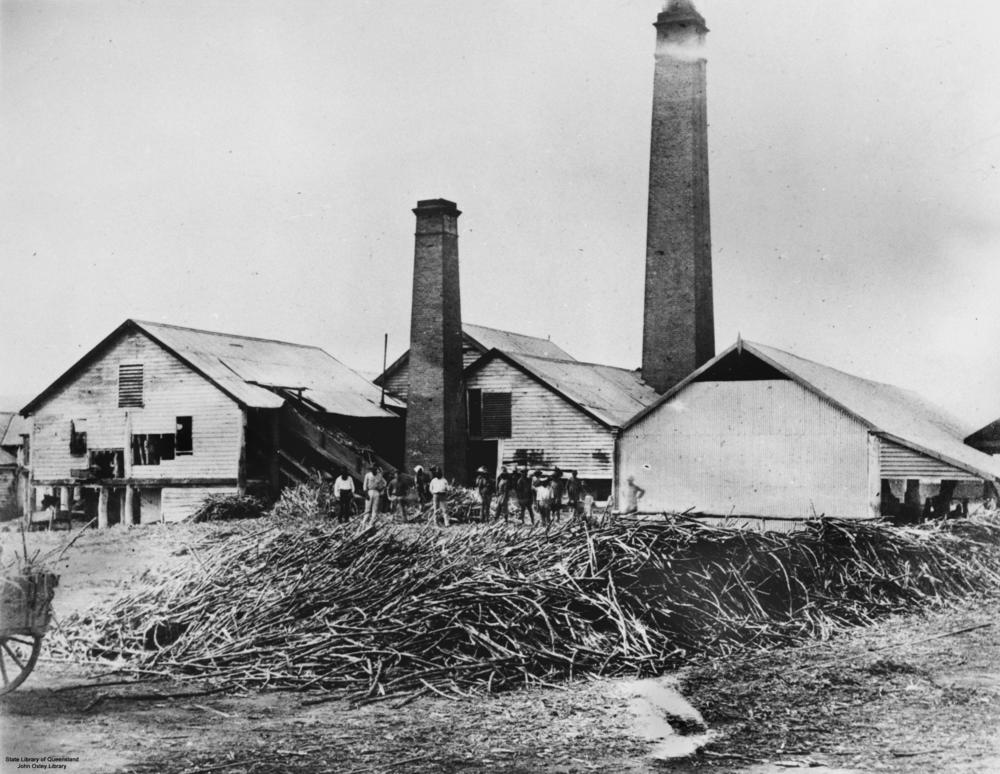
Pioneer Sugar Mill at Mackay in the 1880s.

Queensland's western boundary was changed from longitude 141° E to 138°E in 1862.

In 1863, the first Chief Justice, Sir James Cockle was appointed.

On 25 November 1863, the Presbyterian Church of Queensland was officially established.

1864 was a bad year for Brisbane. In March of that year, major flooding of the Brisbane River inundated the centre of town, in April, fires devastated the west side of Queen Street, which was the main shopping district and in December, another fire, which was Brisbane's worst ever, wiped out the rest of Queen Street and adjoining streets.

1865 saw the first steam trains in Queensland, travelling (from Ipswich to Bigge's Camp, which is now known as Grandchester). Townsville was gazetted as a town in the same year. In 1867, the Constitution of Queensland was consolidated from existing legislation under the Constitution Act 1867. Sugar production was by then becoming a major industry. In 1867, six mills produced 168 tons of cane sugar, by 1870 there were 28 mills with a production of 2,854 tons. The production of sugar started around Brisbane but spread to Mackay and Cairns, and by 1888 the annual output of sugar was 60,000 tons. 1871 saw George Phipps, 2nd Marquess of Normanby become the Governor of Queensland.

In 1877, Arthur Edward Kennedy became the Governor of Queensland. The first meat processed in the state occurred at Queensport along the Brisbane River in 1881.

On 2 June 1883, the decision to form a rugby union association was made at the Exchange hotel in Brisbane.

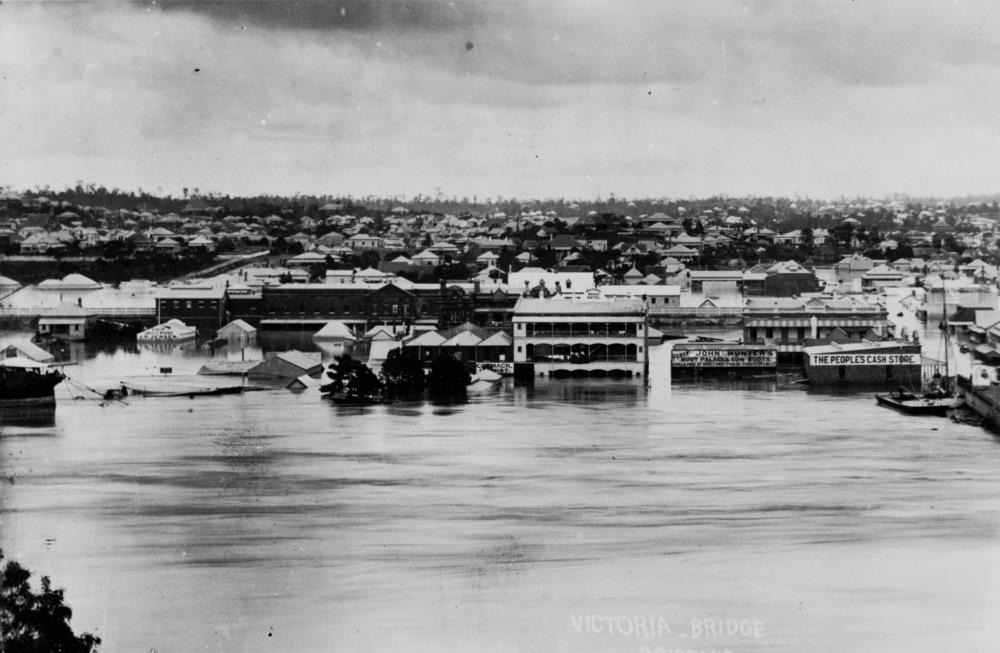
South Brisbane during the 1893 Brisbane flood

The land where the Brisbane Cricket Ground now sits was first used as a cricket ground in 1895, with the first cricket match played there in December 1896.

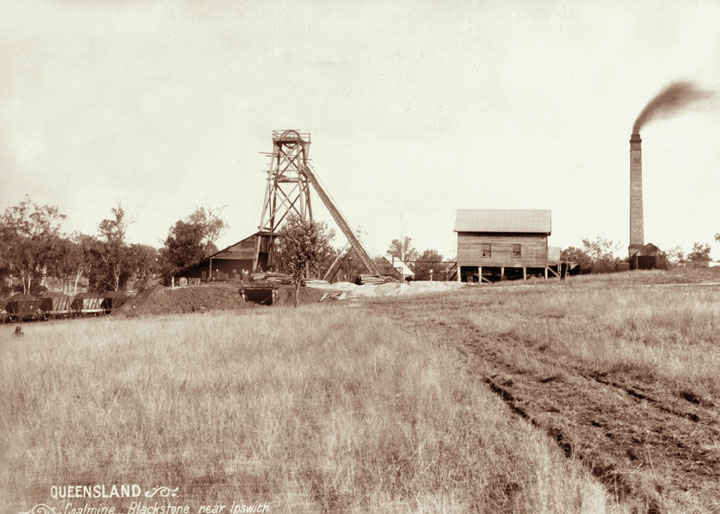
Coal mine in Ipswich, 1898

In 1897, Queensland passed legislation to appoint the first Chief Protector of Aboriginals in the state.

In July 1899 Queensland offered to send a force of 250 mounted infantry to help Britain in the Second Boer War (Second Anglo-Boer War). Also in that year, gold production at Charters Towers peaked.

The first natural gas find in Queensland and Australia was at Roma in 1900 as a team was drilling a water well.

=== Indentured labourers from the Pacific Islands ===
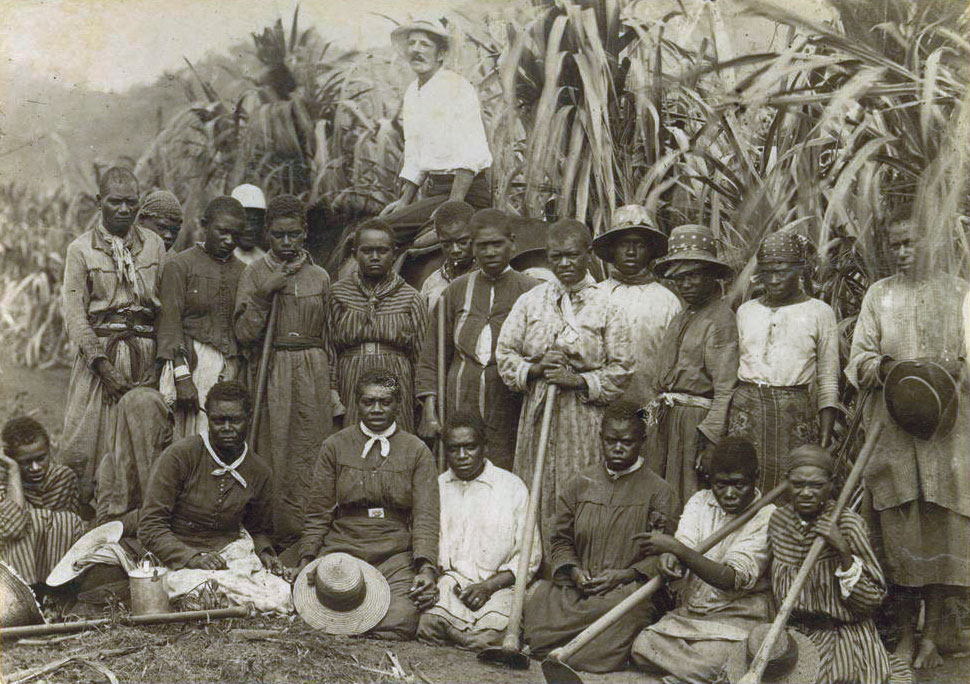
"Blackbirding" coerced or kidnapped tens of thousands of South Sea Islanders into indentured servitude or slavery on Queensland's cotton and sugar plantations.

During the 1890s many workers known as the Kanakas were brought to Queensland from neighbouring Pacific Island nations to work in the sugar cane fields. Some of whom had been kidnapped or coerced under a process known as blackbirding. When Australia was federated in 1901, the White Australia policy came into effect, whereby all foreign workers in Australia were deported under the Pacific Island Labourers Act 1901.

== 20th century ==
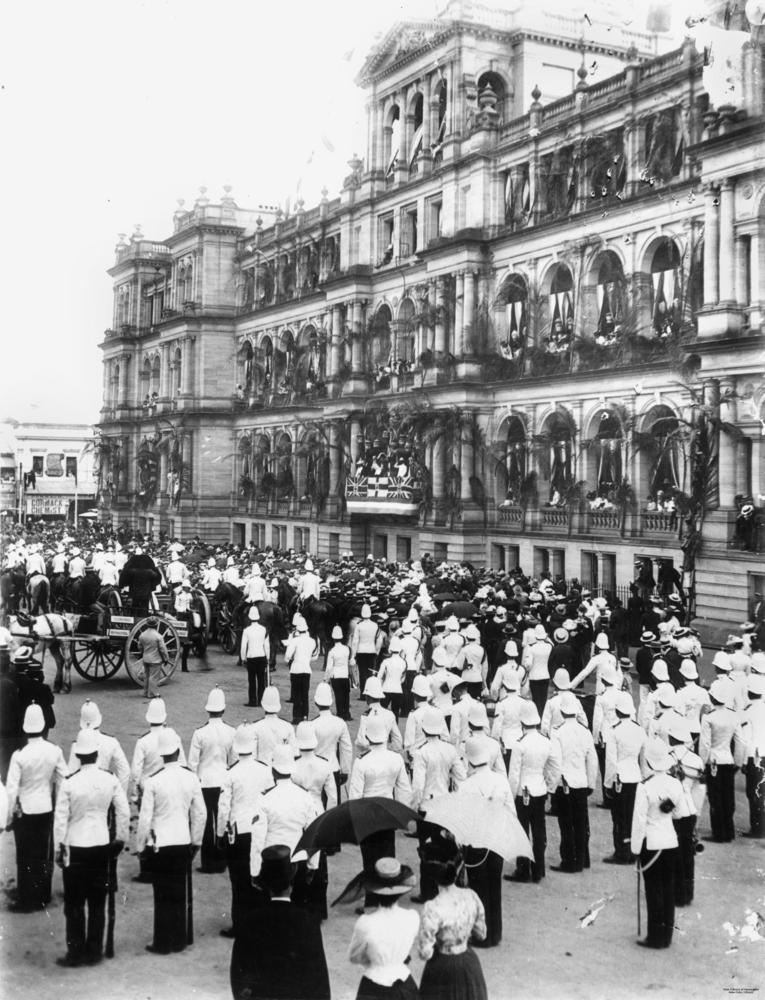
Lord Lamington addresses Federation Day crowds, Brisbane, 1901

=== Federation to First World War ===
April 1900 saw the bubonic plague enter Queensland at Rockhampton, where it persisted until 1909.

On 1 January 1901, following a series of referendums, the six Australian colonies including Queensland federated to form Australia as a nation. Certain powers previously exercised by the Queensland Government were ceded to the federal government under the Constitution of Australia.

Federation was a considerable economic shock to Queensland, which had the most restrictive tariff policy on the eve of the formation of Commonwealth customs union. Free trade with other states led to an influx of manufactured imports from New South Wales and Victoria, resulting in a contraction of employment within Queensland's less competitive manufacturing sector.

The Trackson was an Australian automobile built in Brisbane. In 1901, the Chillagoe smelters commenced operations.

In 1905, women voted in state elections for the first time.

In 1908, Witches Falls, now part of Tamborine National Park on Tamborine Mountain is declared the first national park in Queensland.

The University of Queensland was established in 1909 with teaching commencing in 1911.

The 1912 Brisbane General Strike lasted for five weeks.

=== World War I ===
The United Kingdom declared war against Germany on 4 August 1914. As Australia's new constitution was silent on the declaration of war, on 20 August 1914 Queensland made an independent proclamation of war between His Majesty the King (George V) and the German Emperor (Wilhelm II). Later Queensland made further independent proclamations of war against Austria and Hungary, Bulgaria and Turkey. Initially in 1914 the war in Europe did not impact greatly on life in Queensland, although the existing militia was deployed in the Australian Naval and Military Expeditionary Force attack on German New Guinea.

The outbreak of war created a heightened sense of patriotism; the call for Queenslanders to volunteer for the Australian Imperial Force met its initial quota of 2500 men by September 1914. With so many willing to enlist, the army could insist on a high standard of physical fitness. However, the only women accepted by the army were single women nurses. Women doctors were not accepted by the army, arguing they could not stand the conditions (despite nurses enduring the same conditions) and, perhaps more tellingly, that male doctors would be unwilling to work with them. This led to a number of Queensland women finding unofficial ways to serve the war effort, e.g. Lilian Violet Cooper, Queensland's first female doctor served in the Scottish Women's Hospitals serving in Serbia while her companion Josephine Bedford also served in the Scottish Women's Hospitals as an ambulance driver in Serbia. Eleanor Bourne, another Queensland doctor, travelled to England to enlist as a medical officer in the Royal Army Medical Corps and later served in the Queen Mary's Army Auxiliary Corps. Visiting London during the outbreak of the war, Annie Wheeler, a married nurse, remained in London and, with the assistance of her daughter Portia, became a volunteer worker for the comfort of Central Queensland soldiers, maintaining a comprehensive card index through which she ensured the soldiers and their families were kept well-informed and supported through practical and financial assistance. Eleanor Bourne. There was also a heightened suspicion of Germans with any known German military reservists being immediately arrested and detained.

In Queensland on 10 January 1916, Canon David John Garland was appointed the honorary secretary of the Anzac Day Commemoration Committee of Queensland (ADCCQ) at a public meeting which endorsed 25 April as the date promoted as "Anzac Day" in 1916 and ever after. Devoted to the cause of a non-denominational commemoration that could be attended by the whole of Australian society, Garland worked amicably across all denominational divides, creating the framework for Anzac Day commemorative services. Garland is specifically credited with initiating the Anzac Day march, the wreath-laying ceremonies at memorials and the special church services, the two minutes silence, and the luncheon for returned soldiers. Garland intended the silence to be used in lieu of prayer to allow the Anzac Day service to be universally attended, allowing attendees to make a silent prayer or remembrance in accordance with their own beliefs. He particularly feared that the universality of the ceremony would fall victim to religious sectarian disputes.

Over 58,000 Queenslanders fought in World War I and over 10,000 of them died.

The state's largest recorded earthquake struck in 1918 near Rockhampton with a magnitude of six.

=== Between the Wars ===
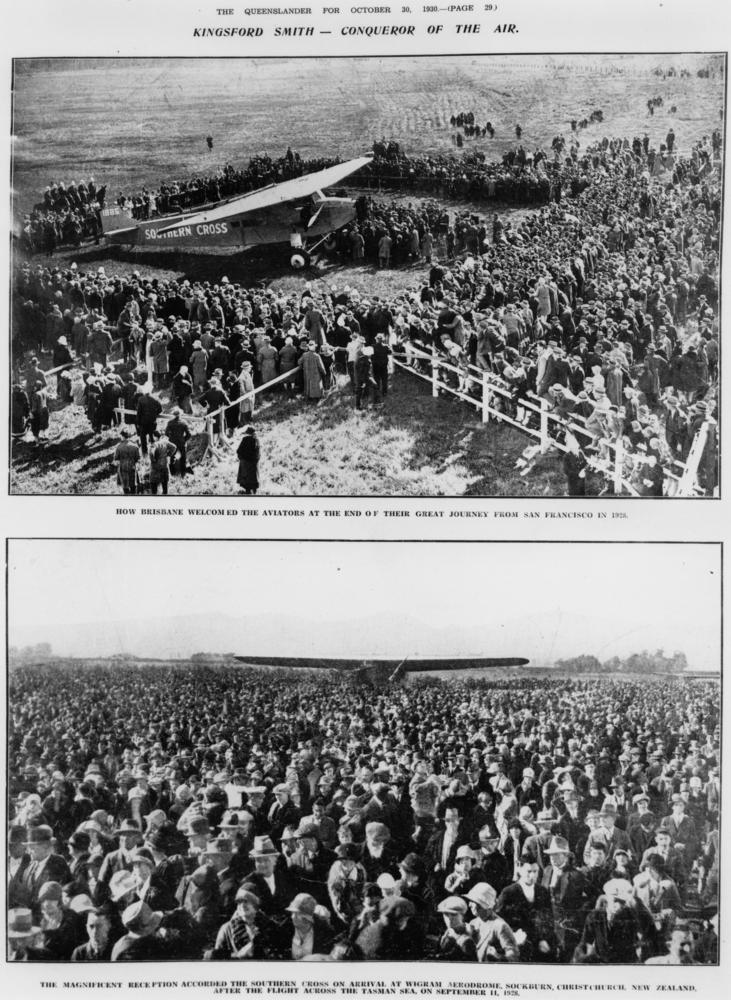
Crowds support Charles Kingsford Smith record breaking flights at Brisbane and Christchurch in 1928

In 1919 the "Spanish flu" arrived in Queensland. From January to May 1919 the Queensland Government closed the border between Queensland and New South Wales to try to prevent the spread of the disease. The Queensland Commissioner for Public Health was empowered to examine, detain or isolate anyone with the disease or believed to have been in contact with a sick person. The Queensland Police were authorised to apprehend people or take other actions to prevent breaches of public health laws. Initially, the only border crossings allowed (and supervised by the Queensland Police) were Coolangatta, Wallangarra and Goondiwindi, but faced with public pressure, the Queensland Government extended border crossing points to include Wompah, Hungerford, Wooroorooka, Adelaide Gate and Mungindi. Mungindi was to become a popular target for "border breakers". Despite not being official entry points, the police were required to actively prevent crossings at border locations such as Killarney, Stanthorpe, Texas and Hebel. A number of police officers died from infections acquired in protecting the border. In May 1919 the restrictions on border crossings were removed as it was apparent that the virus was well established in Queensland and police administering the border crossings were returned to their normal duties.

Qantas was founded in 1920 to serve outback Queensland. 1920 saw Matthew Nathan become Governor and actively promotes British migration to Queensland. The Mount Mulligan mine disaster killed 75 workers in 1921. In 1922, the Queensland Legislative Council was abolished, making Queensland the only Australian state (to this day) without a bicameral legislature. On 9 June 1925, the Traverston rail disaster occurs – the worst rail disaster in Queensland's history until 1947. In 1927, the Duke and Duchess of York toured Queensland. They were here to open Parliament House in Canberra but spent time in southern Queensland to meet and greet people. In 1928, the Royal Flying Doctor Service of Australia makes the first flight, departing from Cloncurry. Also, in 1928, Sir Charles Kingsford Smith landed the Southern Cross in Brisbane, completing the first trans-Pacific flight. In 1935, 101 cane toads were brought into Queensland to try to control pests on sugar cane crops and bred to 3,000, which were released into areas around Cairns, Innisfail and Gordonvale. They have since spread to many parts of Queensland, New South Wales and the Northern Territory. In late 1936 a lightning strike hit the Bundaberg Rum Distillery, destroying the distillery without any loss of life. It was rebuilt and is currently operating on the same site today.

The state's first national park ranger, Mick O'Reily was temporarily appointed between 1919 and 1923.

=== Second World War ===
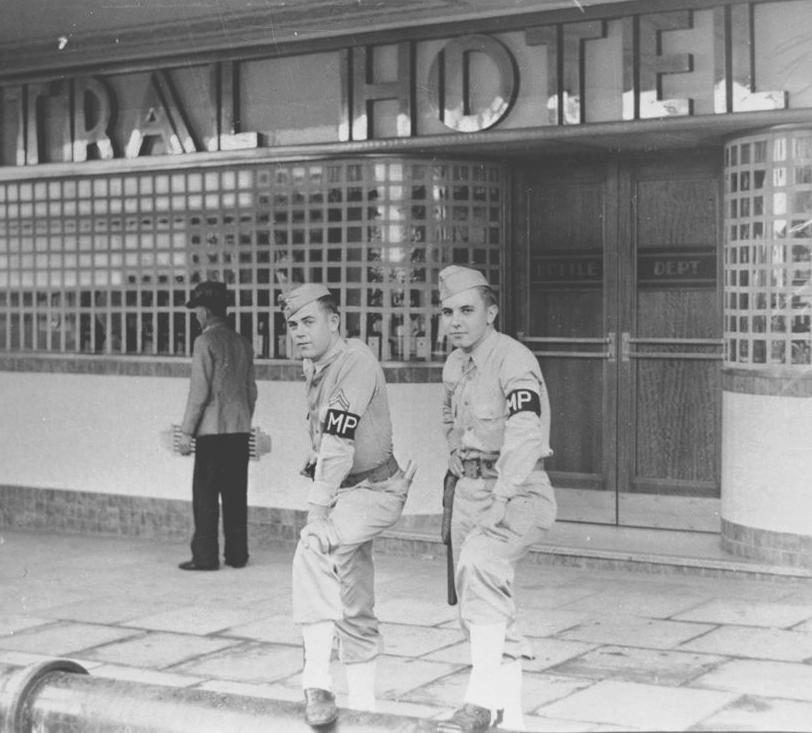
April 1942. US military police outside the Central Hotel, Brisbane. Later that year there was violence between Australians and US MPs in the Battle of Brisbane. The pipe on which they are resting their feet carried sea water, for use in fighting fires in the event of air raids.

During World War II, many Queenslanders volunteered for the Australian Imperial Force, the Royal Australian Air Force and the Royal Australian Navy.

Following the outbreak of war with Japan, Queensland soon became a virtual frontline, as fears of invasion grew. Several cities and places in Northern Queensland were bombed by the Japanese during their air attacks on Australia. These included Horn Island, Townsville and Mossman.

There was a massive buildup of Australian and United States forces in the state, and the Allied Supreme Commander in the South West Pacific Area, General Douglas MacArthur, established his headquarters in Brisbane. Facilities were assigned or constructed to accommodate and train these forces such as Camp Cable south of Brisbane. Tens of thousands of Queenslanders were conscripted into Militia (reserve) units.

On 14 May 1943, the Australian Hospital Ship Centaur was sunk off North Stradbroke Island, by a torpedo from a Japanese Navy submarine. Later in the war, the 3rd Division, a Militia unit made of predominantly Queensland personnel, took part in the Bougainville campaign.

=== Post war ===
The 1948 Queensland Railway strike was a nine-week strike over the wages of railway workshop and depot workers. In 1952, Queensland's only whaling station opens at Tangalooma and closed a decade later. A cyclone crossed the coast over Coolangatta on 20 February 1954 causing significant damage.

The Shearers' strike of 1956 saw Queensland shearers off work between January and October in a dispute over wages. Henry Abel Smith becomes Governor in 1958. In 1962, the first commercial production of oil in Queensland and Australia began at Moonie. The first long-distance oil pipeline in Australia carried the oil 191 miles (307 km) to the newly constructed Lytton Oil Refinery near the mouth of the Brisbane River. A program of drum lines to reduce shark attacks at beaches also began in 1962. 1968 saw Sir Joh Bjelke-Petersen elected as Premier. He remained in that role for 19 years. In 1969, the first natural gas pipeline in Queensland and Australia, connecting the Roma gasfields to Brisbane, became operational.

1971 saw escalating protests in regard to the 1971 South Africa rugby union tour of Australia and Bjelke-Petersen declare a state of emergency in the state In the same year Daylight Saving is introduced to Queensland. Only to be abandoned the following year. The Box Flat Mine explosion took the lives of 18 men in 1972. Two years later the 1974 Brisbane flood caused widespread damage. In 1976, sand mining on Fraser Island is halted.

=== 1980s ===
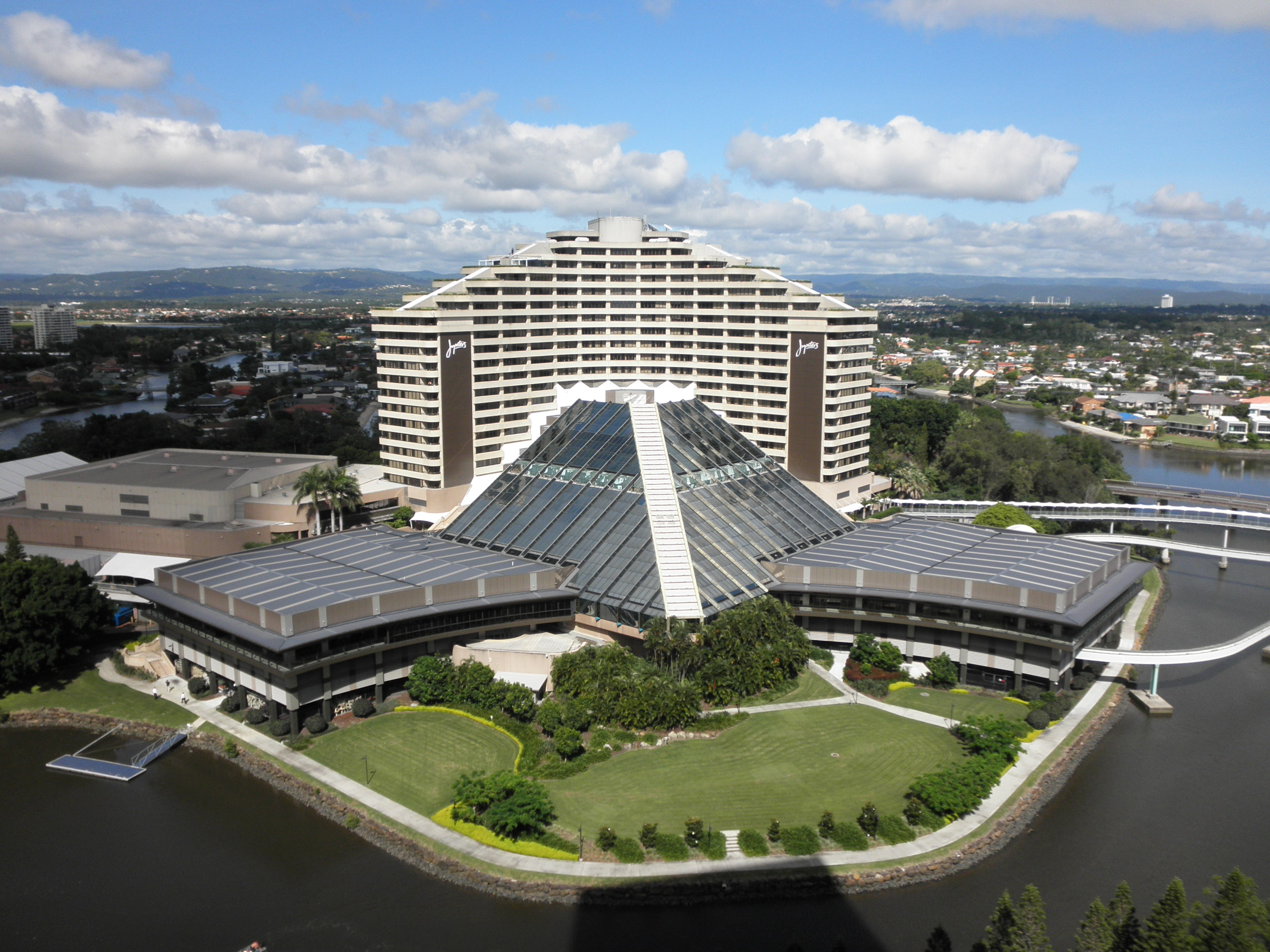
The Jupiters Hotel and Casino opened in 1985

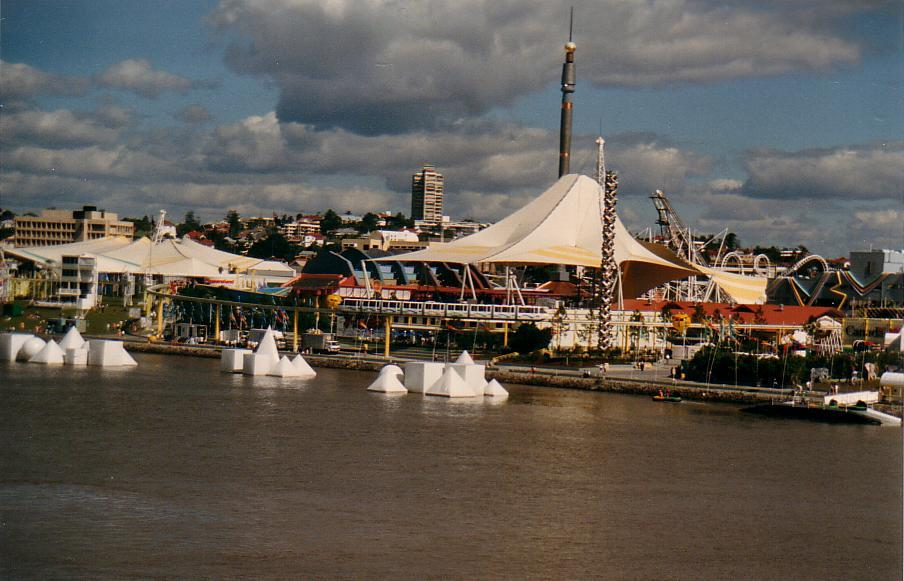
World Expo 88

1982 saw Brisbane host the Commonwealth Games. In the same year, Eddie Mabo began action in the High Court to claim ownership of land in the Torres Strait on behalf of the indigenous inhabitants, following the Queensland Amendment Act, which was passed that year. In 1985, the Queensland government tried to end proceedings in the High Court by passing the Queensland Coast Islands Declaratory Act 1985, which claimed that Queensland had total control of the Torres Strait Islands after they had been annexed in 1879. This act was held as contrary to the Racial Discrimination Act 1975 by the High Court in 1988. The well-known Mabo v Queensland (No 2) (1992) decision was handed down in 1992, which recognised the native title.

In 1987 in response to a series of articles on high-level police corruption in The Courier-Mail by reporter Phil Dickie, followed by a Four Corners television report, aired on 11 May 1987, entitled "The Moonlight State" with reporter Chris Masters the Fitzgerald Inquiry (1987–1989), presided over by Tony Fitzgerald QC, resulted in the deposition of a premier, two by-elections, the jailing of three former ministers and a police commissioner being jailed and losing his knighthood. Wayne Goss led the Labor Government to power in 1989. In 1980, the annual State of Origin series began at Lang Park in Brisbane. Two years later the Commonwealth Games was held in Brisbane.

In May 1987, the Fitzgerald Inquiry (1987–1989) into Queensland Police corruption was ordered by Deputy Premier Bill Gunn. On 1 December 1987, Sir Joh Bjelke-Petersen was forced to resign as Premier of Queensland. His resignation is accepted by Governor Walter Campbell. In 1987, the Brisbane Bears Australian rules football team joined the VFL as the second team outside Victoria. It was merged with Fitzroy to become the Brisbane Lions in 1997. 1987 saw Brisbane host games of the first ever Rugby World Cup.

Expo '88 was held in Brisbane in 1988 to celebrate the Bicentenary of the First fleet founding the colony of Australia. The event was very successful and helped promote Brisbane and Queensland on the world stage. Also that year, the Brisbane Broncos and Gold Coast-Tweed Giants rugby league teams were founded, followed by the South Queensland Crushers and North Queensland Cowboys in 1995. In 1989, Queensland commenced a three-year trial of Daylight Saving. On 2 December 1989, the National Party government of Russell Cooper was defeated at the state election. The government of Labor Premier Wayne Goss commenced on 7 December 1989.

=== 1990s ===
The 1990s saw Queensland undergo rapid population growth, largely as the result of interstate migration. Internal migrants were attracted to Queensland's buoyant economy, and the opportunity for young families to more easily purchase homes than market conditions would allow in Sydney. Queensland's population growth during the 1990s was largely concentrated in South East Queensland. In 1991, logging on Fraser Island ceases.

In October 1990, homosexuality was decriminalised in Queensland, the second last state to do so.

By the late 1990s, Queensland's rapid population growth was placing pressure on South East Queensland's infrastructure, including within Brisbane. Major planning of road, rail, electricity and water infrastructure was undertaken to cope with the growing population, with many of these projects being built during the following decade.

In 1992, Queensland held a referendum on Daylight Saving, which was defeated with a 54.5% "no" vote. In 1998, the use of the Brisbane and Bremer Rivers for the barging of coal ceases after 158 years.

The first nature refuge established under Queensland's Nature Conservation Act 1992 was declared for "Berlin Scrub", a forty-one-hectare site in the Lockyer Valley in 1994.

== 21st century ==
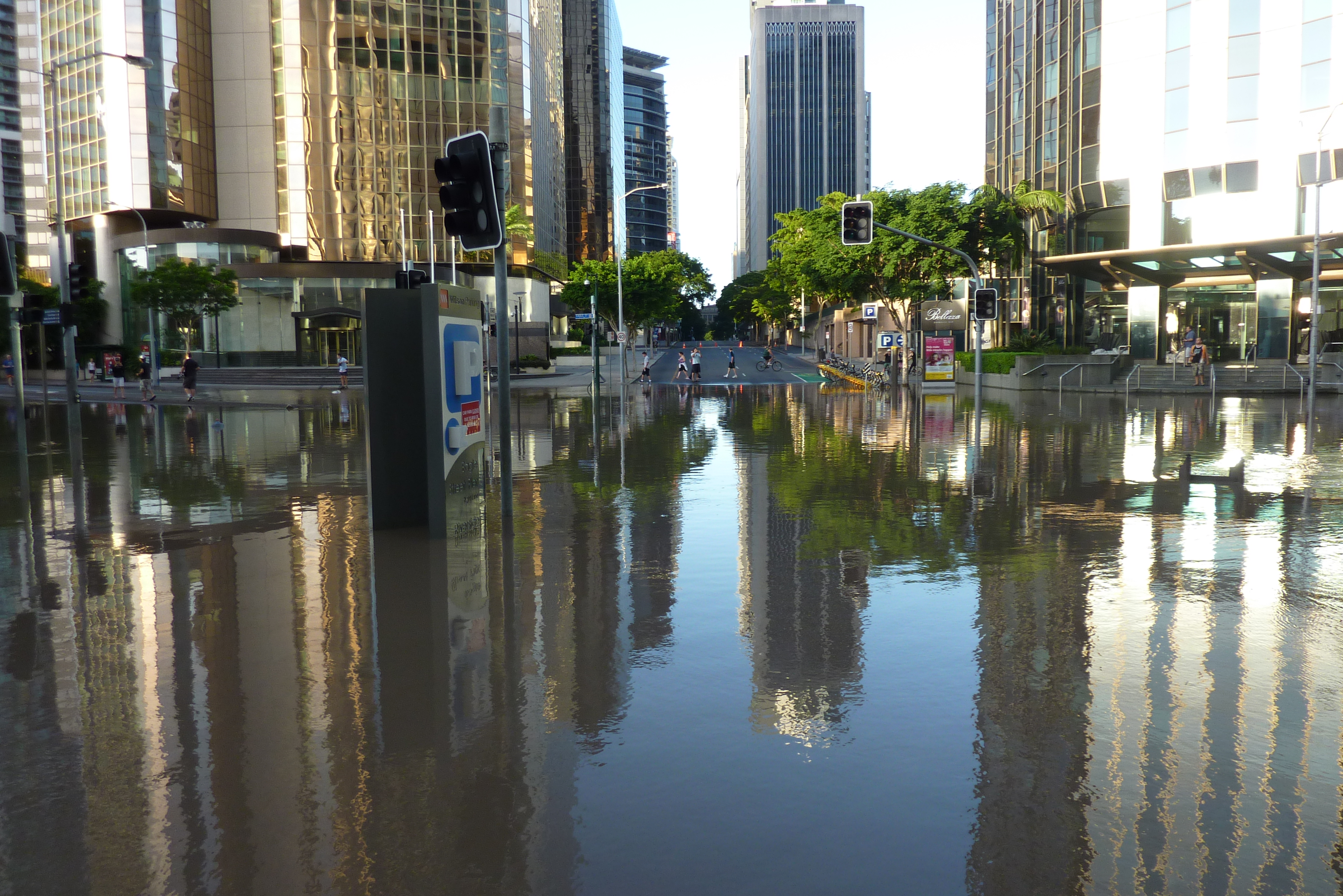
Flood waters inundate the Brisbane central business district, 2011.

In 2001, the Goodwill Games were held in Brisbane. In 2003, both Brisbane and Townsville hosted games of the 2003 Rugby World Cup. In the same year, the oil pipeline running from Jackson to Brisbane bursts open at Lytton, causing Queensland's largest-ever oil spill. Cyclone Larry crossed the Queensland coast in March 2006 becoming the costliest tropical cyclone to ever impact Australia. That year residents of Toowoomba voted against the use of recycled sewage in drinking water in a referendum, halting a project that was described as the world's most ambitious wastewater recycling scheme. 2007 saw Anna Bligh become the state's first appointed female Premier.

According to the Bureau of Meteorology 2010 was Queensland's wettest year on record. At the end of 2010 and into the next year the state experienced widespread floods. Toowoomba and the Lockyer Valley experienced severe flash flooding in January. In February 2011, Cyclone Yasi crossed the Queensland coast in February, causing more damage than Cyclone Larry. In 2018 Gold Coast hosted the 2018 Commonwealth Games. It was the first time the city has hosted the games and the second for the state of Queensland, after Brisbane in 1982.

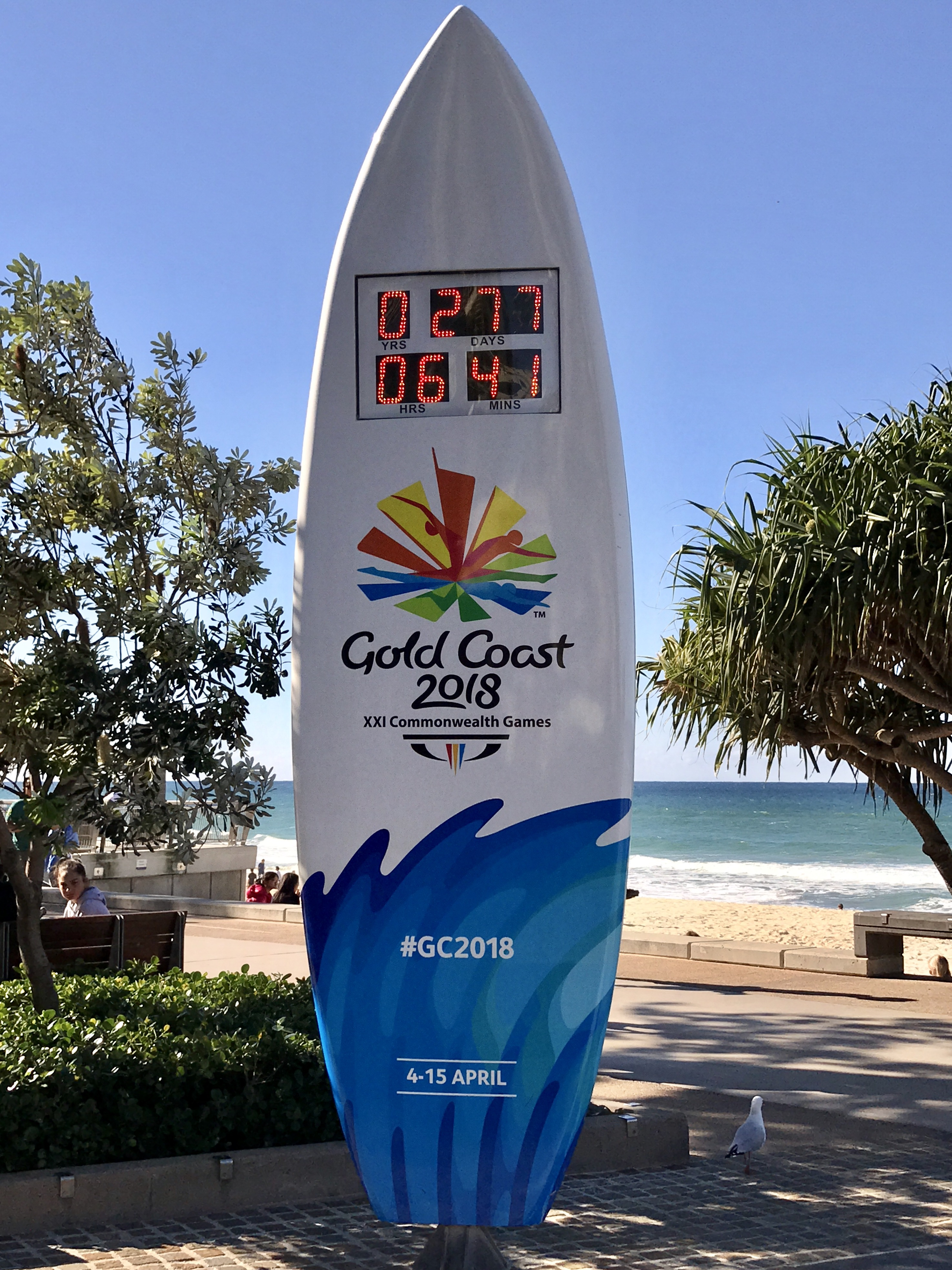
Countdown clock for the 2018 Commonwealth Games in Surfers Paradise

In 2020, despite a low number of cases during the COVID-19 pandemic, Queensland's state borders were temporarily and conditionally closed, and social distancing was introduced. In 2021, the State borders were again conditionally closed, and on July 21, it was announced that Brisbane would host the 2032 Summer Olympics.

In mid-December 2023 Cyclone Jasper caused the record 2023 Cairns floods. It became the worst flooding event in Cairns, since records began in 1915, when the Barron River exceeded its record level of March 1977 at 3.8 metres (12 ft).

In December of 2024, Premier Anastasia Palaszczuk, who had served Queensland since 2014, retired from politics and made her deputy, Steven Miles become premier of Queensland.

During Steven Miles time as Premier, most Australians and people around the world as well as Queenslanders, have been going through a cost of living crisis due to a number of factors. Because of this, Premier miles throughout 2024 brought out cost of living policies like 50 cent fares and 20 percent off car rego's, to comeback the cost of living crisis.

In October of 2024, David Crisafulli won government after the Liberal National party were in opposition for 12 years. Crisafulli ran on a campaign of law and order, while Steven Miles, who is leader of the Queensland labor party ran on policies of cost of living.

== See also ==
- Blackbirding
- History of Brisbane
- History of Cairns
- History of Gold Coast, Queensland
- History of electricity supply in Queensland
- History of Toowoomba, Queensland

== Bibliography ==
- Evans, Raymond: A History of Queensland, Cambridge 2007, 321 pages, ill.
- Ørsted-Jensen, Robert: Frontier History Revisited, Brisbane 2011, 284 pages ill.
- Reid, Gordon: A Nest of Hornets: The Massacre of the Fraser family at Hornet Bank Station, Central Queensland, 1857, and related events, Melbourne 1982.
- Rienits, Rex & Thea (1969). A Pictorial History of Australia. Hamlyn Publishing Group. ISBN 0-600-03125-X.
