= Brisbane Apollo Male Choir =

Brisbane Apollo Male Choir (formerly Brisbane Liedertafel) is the longest running male choir in Brisbane, Queensland, Australia. Formed in 1884, the choir still performs today.

== Formation and history ==
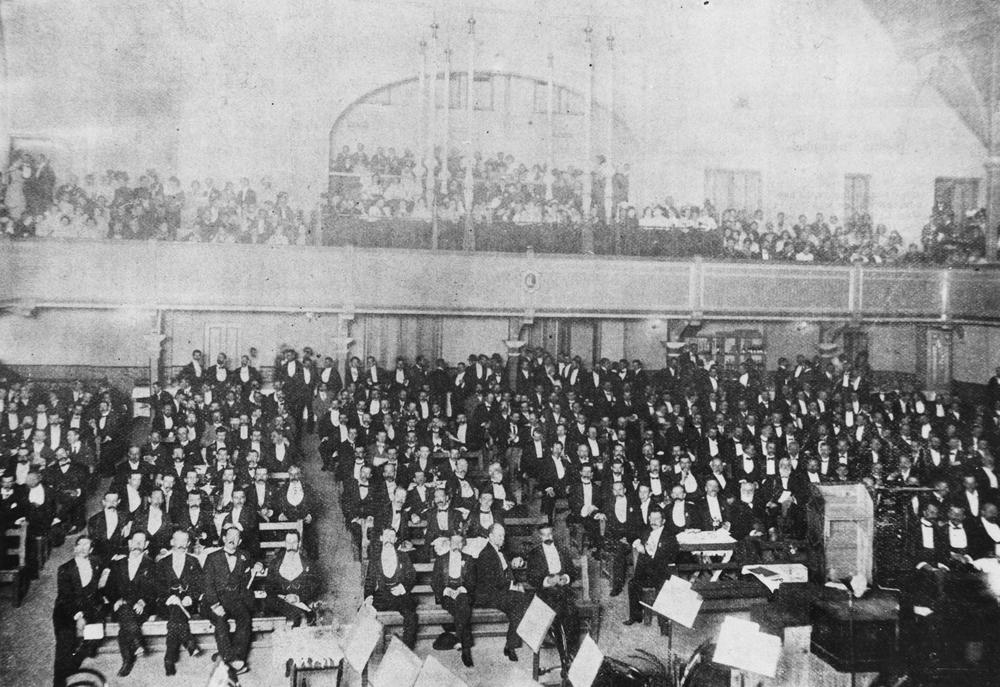
Audience photograph of a 'Liedertafel smoke concert' held in the Exhibition Concert Hall, Bowen Hills, 1901

Under its original name, Brisbane Liedertafel, the choir was formed in 1884 after a group of sixteen men expressed an interest in forming a male choir. The German word Liedertafel, meaning ‘song table’, indicates the German custom of men singing in harmony at social events. Brisbane Liedertafel's first public performance was given on 16 July 1885 at the Brisbane Town Hall.

On 23 September 1914, the Brisbane Liedertafel performed a patriotic concert at the Centennial Hall, in aid of the Queensland Patriotic Fund and the Red Cross Society. The concert was attended by Sir Arthur Morgan, Lieutenant-Governor of Queensland.

In 1916, due to anti-German sentiment prevalent during World War I, the name of the choir was changed to the Brisbane Apollo Choir, after the classical Greek God.

In 1985, the Brisbane Apollo Choir gave a special concert was given in Brisbane's City Hall to mark the centenary of the choir. Proceeds from this concert were given to St Vincent’s Hostel, South Brisbane.

The Brisbane Apollo Male Choir currently meets and rehearses at St James Anglican Church Hall at Kelvin Grove, Brisbane.

Three volumes of minutes of general meetings, committee meetings and special meetings of the Brisbane Liedertafel from 12 May 1885 to 29 May 1907 are held by State Library of Queensland.
