= Queensland Railways Patriotic Fund =

Queensland Railways Patriotic Fund was established in 1914 by the Queensland Railways Department to support railway workers who had enlisted during World War I, as well as their dependents. As part of the fund, a number of fundraising schemes were implemented including charitable subscriptions by employees, public concerts and railway excursions. By April 1918, it was estimated that over 2,350 Queensland railway employees had enlisted since the start of the war.

== Formation ==
On 19 August 1914, a delegation of employees from the Southern Division of the Queensland Railways Department attended a meeting at the Railway Commissioner’s Office in Brisbane. The purpose of the meeting was to establish a Queensland Railways Patriotic Fund to raise funds to assist fellow employees who had enlisted, as well as provide support to their dependents. At the meeting it was agreed that subscriptions to the fund by employees would be voluntary.

Arthur James Crowther, Secretary to the Railway Commissioner was elected chairman of the Queensland Railway Patriotic Fund. All monies raised would be paid into the general Queensland Patriotic Fund. Crowther also held a position on the General Sub-committee No.1 of the Queensland Patriotic Fund, so he could represent the railwaymen serving at the Front. It was reported in April 1918 that 2,350 Queensland railway employees had enlisted since the start of the Great War.

== Fundraising ==
Along with voluntary subscription by employees, the Queensland Railways Patriotic Fund also organised many other fundraising activities during the course of World War I. In September 1914, railway guard Robert Munro from Tooowoomba offered all the proceeds from the sale of his song, British Call to Arms Across the Sea, to support the Fund. On October 17, 1914, a Queensland Railways Patriotic Concert was organised with tickets sold at all Brisbane suburban railway stations. The concert was held at the Exhibition Building in Brisbane and featured the musical talents of railway staff, including a choir of 60 men from the Ipswich Railway Workshops. The concert raised £120 for the Fund. Further Queensland Railways Patriotic Concerts were held during World War I.

Ten Miles of Pennies

In February 1918, the Queensland Railways Patriotic Fund pushed to increase the amount of monies coming in by introducing the Ten Miles of Pennies scheme with the intent of raising £2,200 by July of that year. In an open letter addressed to all railway employees, published in the March edition of the Queensland Railway Railway Express, chairman of the Fund, Arthur Crowther explained the reason behind the Ten Miles of Pennies scheme.

“The Committee of the Railway Patriotic Fund regret to have to admit a serious falling off in the recipts [sic] to the Fund, the amount now received barely reaching £200 per month. The claims on the Fund on behalf of the returned soldiers and their dependents, at present, amount to £500 per month. Taking the receipts and expenditure into consideration points to the necessity of immediate action being taken to keep the Fund solvent.”

The scheme included appealing for further subscriptions from railway workers as well as other fundraising activities, such as public street collections on the 26 and 27 April and a cheap excursion train journey from Brisbane to Tweeds Heads on 21 April. Railway staff and their families volunteered their time in running these events. It was reported that £4,707 was raised during this campaign.
