= Queensland in World War I (1914) =

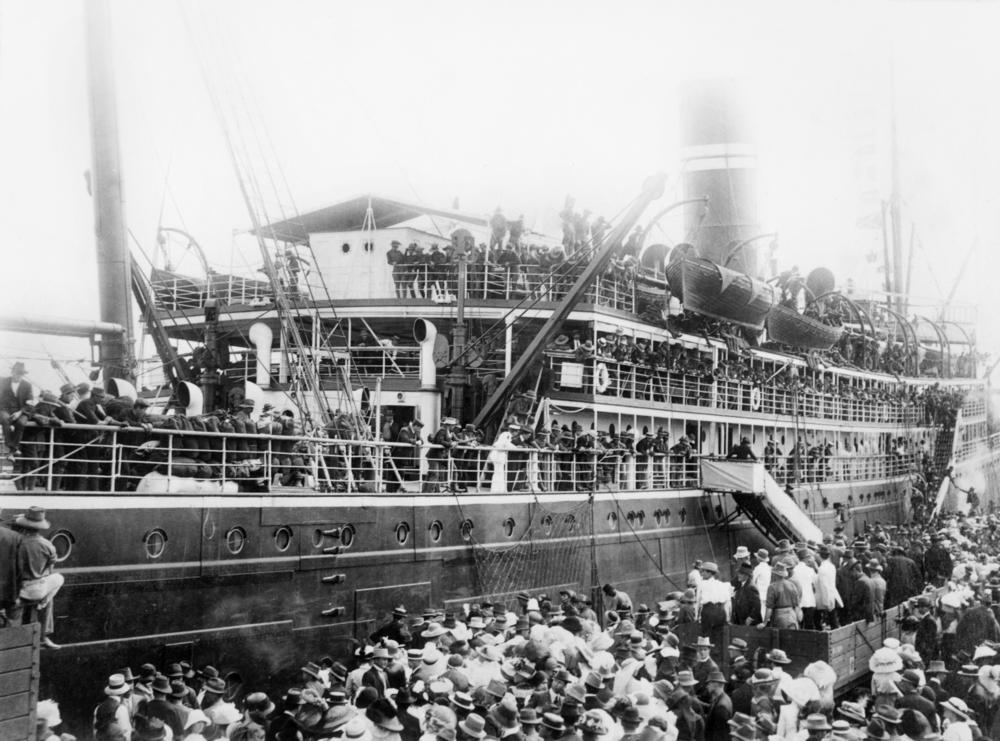
First troops leaving Townsville, Queensland, bound for Thursday Island, 1914

In 1914, war was declared between Great Britain and Germany. Queensland independently claimed war against Germany, the Austro-Hungarian Empire, Bulgaria and the Ottoman Empire, uncertain if the Australian Constitution enabled a declaration of war by the Commonwealth of Australia. In the first few weeks that followed the declaration of war, existing militia were deployed to the Australian Naval and Military Expeditionary Force which attacked and occupied German New Guinea. Heightened patriotism resulted in 2500 Queensland men volunteering for the Australian Imperial Force. German military reservists were arrested and detained.

== Before war was declared ==
The Queensland sugar industry harvested a record crop in 1913, and hopes were held for a similar outcome in 1914. There had also been an increase in tropical fruit production in the state's north. The dairy industry was also expanding, particularly in the production of exportable butter. Pastoralists farmed over 21 million sheep, only 15% of which were used for local meat consumption. Wool production remained a major industry in 1914, boosted by sales to European countries preparing for the possibility of war. Wheat production was down however, and the state was not self-sufficient in cereals. Of most concern to food production was the lack of agricultural labourers in Queensland.

The population of Queensland was approximately 600,000 - the majority of whom lived in regional urban centres. Immigration had been steadily decreasing prior to the war, with only 1168 people entering in the quarter to October 1914. A high percentage of the non-British immigrants were Russians, but rather than being farm labourers that Queensland required, many were political activists fleeing their home country. The Queensland liberal conservative government was strongly anti-socialist and regarded the Russian immigrants with suspicion.

Digby Denham had been Premier of Queensland since 1911. In that year the powerful Amalgamated Workers Association had flexed its muscle in the sugar industry, raising the ire of the government. In 1912, the Brisbane Tramway Company's anti-unionist actions created the grounds for a general strike across many industries. Almost 20,000 Queensland workers withheld their labour, but the anti-union Denham government used its police force and special constables to contain the action in a series of violent confrontations. The general strike collapsed quickly and the Government was not slow in introducing anti-strike legislation.

== Declaration of war ==
In late May 1893 the Australian press enthusiastically covered the local tour of Archduke Franz Ferdinand, the heir-apparent of the Habsburg Empire. His official visit to King George V in October 1913 was also widely reported in Australia. The announcement of his assassination in Sarajevo on 26 June 1914 was noted with regret. This event sparked World War I in which over 60,000 Australian men were killed and more than 130,000 wounded or incapacitated.

On 29 July 1914, Governor-General Sir Ronald Munro Ferguson received a cable from the British government stating that Australia should "adopt precautionary phase" for war with the "names of powers will be communicated later if necessary". The steps to take in the eventuality of hostilities had been laid down in 1907 through Imperial Defence arrangements.

Germany declared war on Russia on 1 August and proceeded to invade neutral Belgium. On 3 August, the Governor-General proclaimed "the danger of war" and called upon the enlistment of the military Citizen Forces. The federal Cabinet discussed the crisis that day. The following morning, the British Secretary of State for the Colonies asked if vessels of the Australian Navy were available for the Admiralty, along with an expeditionary force of 20,000 men. The federal Cabinet assented. Later that day, Britain declared war on Germany. This declaration of the act of war remained a royal prerogative. None of the Dominions were consulted.

The Dominions were not represented in crucial decision making until the establishment of the Imperial War Cabinet in 1917. Until 1942, Australia had no independent foreign affairs' policies. Moreover, the Australian Constitution - formulated in 1901 - was silent on the matter of the declaration of war and did not denote who was responsible for deploying troops overseas. Section 51(vi) was concerned with defence powers, elaborated in the Defence Act 1903. Under Section 61, the Governor-General exercised executive power as representative of the monarch. As Mr Justice Isaac Isaacs confirmed in the High Court in 1916 "the creation of a state of war and the establishment of peace necessarily reside in the Sovereign himself as the Head of the Empire". In keeping with this office, several proclamations were issued by the Governor-General on 5 August 1914 relating to shipping and the declaration of war by the King. In the next few days, several more proclamations were issued relating to trading with the enemy and enemy shipping.

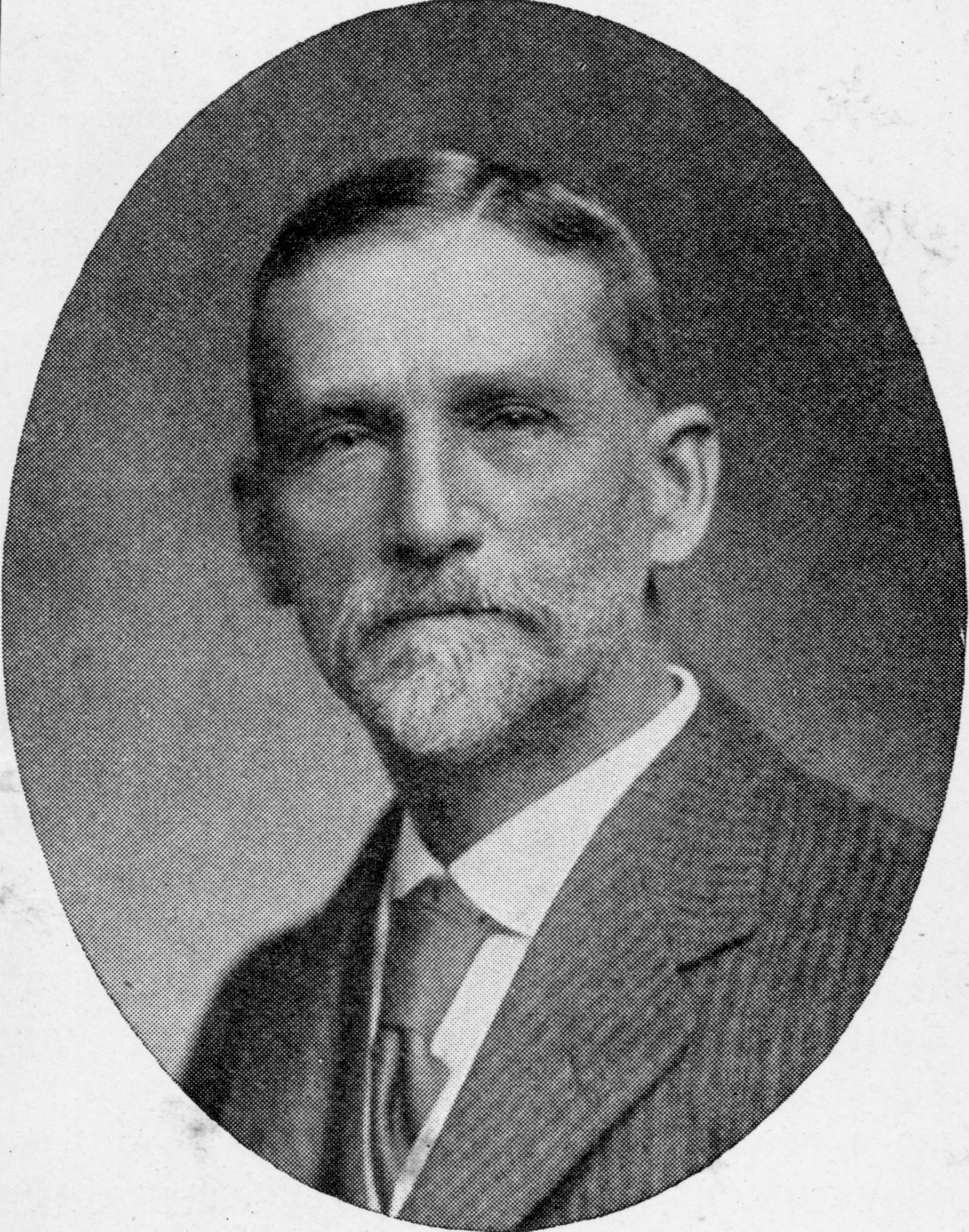
Digby Denham, Queensland Premier in 1914

When the cable was sent from London at 12.30 am on 5 August, it stated that "War has broken out with Germany. Send all State Governors". Prime Minister Joseph Cook telegrammed Queensland's Premier, Digby Denham, that day. Later that afternoon, the Lieutenant-Governor of Queensland also conveyed this news to the Premier. This process whereby information was conveyed by both the King's representatives and the Prime Minister reflects the lack of clarity on who was responsible - the declaration of war was an unprecedented act for the new Commonwealth and its wider powers of defence and national security had yet to be tested. Even when it was clear by implicit understanding that the Australian Constitution was an arrangement between the monarch, the six sovereign states and the Commonwealth, there was no clear line of demarcation of powers.

The Commonwealth and States needed to cooperate to manage the war effort. On 6 August 1914, the Australian Agent-General in London sent a coded telegram to the Federal government: "Home Government will tonight accept offer of Australian contingent ... Shall endeavour to arrange for steamer carrying troops to also bring meat". The supply of meat was a state matter while the mobilisation of the armed forces was a Commonwealth issue. Here they were entwined seamlessly.

Though the matter appeared to reside within the powers of the Governor-General, the Queensland government - led by Liberal Digby Denham - took the extraordinary measure of issuing its own proclamations in its role as a sovereign state. Furthermore, the Queensland Constitution Act of 1867 properly did not refer to declarations of war - being concerned with the consolidation of laws relating to the new colony. Moreover, the Admiralty Court in Queensland was not vested in the Supreme Court of Queensland but was exercised by a single judge of the Court acting as the British Vice-Admiralty Court.

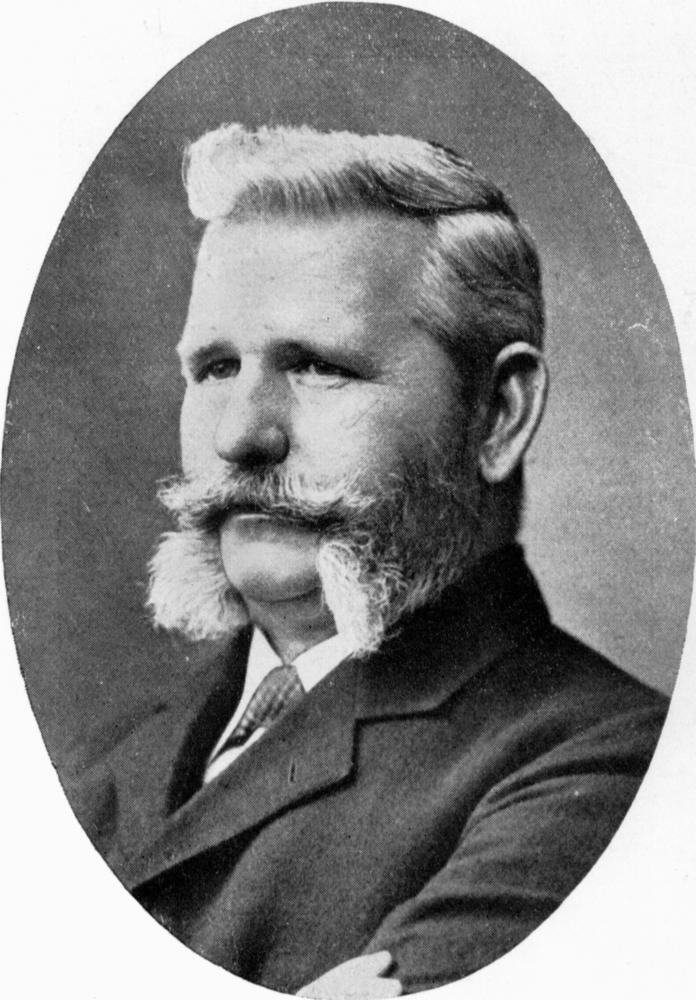
Arthur Morgan, Lieutenant-Governor of Queensland in 1914

On 20 August 1914, Queensland took a remarkable step. Sir Arthur Morgan - Lieutenant-Governor, the President of the Legislative Council and Vice-Admiral of the State of Queensland - issued an independent proclamation that war had broken out between His Majesty and the German Emperor and that all enemy shipping could be confiscated under the Prize Act of 1894. This Imperial legislation, amended in 1908 and effective in all British jurisdictions, was concerned with the property of declared enemies that could be rightfully claimed as war prize. All members of the Cabinet initialled the order. The Governor-General was informed three days later. On 19 August, the Governor-General issued a proclamation under the Imperial Prize Courts Act regarding the outbreak of war with Austria and Hungary.

On 27 August, a further Queensland proclamation stated that a state of war existed between King George V and the Emperor of Austria and Hungary Francis Joseph I. Approved by the Queensland Cabinet, the order to prepare the proclamation was sent to the Lieutenant-Governor, the Chief Justice of the Supreme Court and to the judge in the Admiralty Court. On 4 November, the Queensland Governor, Sir Hamilton Goold-Adams, issued a proclamation stating that war had been declared between the King George V and the King of Bulgaria. Further on 11 November - acting in the capacity of Lieutenant-Governor of Queensland - Morgan declared that war had broken out between King George V and the Sultan of Turkey Mehmed V.

== After war was declared ==
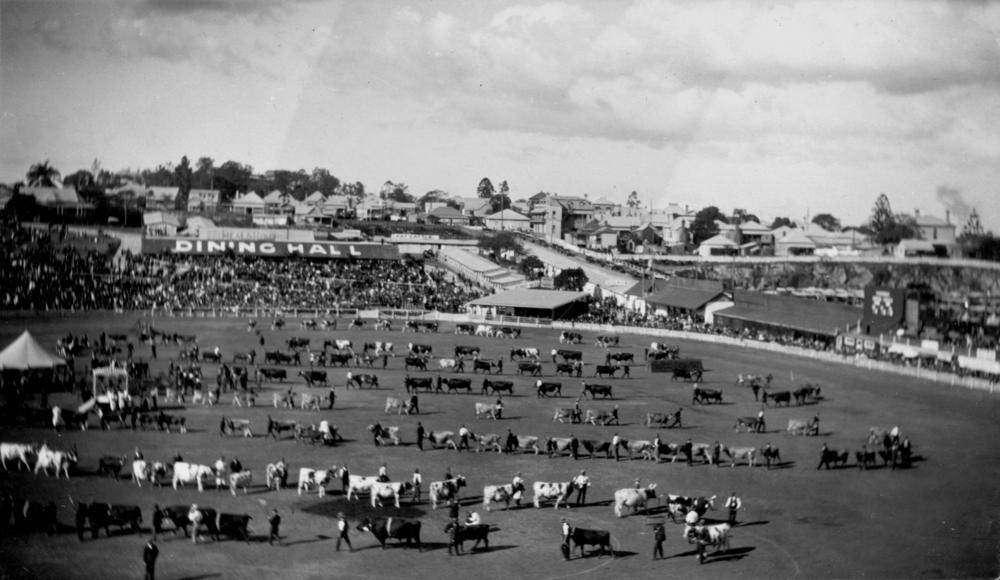
Cattle parading in the show ring in front of a large crowd at the Exhibition Ground, Brisbane, 1914

Despite the declaration of war, life in Queensland appeared to continue during the first month of war much as it had previously. The 38th Annual Show, the Brisbane Exhibition, went ahead as planned from 10 August. It was a success, with more exhibits and prize money, perfect weather and record attendance figures. The event showcased the pastoral and agricultural industries on which the state's economy was based.

Parliament was already in session when war was declared in 1914, and it remained in session and active for nearly six months. The Brisbane Industrial Council had urged the Government to prevent exploitive price increases on the outbreak of war, and the Denham government considered legislation almost immediately. It introduced a Bill to set a process for determining the price at which food commodities could be sold. The subsequent Act was not popular with either end of the political spectrum; merchants and unions alike finding fault with its implementation. It was one of many actions that contributed to the unpopularity of the government.

On the outbreak of war former British servicemen in Australia who had remained on their country's Reserve list were expected to join the armed services. The Commonwealth devolved the responsibility for ensuring these enlistments happened to the States. The Queensland Police were tasked with locating the reservists and reminding them of their duty.

German or Austrian residents of Queensland who were reservists in their national armies came under immediate suspicion, and instructions were issued for their arrest and detention – again, a role that the Queensland Police were undertaking within the second week of August. A small number of German passenger and merchant vessels in Queensland ports were not allowed to leave once war was declared. The crews were initially confined to their ships and later interned as prisoners of war. Dr Eugen Hirschfeld voluntarily resigned from the Queensland Legislative Council; the German-born medical practitioner had naturalised as a British subject in May 1893 but had continued to take a leading role in the German community of Queensland, including his appointment as German Consul in 1906. Although his loyalties were never in doubt in 1914, he was interned in February 1916.

In Queensland, the most immediate physical impact of the war was the early mobilisation of the local militia forces - an action which went largely unnoticed. The Kennedy Regiment in Townsville was sent to Thursday Island where it was garrisoned until the end of August. From there it joined the Australian Naval and Military Expeditionary Force attack on German New Guinea in the following month, the first engagement of Australian troops in the war.

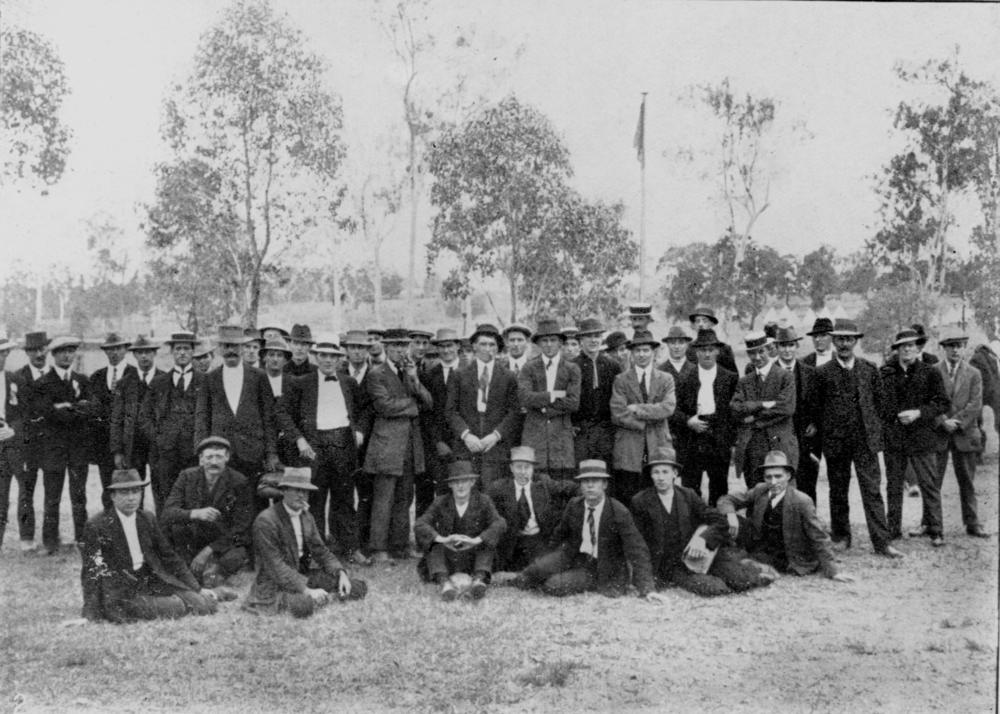
Group of Queensland men waiting to enlist, 1914

War also engendered a heightened sense of patriotism across many sections of Queensland society. Recruiting for the Australian Imperial Force, the volunteer force which was to form the bulk of Australia's military contribution to the war, commenced on the same day the Brisbane Exhibition opened. Queensland was set an initial quota of approximately 2500 men based on its population, which it had met by September 1914. Military service increased the labour shortage in Queensland.

Patriotic feelings were also expressed by making direct contributions towards the welfare of fighting troops, or to the war effort generally. Patriotic fundraising organisations formed rapidly across the state during August 1914, and the general public willingly supported them. For example, the Queensland Public Service organised their own Patriotic Fund to aid the families of public servants who volunteered for active service. Also in August 1914, Queensland railway employees established the Queensland Railways Patriotic Fund. Collectively, these organisations had raised almost £100,000 by the end of the month of August.

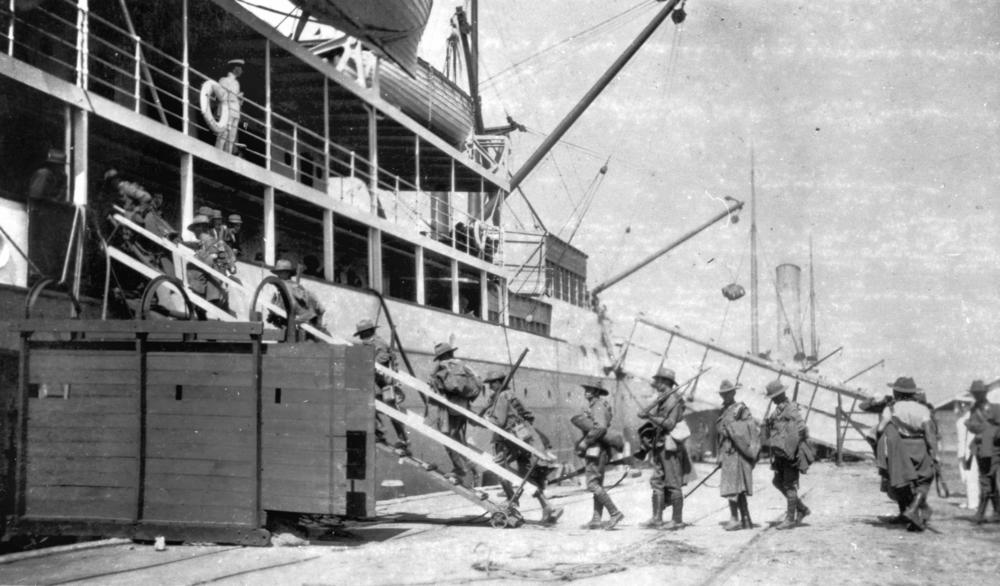
Soldiers of the 5th Light Horse embarking for overseas in World War I, 1914
