= Military recruitment in Queensland in World War I =

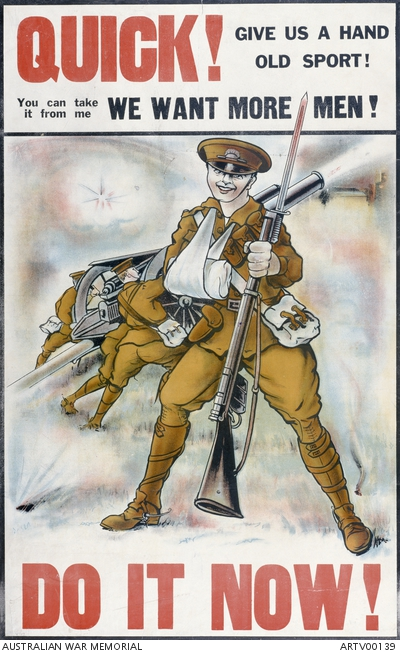
Do it now! - military recruitment poster issued by the Queensland Recruiting Committee, circa 1914-1915

During World War I, extensive military recruitment took place in Queensland. Although many enlisted voluntarily, there was considerable pressure for the unwilling to enlist, including two unsuccessful attempts to introduce conscription in 1916 and 1917. Overall, more than 57,700 Queenslanders fought in World War I and over 10,000 of them died.

== History ==
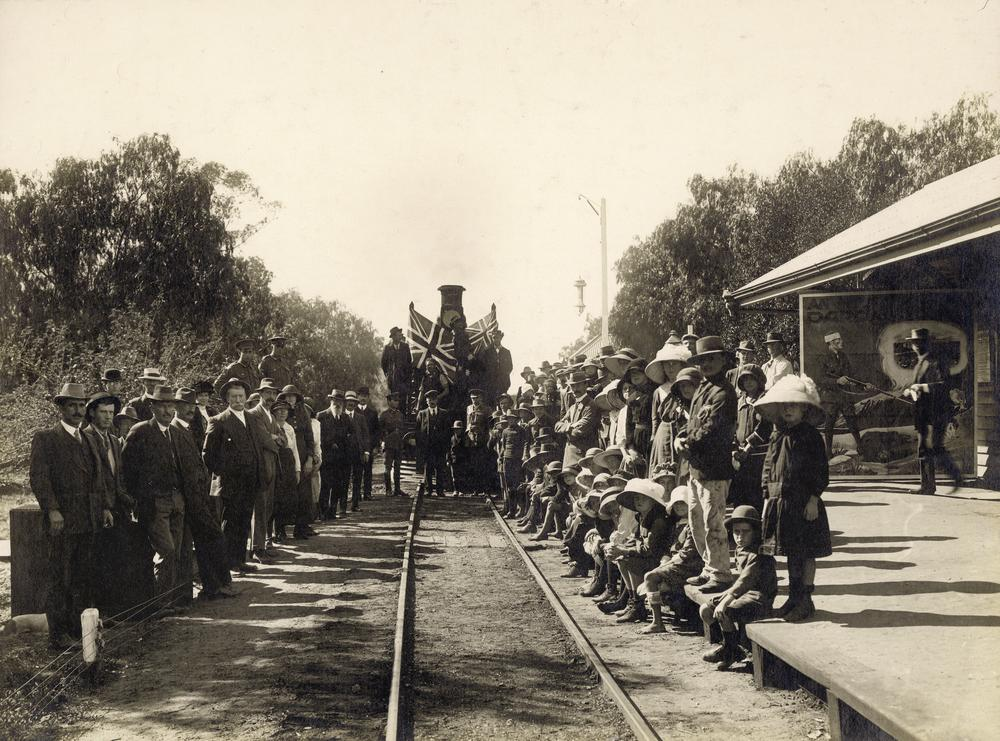
Recruiting train at Wallumbilla Railway Station, ca. 1915

The recruitment of the Australian Imperial Force (AIF) during the First World War has been called "the greatest effort that Australia ever made as a nation". Approximately 417,000 Australians enlisted voluntarily between 1914 and 1918, of which more than 57,700 were Queenslanders. This figure constituted about 40 per cent of all men aged between 18 and 45 years of age. The recruitment initiatives during the war involved a considerable degree of state, social, media and moral pressure brought to bear on eligible males to enlist ("take the king's shilling"), especially in the later years of the war.

Britain's declaration of war against Germany and Austria-Hungary in August 1914 was greeted in Australia with popular enthusiasm. Though artificially high fitness standards were set by army doctors at the outset, more than 52,000 men had enlisted by the end of 1914. Accounts of extraordinary individual efforts to join up are legion. A Queensland grazier rode nearly 500 miles to the closest railhead to offer himself to the Australian Light Horse in Adelaide. There the quota was filled. He sailed to Hobart and once again faced disappointment. He eventually enlisted in Sydney as a private. Enthusiasm for the war was high and no special recruiting agencies were required. "Everything went with a swing", an official report at the time recorded.

After a lull in the early months of 1915, national excitement around the Gallipoli landing in April, indignation and horror around the sinking of the Lusitania in May 1915, and an imperial call for reinforcements – in the form of a letter from the King George V to state premiers – kept the recruiting officials busy. In September 1915 the federal government undertook a war census which required completion by all males between the ages of 18 and 60. The census was followed in December by a call to arms – an enlistment appeal in the form of a letter from the Prime Minister addressed to all eligible men inviting them to enlist and asking "If they were not prepared to do so, why not?". The Queensland Recruiting Committee – which included members of parliament, clergymen and local government officials – was formed in June 1915, and, unlike their counterparts in other states, was initially an independent and privately funded body of citizen volunteers. It was chaired by prominent Brisbane lawyer Andrew Joseph Thynne. In October 1915 it came under the aegis of the recently appointed Queensland War Council.

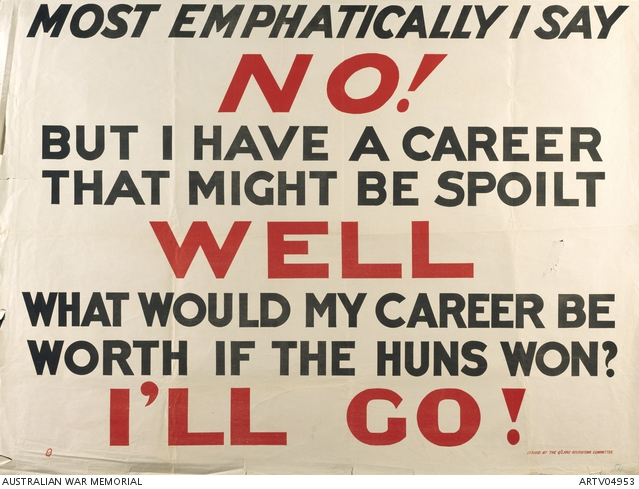
"Most emphatically I say No!" - recruitment poster by the Queensland Recruiting Committee

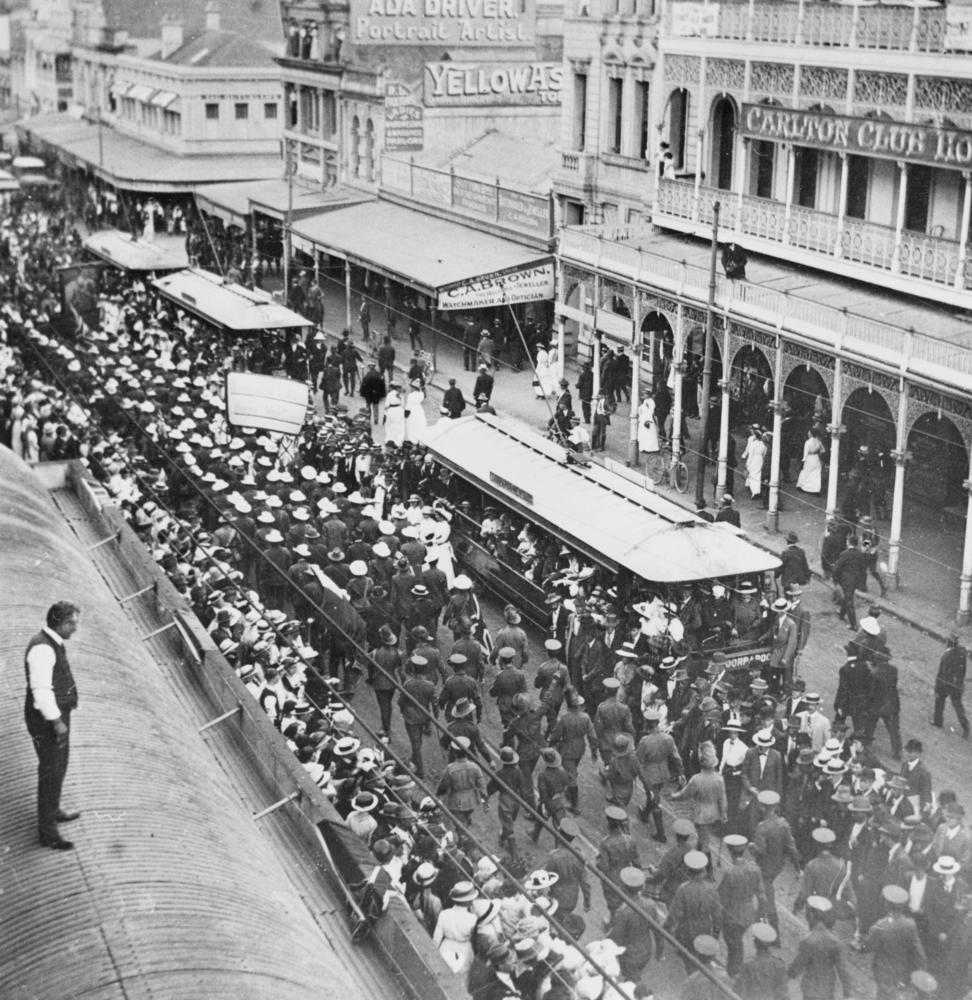
March of the Dungarees, arriving in Queen Street, Brisbane, 1915

National enthusiasm for enlistment was on the wane by the later half of 1915. July 1915 was the highest enlistment month of the war, but as rates declined in the subsequent months, recruiters employed a variety of methods to increase numbers including extensive press advertising and billboards. Soapbox recruiters sought to gather a crowd on street corners. Recruiting trains were organised as were snowball marches. One example of a snowball march in Queensland was that of the March of the Dungarees, a group of enlistees who left Warwick in November 1915 to march to Brisbane, and who gathered other recruits on the way. However, the ongoing publication of casualty lists meant that the naïve enthusiasm for war evident in 1914 was increasingly replaced by a sense of hardened resolution and grimmer purpose. Most willing volunteers had already joined the colours by the end of 1915.

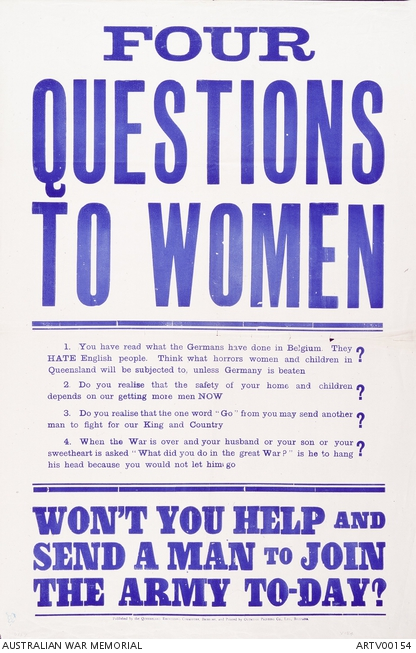
Four questions to women - military recruitment poster in World War I produced by the Queensland Recruiting Committee

By May 1916 the Queensland Recruiting Committee had instituted a centralised and cross-referenced filing system. This filing system provided the Committee with detailed records of 120,000 eligible males in Queensland and used a classification system to show availability in terms of family responsibilities, work commitments and other factors. This elaborate and detailed organisation was informed as much by the expectation of conscription as it was by the ongoing campaign for voluntary enlistment. Recruiting organisers increasingly believed that the voluntary system had reached its limit and invested in the success of compulsory conscription which had been publicly advocated by the Universal Service League and others since September 1915. The government under William Morris Hughes offered a plebiscite on the issue of conscription – campaigning for which proved highly socially and politically divisive. This debate helped to shatter any illusion of national unanimity around the war issue. The plebiscite was narrowly defeated on 28 October 1916. A second plebiscite in December 1917 was also defeated. Campaigning prior to the second vote proved even more vitriolic and divisive than the first. In the wake of these setbacks, recruiting organisers pulled out all stops to meet the quotas demanded by the government.

There was no neutral political space available for those who were eligible but chose not to enlist. They were typically branded as "shirkers", "traitors" and "pro-German". State, social and moral pressure was applied. In the wake of the conscription referendum in 1916 these accusations became more malicious. The social divisions produced by conscription and the pressure to enlist cut particularly deeply into rural communities. The myth of the digger as the military embodiment of the Australian bushman is a powerful and persistent one which had its origins in part in the writings of the prominent journalist and the war's official Australian historian Charles Bean. However, men from the cities enlisted in proportionally equal numbers to those from rural areas.

In 1917 the Queensland Recruiting Committee reported that every eligible man whose contact details could be confirmed had been interviewed at least once by a recruiting officer and summaries of the interviews were kept on file. Frequently there were follow-up interviews. Local recruiting committees were urged to ensure that rallies were held weekly and recruiting speeches were given twice daily outside the General Post Office in Brisbane. Each week Queensland newspapers carried a double-column advertisement for recruits. Racecourses, picture theatres and places of amusement were particularly targeted. Box kites were flown over the racecourse advertising the need for recruits. Despite these efforts, after the first conscription plebiscite in October 1916, the monthly recruitment quotas were never reached.

In the wake of a determined German military thrust on the Western front in March 1918 and increased anxieties about the outcome of the struggle, a national recruiting conference of all state and federal political parties was convened by the Governor-General and held in Melbourne in April 1918. The purpose of the conference was to reenergise the recruitment drive and help heal the social divisions around the war. It proved a forlorn attempt at national cohesion around voluntarism as Labor delegates increasingly aired publicly their growing anti-war sentiment and Prime Minister Hughes' polemical and high-handed style did little to appease them. The experience of war in general, and tensions around recruitment and conscription in particular, had shattered the nation's innocence and sense of unanimity. Behind the triumph and celebrations of victory there remained deep and lasting scars.
