= Trackson (automobile) =

Australian automobile from 1901

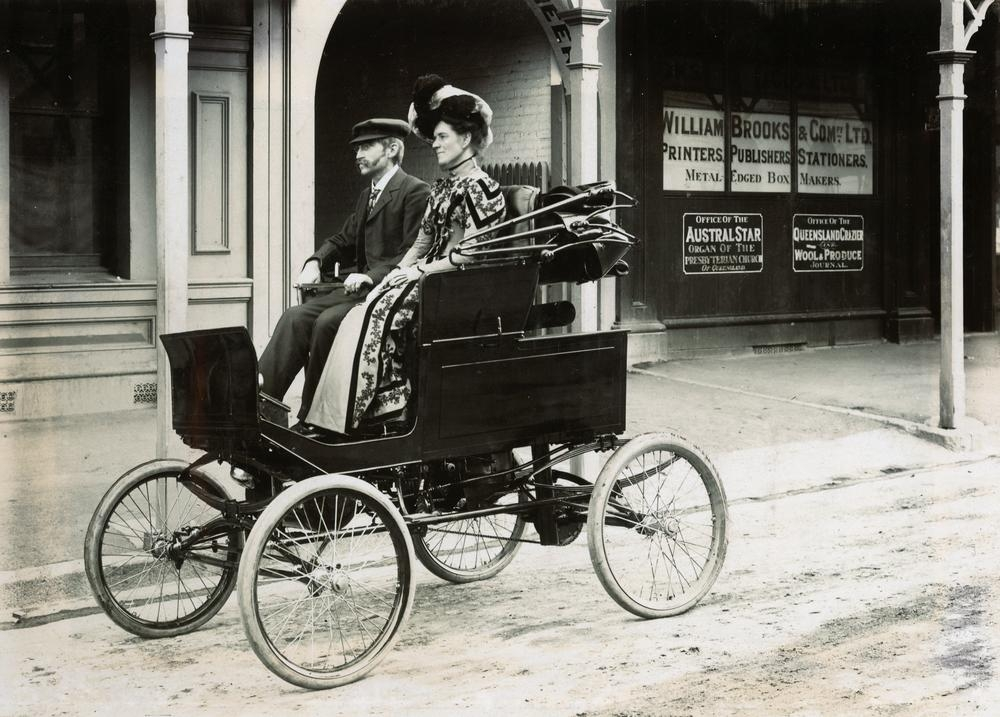
The Trackson's steam Locomobile, 1903

The Trackson was an Australian automobile built in Brisbane, Queensland by James Trackson in 1901. The design was based on a two-cylinder De Dion-Bouton car imported from France in 1900, the first in Queensland. The Trackson was powered by a 5 hp petrol engine, and had a reported top speed of 25 km/h.
