= Queensland Patriotic Fund =

Formed in 1900, the Queensland Patriotic Fund was responsible for raising funds and fund administration to provide financial and other assistance to those who were serving or had served in the armed forces of Australia, as well as offering support to their families.

== Formation ==
On 8 January 1900 a meeting was held at the Brisbane Town Hall with the purpose of amalgamating various patriotic funds throughout Queensland, under the control and supervision of one general fund, the Queensland Patriotic Fund. The first central committee of the Fund featured numerous prominent Queensland politicians and businessmen, including James Dickson as president; Robert Philp as treasurer and George Jackson as secretary.

At this meeting Dickson drafted the following resolution -

"...The duties of such committee will be to extend the operation of the fund so as to embrace all parts of the colony, and to provide for the proper distribution of the funds amongst the disabled Queensland volunteers and dependents of such Queensland volunteers as may unfortunately lose their lives in the execution of their duty, and whose dependents, in the opinion of the committee, are in need of assistance".

== World War I ==
During World War I, the Queensland Patriotic Fund were active in organising funding raising activities as well as providing assistance to returned sick, wounded and disabled soldiers and their dependents. In August 1916, all state based patriotic funds, including the Queensland Patriotic Fund were placed under the coordination of the Australian Comforts Fund.

=== Fundraising initiatives ===
A number of fundraising initiatives were held in Queensland during the World War I where all or part of the monies raised were contributed towards the Queensland Patriotic Fund. These included:

- Patriotic concert by Brisbane Liedertafel at Centennial Hall - 22 September 1914
- Patriotic Carnival, Brisbane - 30 November 1914
- Queensland's Do Without Week and Second Grand Patriotic Carnival - 26 August 1916
- Heroes' Day - 1 December 1917

The Fund also helped establish the Golden Casket lottery.
