= Queensland Public Service =

Government civil service of Queensland, Australia

- Established: 1859; 167 years ago
- Purpose: Service delivery
- Region served: Queensland
- Staff: 243,163 (30 June 2015)
- Formerly called: Queensland Civic Service

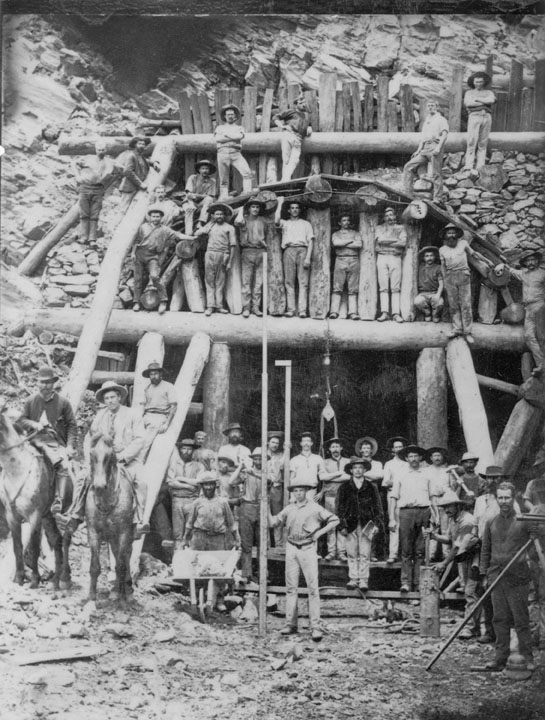
Railway workers building the Cairns to Kuranda railway, 1890

The Queensland Public Service provides public services to the people of Queensland, Australia on behalf of the Government of Queensland. Typically these are services that are deemed important by the government and which the government believes will be delivered less efficiently, effectively or cheaply if outsourced to the private marketplace.

== Organisation structure ==
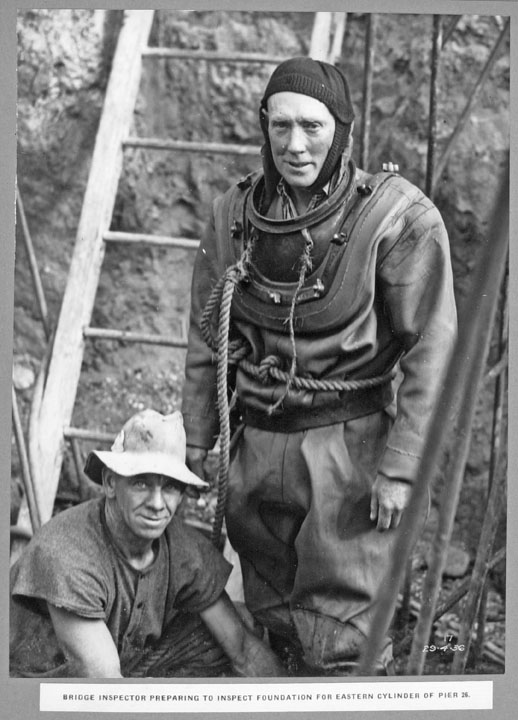
Bridge Inspector preparing to inspect the foundations for the Story Bridge, 1936

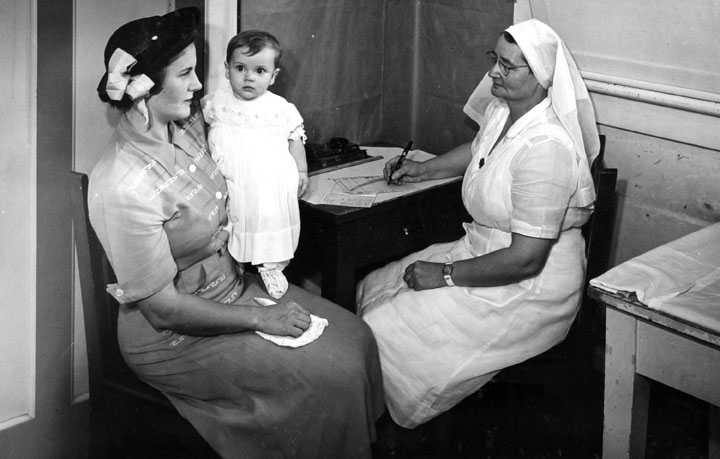
Nurse at the Mother and Child Welfare Service, 1950

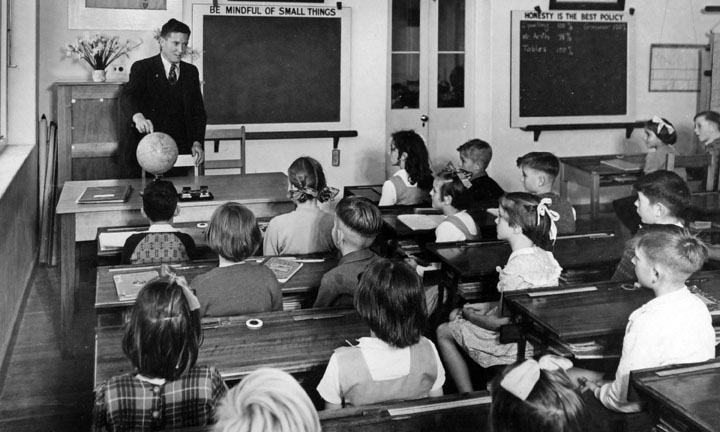
Teacher and class, Kelvin Grove State School, April 1951

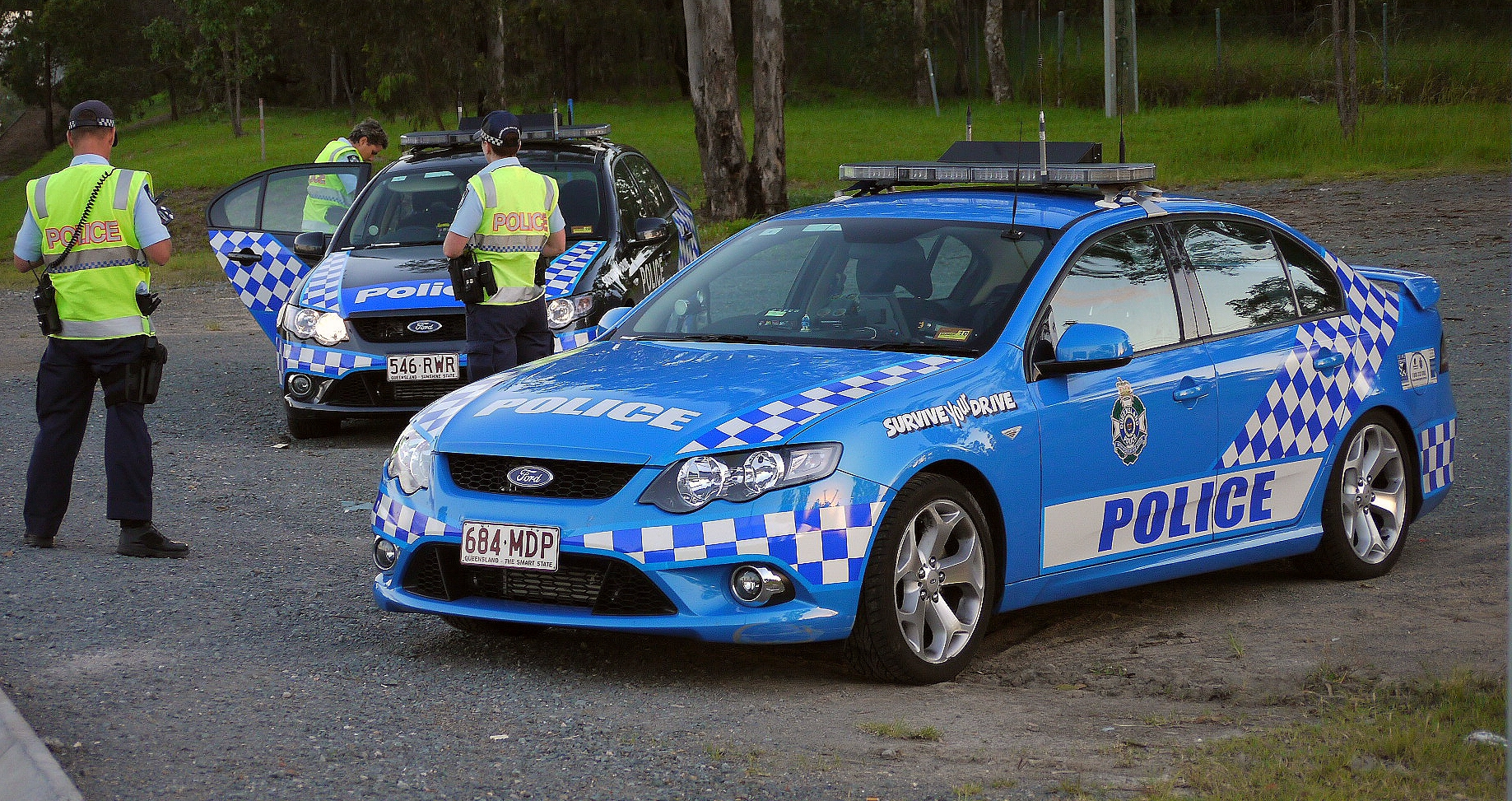
Queensland Police Service, 2012

The Queensland Premier selects a subset of the Members of the Queensland Legislative Assembly to be ministers who collectively form the Cabinet. Typically the ministers are members of the same political party as the premier or a closely aligned party. Each minister is assigned one or more portfolios (areas of responsibility), e.g.

- services for residents such as healthcare and education
- services to regulate business and promote the development of the economy, including the agriculture, mining, and tourism industries (three key export industries for Queensland)
- services that provide infrastructure such as transport, public works and emergency services
- services that underpin all of the above, such as treasury

Each portfolio has an associated set of departments and agencies which work to provide a wide range of public services related to that portfolio and the administration of legislation related to that portfolio. The leader of each department is known as the Director-General, who is the chief executive officer for the department and reports to the relevant Minister. The Director-General then employs staff within the department to provide the services. The Directors-General and their staff are generally known collectively as the Queensland Public Service and the personnel are known as public servants.

Unlike Ministers, who are chosen by elections and political processes, Directors-General and their staff are traditionally selected on merit to positions which are independent of the elections and political processes. However, as some Ministers have felt their vision for their portfolios have been frustrated by a Director-General who did not embrace their vision, Directors-General are now sometimes replaced by an incoming Minister who makes their own appointment (often by invitation) of a person who the Minister believe shares their vision. While such Directors-General are technically public servants, they are generally regarded as political appointments and their tenure is often linked to the tenure of the Minister.

== Statutory authorities ==
A statutory authority is an organisation established under separate legislation to manage a particular aspect of government administration. Most statutory bodies have their own board of management, selected or appointed in different ways. However, all must report to a Minister. Statutory authorities have varying degrees of independence to the government and public service. Some statutory authorities are dependent on government subsidies and grants and hence likely to very highly attuned to the wishes of the Minister and/or Director-General; others are funded in other ways (e.g. providing services) and enjoy greater independence as a consequence. However, as all statutory authorities exist under Queensland legislation, the Minister can assert control by changing the legislation within the Queensland Parliament. Strictly, employees of statutory authorities are not part of the Queensland Public Service, but where their positions are funded by the Queensland Government they are often treated as members of the Queensland Public Service for statistical and budgetary purposes.

== Statistics ==
At 30 June 2015, there were 243,163 staff (203,348.50 full-time equivalent) employees in 20 Queensland Government departments and 15 other organisations included for statistical purposes. The three largest government employers are Queensland Health, the Department of Education and the Queensland Police Service.

== See also ==
- Queensland Government Gazette
