= Torres Strait Islander flag =

Flag of Australian Indigenous people

Torres Strait Islanders
- Proportion: 2:3 or 1:2 (displayed above)
- Adopted: 14 July 1995
- Designed by: Bernard Namok

The Torres Strait Islander flag is the official flag of the Torres Strait Islanders, an Indigenous people of Australia. It was designed in 1992 by Bernard Namok, who won a local competition held by the Islands Coordinating Council.

It was formally presented to the Torres Strait Islander people on 29 May 1992 at the Torres Strait Cultural Festival. The next month, the flag was recognised by the Aboriginal and Torres Strait Islander Commission in June 1992. It was granted official status in 1995 under the Flags Act 1953, alongside the Australian Aboriginal flag.

== Status ==
On 14 July 1995, the Keating government advised, under section five of the Flags Act 1953, the proclamation of Namok's flag as "the flag of the Torres Strait Islander people of Australia",. The proclamation noted that the flag was "recognised as the flag of the Torres Strait Islander people of Australia and a flag of significance to the Australian nation generally".

An "administrative oversight" caused the 1995 proclamation not to be lodged to continue in force indefinitely; hence, it automatically expired on 1 January 2008. It was almost identically replaced, on 25 January 2008, with retroactive effect as from 1 January.

The Torres Strait Islander flag retains copyright protection under the Copyright Act 1968 (Cth), despite the death of Namok in 1993. The Torres Strait Island Regional Council (the body that superseded the Island Coordinating Council in 2008) asserts ownership of the copyright. It is willing to permit reproductions of the flag on request, provided that the colours used are accurate and Namok is acknowledged as the designer. Bernard Namok Jnr has argued that he and his family should own the copyright stating "it still isn't clear to me who really should own copyright to the flag".

== Colours ==
The official colours of the flag of the Torres Strait Islanders are as follows:

| Scheme | Green | Blue | Black | White |
|---|---|---|---|---|
| Pantone | 3288 C or 342 C | 301 C or 280 C | Black C | Safe |
| RGB (Hex) | 0–153–102 (#009966) | 0–0–153 (#000099) | 0–0–0 (#000000) | 255–255–255 (#FFFFFF) |
| CMYK | 100%–0%–80%–40% | 100%–70%–0%–0% | 0%–0%–0%–100% | 0%–0%–0%–0% |

== Symbolic meaning ==
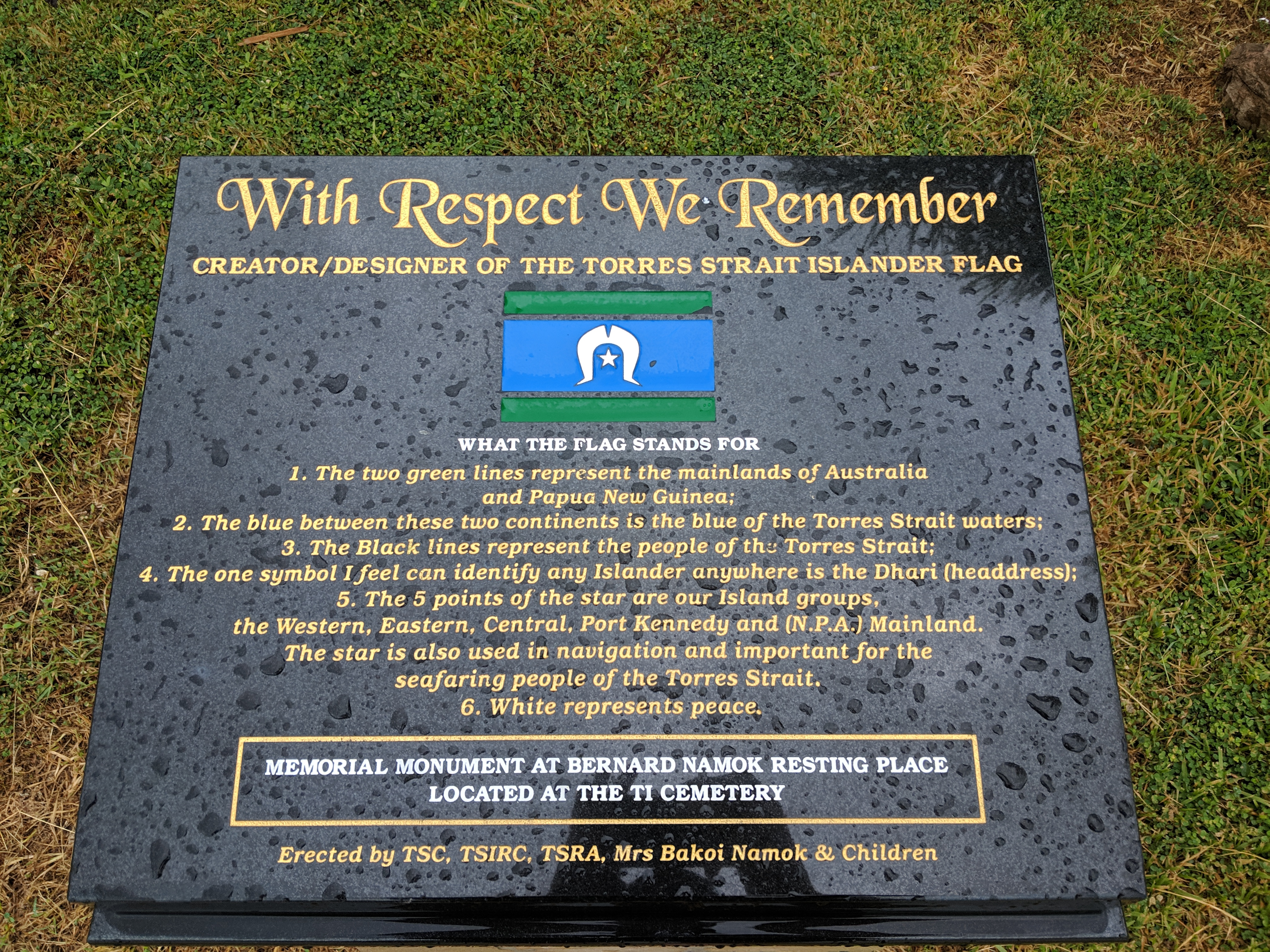
Memorial plaque explaining the meaning of the Torres Strait Islander flag, displayed on Thursday Island.

Bernard Namok gave each of flag's elements a symbolic meaning:

- Top green stripe – Migi Daudai (Papua New Guinea)
- Bottom green stripe – Koey Daudai (mainland Australia)
- Blue stripe – Malu (the sea of the Torres Strait)
- White dhari – Torres Strait Islander culture
- Black stripes – Torres Strait Islander people
- White star – Ancestors, peace, Christianity and a symbol of navigation. Each star point represents an island group of the Torres Strait:
  - Northern (Boigu, Dauan, Saibai)
  - Eastern (Erub, Mer, Ugar)
  - Western (Moa, Badu, Mabuiag)
  - Central (Masig, Poruma, Warraber, Iama)
  - Southern (Waiben, Ngurapai, Muralug, Kirriri, Northern Peninsula Area)

== Public display ==
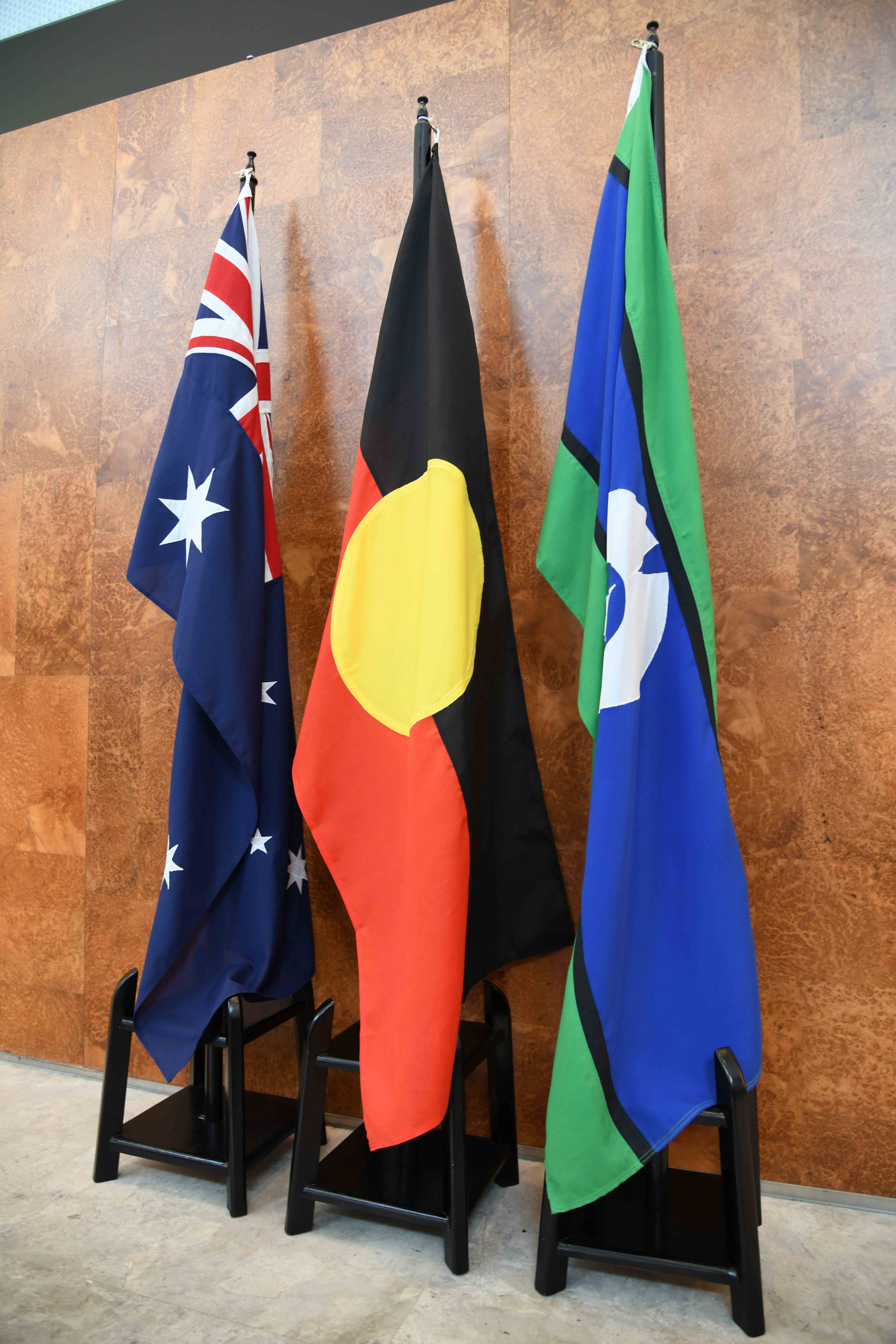
The Australian national, Aboriginal and Torres Strait Islander flags as they are often displayed at official events

Over time, the Torres Strait Islander Flag, alongside the Aboriginal Flag, have been installed permanently in many government institutions.

Following the 2022 Australian federal election on 21 May 2022, the incoming Anthony Albanese–led Labor government started displaying the Aboriginal flag and the Torres Strait Islander flag alongside the national flag at ministerial press conferences. Upon the opening of the new Parliament, both flags began to be displayed in the House of Representatives and Senate chambers.

== Local flags ==
=== Murray Island ===
Flag of Murray Island

The flag of Murray Island, located in the eastern section of the Torres Strait, consists of three vertical stripes: red ochre, white, and black representing the Torres Strait Creole. In the canton, there is a depiction of a beach hibiscus symbolizing peace and authority, placed on a white disc surrounded by eight six-pointed mullet stars representing the 8 Meriam tribes. The flag was designed by local artist Andrew Passi senior.

=== Saibai Island ===
Flag of Saibai Island

The flag of Saibai Island, situated four kilometres from the nation of Papua New Guinea. It consists of a green triangle symbolizing the land and a dark blue field representing the sea. Within the green triangle there is a yellow leaf, symbolizing peace. Additionally, an eight-pointed star represents Australia. The flag was chosen by members of the Northern Peninsula Area Regional Council.

== See also ==
- Flags of Australia
- Ethnic flag
