= Coconut Island (Queensland) =

Native name: Poruma
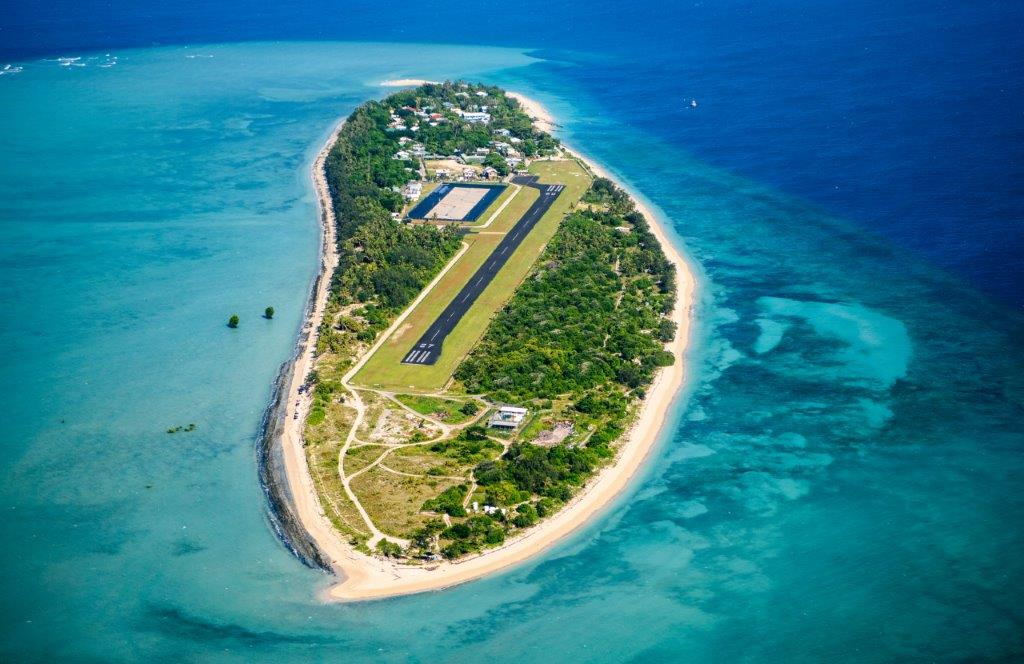
- Satellite image of Coconut Island

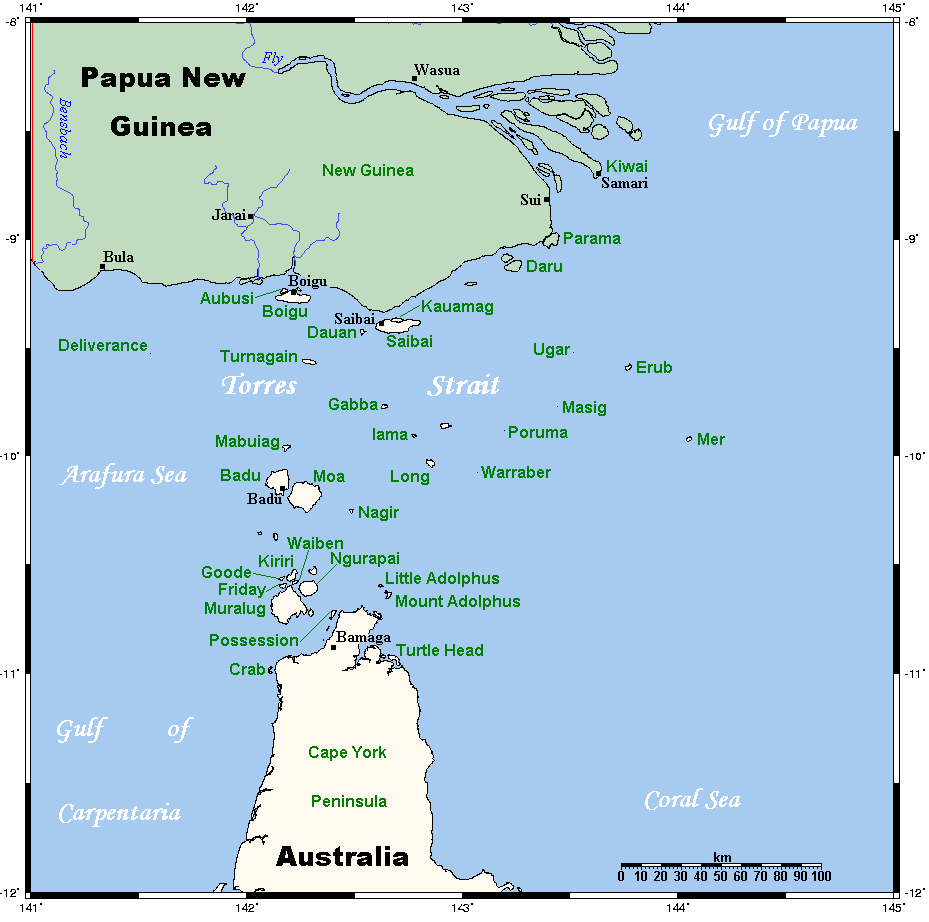
- A map of the Torres Strait Islands with the Coconut Island labelled as Poruma

Geography
- Location: Northern Australia
- Adjacent to: Great North East Channel, Torres Strait

Administration
- Australia
- State: Queensland

Coconut Island / Poruma Island
- Town
- Coordinates: 10.0502°S 143.0694°E
- Country: Australia
- State: Queensland
- LGA: Torres Strait Island Region

Government
  - State electorate: Cook
  - Federal division: Leichhardt
- Elevation: 4 m (13 ft)

Population
  - Total: 164 (2021 census)
- Postcode: 4875
- Mean max temp: 31.7 °C (89.1 °F)
- Mean min temp: 25.2 °C (77.4 °F)
- Annual rainfall: 1,309.9 mm (51.57 in)

Coconut Island, Poruma Island, or Puruma in the local language, is an island in the Great North East Channel near Cumberland Passage, Torres Strait, Queensland, Australia. One of the Torres Strait Islands, Coconut Island is 130 kilometres (81 mi) north-east of Thursday Island and 106 kilometres (66 mi) south of Papua New Guinea. It is a narrow coral island approximately 1.4 kilometres (0.87 mi) long and 400 metres (0.25 mi) wide, bounded by shallow, fringing coral reefs. Administratively, Coconut Island is a town and Poruma Island is the locality within the Shire of Torres.

The ancestors of Coconut Island built their houses out of grass, coconut leaves and trees that floated down from the Fly River jungles of Papua New Guinea.

The islands have sea turtle hatcheries, bird life, giant clam ground, huge palms, World War II relics and massive sand flats.

In the 2021 census, Poruma Island had a population of 164 people.

== Language ==
The language of Poruma (locally known as Puruma) is the Kulkalgau Ya dialect of Kalau Lagau Ya.

The Torres Strait Islander people of Poruma are of Melanesian origin and lived in village communities following traditional patterns of hunting, fishing and trade for many thousands of years before contact was made with the first European visitors to the region.

The traditional owners of Poruma are the Billy and Fauid (Fy-Hood) families.

== History ==
In the 1860s, beche-de-mer (sea cucumber) and pearling boats began working the reefs of Torres Strait. An unnamed Frenchman and an operator named Colin Thomson are believed to have harvested the reefs surrounding Poruma in the 1860s.

Another operator named Captain Walton began employing men from Poruma to work as divers and crew on his vessels in the early 1870s. An Englishman named George Pearson operated a pearling station on Poruma in the 1870s and a semi-permanent floating beche-de-mer station was established near the island around 1872.

In 1872, the Queensland Government sought to extend its jurisdiction and requested the support of the British Government. Letters Patent were issued by the British Government in 1872 creating a new boundary for the colony, which encompassed all islands within a 60 nautical mile radius of the coast of Queensland. This boundary was further extended to 96 kilometres (60 mi) by the Queensland Coast Islands Act 1879 (Qld) and included the islands of Boigu, Erub, Mer and Saibai, which lay beyond the previous 60 nautical mile limit. The new legislation enabled the Queensland Government to control and regulate bases for the beche-de-mer and pearling industries which previously had operated outside its jurisdiction.

Torres Strait Islanders refer to the arrival of London Missionary Society (LMS) missionaries in July 1871 as the "Coming of the Light". Around 1900, the LMS missionary Rev. Walker established a philanthropic business scheme named Papuan Industries Limited (PIL). PIL encouraged Islander communities to co-operatively rent or purchase their own pearl luggers or 'company boats.' The 'company boats', were used to harvest pearl shells and beche-de-mer, which was sold and distributed by PIL. The people of Poruma purchased their first company boats around 1905. Company boats provided Islanders with income and a sense of community pride and also improved transport and communication between the islands.

In November 1912, 800 acres of land on Poruma were officially gazetted as an Aboriginal reserve by the Queensland Government. Many other Torres Strait Islands were gazetted as Aboriginal reserves at the same time. A government report from 1912 mentioned that Poruma was used as a rendezvous point and anchorage for fishing and pearl boats and suggested that the Islander population be removed to Yorke Island, to allow the children of the island to attend the new school on Yorke Island. Reports from 1913 indicate that while some Islander families left Poruma and moved to Sue and Yorke Islands, many refused to leave the island.

By 1918, a Protector of Aboriginals had been appointed to Thursday Island and, during the 1920s and 1930s, racial legislation was strictly applied to Torres Strait Islanders, enabling the government to remove Islanders to reserves and mission across Queensland. A world-wide influenza epidemic reached the Torres Strait in 1920, resulting in 96 deaths in the region. The Queensland Government provided the Islands of Coconut, Yorke and Yam with food relief to help them recover from the outbreak. In March 1923, the islands of Coconut and Yorke were hit by a 'violent hurricane' which destroyed local crops and gardens.

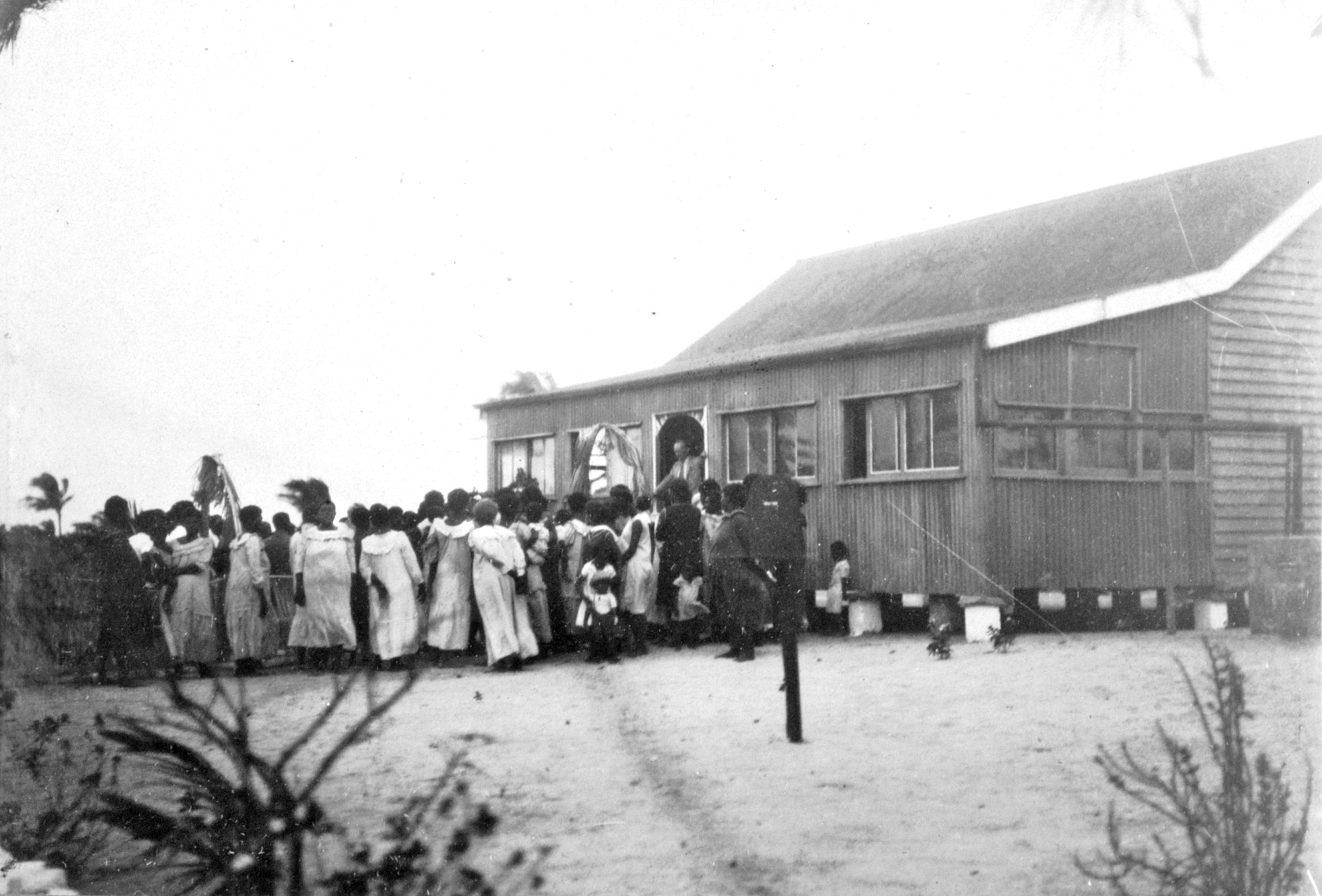
Poruma school, circa 1936

In 1936, around 70% of the Torres Strait Islander workforce went on strike in the first organised challenge against government authority made by Torres Strait Islanders. The nine-month strike was an expression of Islanders' anger and resentment at increasing government control of their livelihoods. The strike was a protest against government interference in wages, trade and commerce and also called for the lifting of evening curfews, the removal of the permit system for inter-island travel and the recognition of Islanders' right to recruit their own boat crews.

The strike produced a number of significant reforms and innovations. Unpopular local Protector J.D McLean was removed and replaced by Cornelius O’Leary. O’Leary established a system of regular consultations with elected Islander council representatives. The new island councils were given a degree of autonomy, including control over local police and courts.

On 23 August 1937, O’Leary convened the first Inter Islander Councillors Conference at Yorke Island. Representatives from 14 Torres Strait communities attended. Mimia and Abiu Fauid represented Poruma at the conference. After lengthy discussions, unpopular bylaws (including the evening curfews) were cancelled, and a new code of local representation was agreed upon. In 1939, the Queensland Government passed the Torres Strait Islander Act 1939, which incorporated many of the recommendations discussed at the conference. A key section of the new act officially recognised Torres Strait Islanders as a separate people from Aboriginal Australians.

During World War II, the Australian Government recruited Torres Strait Islander men to serve in the armed forces. Enlisted men from Coconut and other island communities formed the Torres Strait Light Infantry. While the Torres Strait Light Infantry were respected as soldiers, they only received one third of the pay given to white Australian servicemen. On 31 December 1943, members of the Torres Strait Light Infantry went on strike, calling for equal pay and equal rights. The Australian Government agreed to increase their pay to two thirds the level received by white servicemen. Full back pay was offered in compensation to the Torres Strait servicemen by the Australian Government in the 1980s. After World War II, the pearling industry declined across Torres Strait and Islanders were permitted to work and settle on the Australian mainland.

In December 1978, a treaty was signed by the Australian and Papua New Guinea governments that described the boundaries between the 2 countries and the use of the sea area by both parties. The Torres Strait Treaty, which commenced operation in February 1985, contains special provision for free movement (without passports or visas) between both countries. Free movement between communities applies to traditional activities such as fishing, trading and family gatherings which occur in a specifically created Protected Zone and nearby areas.

Coconut Island State School opened on 29 January 1985. On 23 March 2005, it was renamed Poruma State School. On 1 January 2007, the school became a campus of Tagai State College and was renamed Tagai State College - Poruma Campus.

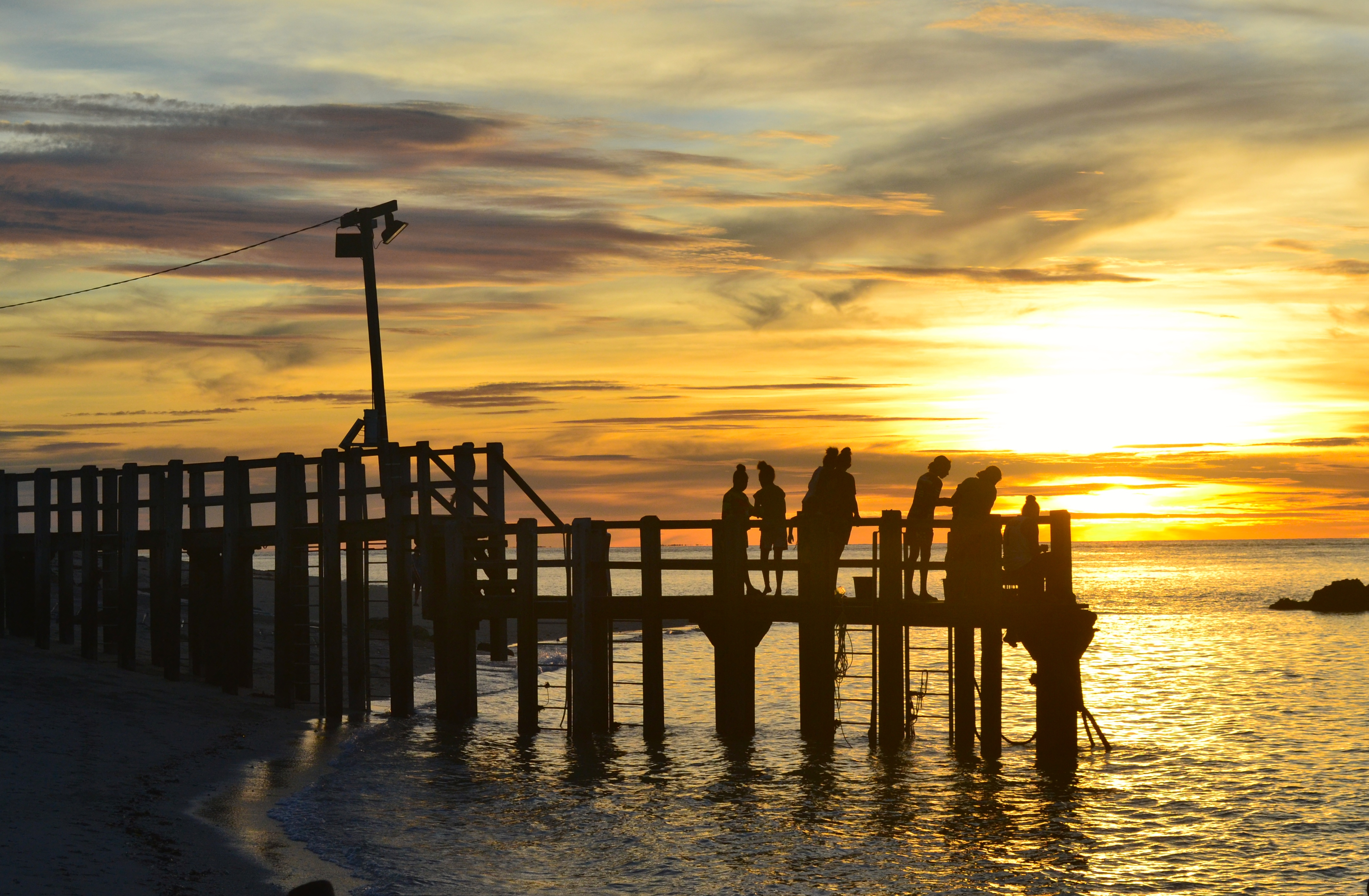
Coconut Island jetty at sunset, 2024

On 30 March 1985, the Poruma community elected 3 councillors to constitute an autonomous Poruma Council established under the Community Services (Torres Strait) Act 1984. The act conferred local government type powers and responsibilities upon Torres Strait Islander councils. The council area, previously an Aboriginal reserve held by the Queensland Government, was transferred on 21 October 1985 to the trusteeship of the council under a Deed of Grant in Trust. On 24 April 2002, the council's name was changed from Poruma Council to Poruma Island Council. In 2007, the Local Government Reform Commission recommended that the 15 Torres Strait Island councils be abolished and the Torres Strait Island Regional Council (TSIRC) be established in their place. In elections conducted under the Local Government Act 1993 on 15 March 2008, members of the 15 communities comprising the Torres Strait Island Regional Council local government area each voted for a local councillor and a mayor to constitute a council of 15 councillors plus a mayor.

== Climate ==
Coconut Island has a tropical savanna climate (Köppen: Aw) with a wet season from December to May and a dry season from June to November. The wettest recorded day was 6 January 2001 with 184.0 mm (7.24 in) of rainfall. Extreme temperatures ranged from 37.9 °C (100.2 °F) on 3 December 2023 to 19.0 °C (66.2 °F) on 14 August 2004.

Climate data for Coconut Island (10.05°S 143.07°E) (4 m (13 ft) AMSL) (1993-2025)
| Month | Jan | Feb | Mar | Apr | May | Jun | Jul | Aug | Sep | Oct | Nov | Dec | Year |
|---|---|---|---|---|---|---|---|---|---|---|---|---|---|
| Record high °C (°F) | 36.6 (97.9) | 35.6 (96.1) | 36.0 (96.8) | 36.6 (97.9) | 34.9 (94.8) | 35.1 (95.2) | 34.7 (94.5) | 34.9 (94.8) | 35.6 (96.1) | 37.5 (99.5) | 37.8 (100.0) | 37.9 (100.2) | 37.9 (100.2) |
| Mean daily maximum °C (°F) | 31.9 (89.4) | 31.6 (88.9) | 31.8 (89.2) | 31.8 (89.2) | 31.4 (88.5) | 30.7 (87.3) | 30.1 (86.2) | 30.5 (86.9) | 31.5 (88.7) | 32.6 (90.7) | 33.4 (92.1) | 33.2 (91.8) | 31.7 (89.1) |
| Mean daily minimum °C (°F) | 26.0 (78.8) | 25.9 (78.6) | 25.9 (78.6) | 25.8 (78.4) | 25.6 (78.1) | 24.9 (76.8) | 24.1 (75.4) | 23.8 (74.8) | 24.3 (75.7) | 24.9 (76.8) | 25.6 (78.1) | 26.2 (79.2) | 25.3 (77.4) |
| Record low °C (°F) | 20.0 (68.0) | 21.0 (69.8) | 22.0 (71.6) | 20.0 (68.0) | 20.2 (68.4) | 21.9 (71.4) | 19.2 (66.6) | 19.0 (66.2) | 21.2 (70.2) | 20.0 (68.0) | 20.0 (68.0) | 22.0 (71.6) | 19.0 (66.2) |
| Average precipitation mm (inches) | 248.8 (9.80) | 243.1 (9.57) | 274.7 (10.81) | 179.9 (7.08) | 86.6 (3.41) | 29.2 (1.15) | 20.9 (0.82) | 13.8 (0.54) | 7.7 (0.30) | 13.0 (0.51) | 58.0 (2.28) | 139.1 (5.48) | 1,309.9 (51.57) |
| Average precipitation days (≥ 1.0 mm) | 12.3 | 13.0 | 13.6 | 10.9 | 8.8 | 6.4 | 5.7 | 3.1 | 2.2 | 1.9 | 3.7 | 7.9 | 89.5 |
Source: Bureau of Meteorology (1993-2025)

== Demographics ==
In the 2011 census, Poruma Island had a population of 149 people.

In the 2016 census, Poruma Island had a population of 167 people.

In the 2021 census, Poruma Island had a population of 164 people.

== Education ==
The Poruma Campus of Tagai State College is a primary (Early Childhood-6) school at Olandi Street (10.0503°S 143.0641°E). The college has its headquarters on Thursday Island.

== Amenities ==
The Torres Strait Island Regional Council operates the Poruma (Ngalpun Ngulaygaw Lag) Library on Main Street.

== See also ==
- Coconut Island Airport
- List of Torres Strait Islands
