= Torres Strait Islands =

Group of islands in the Torres Strait between Australia and New Guinea

- Torres Strait Islander Flag

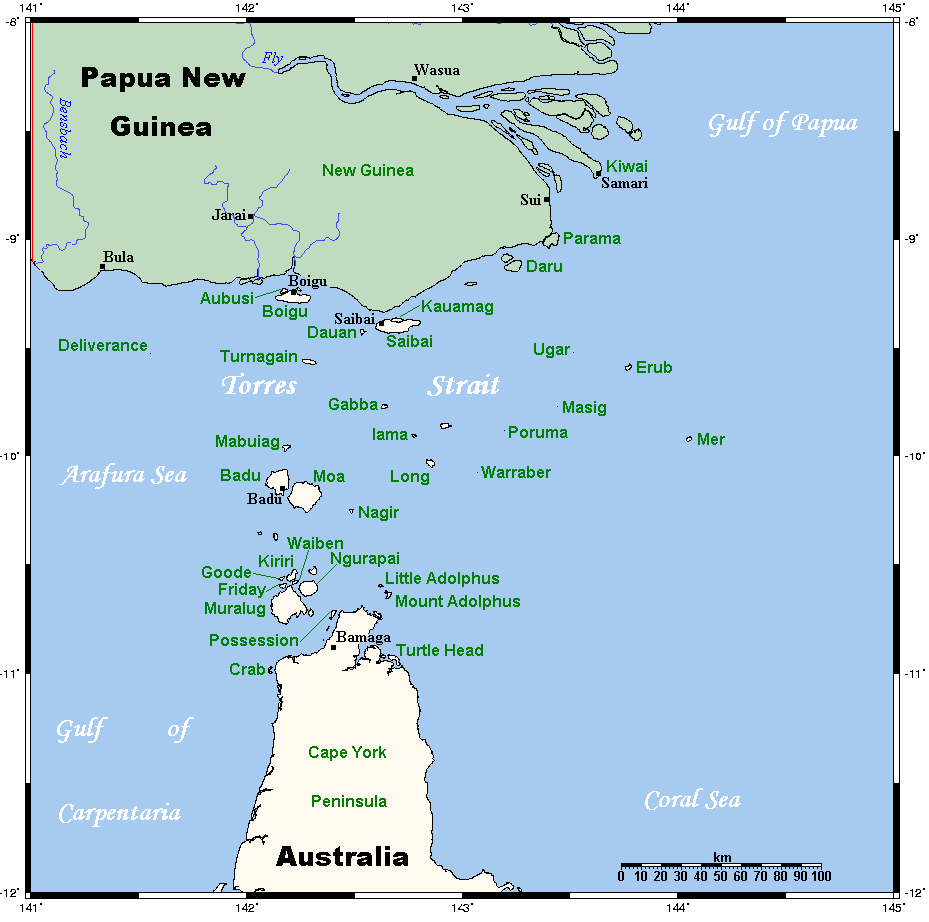
- Location of the Torres Strait Islands, between Cape York Peninsula, Queensland, Australia and Papua New Guinea.

Geography
- Coordinates: 10.579°S 142.220°E
- Area: 566 km^{2} (219 sq mi)

Administration
- Australia
- Torres Strait Regional Authority
- Capital and largest city: Thursday Island
- Chairman^{a} Chief Executive Officer^{a}: Napau Pedro Stephen; Leilani Bin-Juda

Demographics
- Demonym: Torres Strait Islander
- Population: 4,514 (2016)
- Languages: English; important local languages: Kalau Lagau Ya, Meriam Mir, Torres Strait Creole

The Torres Strait Islands are an archipelago of at least 274 small islands in the Torres Strait, a waterway separating far northern continental Australia's Cape York Peninsula and the island of New Guinea. They span an area of 48,000 km^{2} (19,000 sq mi), but their total land area is 566 km^{2} (219 sq mi). They are a part of Queensland and not an independent nation.

The Islands are inhabited by the indigenous Torres Strait Islanders. Lieutenant James Cook first claimed British sovereignty over the eastern part of Australia at Possession Island in 1770, but British administrative control only began in the Torres Strait Islands in 1862. The islands are now mostly part of Queensland, a constituent State of the Commonwealth of Australia, but are administered by the Torres Strait Regional Authority, a statutory authority of the Australian federal government. A few islands very close to the coast of mainland New Guinea belong to the Western Province of Papua New Guinea, most importantly Daru Island and its provincial capital, Daru.

Only 17 of the islands are inhabited. The Torres Strait Islands' population was recorded at 4,514 in the 2016 Australian census, with 91.8% of these identifying as Indigenous Torres Strait Island peoples. Although counted as Indigenous Australians, Torres Strait Islander peoples, being predominantly Melanesian, are ethnically and culturally different from Aboriginal Australians.

== Post-colonial history ==
The Spanish Explorer Luís Vaez de Torres sailed the Torres Strait in 1606. Torres had joined the expedition of Pedro Fernandes de Queirós, which sailed west from Peru across the Pacific Ocean, in search of Terra Australis.

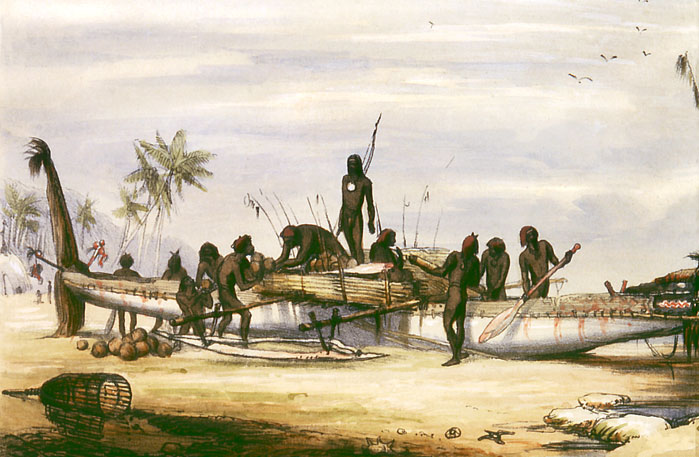
Trading canoe at Erub (Darnley Island), c. 1849

Lieutenant James Cook first claimed British sovereignty in 1770 over the eastern part of Australia at Possession Island, calling it New South Wales in the Name of His Majesty King George the Third.

British administrative control did not begin until 1862 in the Torres Strait Islands, marked by the appointment of John Jardine, police magistrate at Rockhampton, as Government Resident in the Torres Straits. He originally established a small settlement on Albany Island, but on 1 August 1864 he settled at Somerset Island. Although the Torres Strait Islanders had long dived for pearl shells themselves, the international industry of pearl and trochus shells, for using the mother of pearl as decoration, started in earnest in the 1860s. By the 1890s, the islands were supplying more than 50 per cent of the world's pearl shells.

The London Missionary Society (LMS) mission, led by Rev. Samuel Macfarlane, arrived on Erub (Darnley Island) on 1 July 1871. After the Anglican Church took over their mission in the 20th century, they referred to the events as "The Coming of the Light", and established an annual Coming of the Light Festival on 1 July.

In 1872, the boundary of Queensland was extended to include Thursday Island and other islands in Torres Strait within 60 miles of the Queensland coast.

In June 1875, a measles epidemic killed about 25% of the population, with some islands suffering losses of up to 80%, as the islanders had no natural immunity to European diseases.

In 1879, Queensland annexed the other Torres Strait Islands. They were classified as part of the British colony of Queensland and, after 1901, of the Australian state of Queensland. But some of them lie just off the coast of New Guinea.

In 1885, John Douglas was appointed as Government Resident Magistrate residing on Thursday Island. He made periodic tours of all the islands and was known to all the indigenous groups. He established the system under which the hereditary Elder of each island was installed as chief magistrate, supporting the local traditional system. He also established Native Police, but the only island on which the Native Police were armed was Saibai. There they were provided with Snider carbines to repel the attacks of the Marind-anim (formerly known as Tugeri), the headhunters who raided the islands from their territory on the New Guinea coast.

In 1898–1899, the Cambridge Anthropological Expedition led by Alfred Cort Haddon visited the Torres Strait Islands. Among its members was W. H. R. Rivers, who later gained notability for his work in psychology and treating officers in the Great War. They collected and took about 2000 cultural artefacts, ostensibly to save them from destruction by missionaries. But all of the artefacts collected by Samuel Macfarlane were sold in London, mostly to European museums.

=== 20th century to present ===
In 1904, the peoples of the Torres Strait Islands were made subject to the Aboriginals Protection and Restriction of the Sale of Opium Act 1897, which gave substantial powers to the Queensland government in placing legal restrictions on First Nations peoples and on their land use.

In 1899, John Douglas had initiated a process of electing island councils, intended to loosen the power of missionaries in the islands. They had become powerful by default because the government did not have resources to administer the territory. In the Western islands, where the traditional lifestyle was semi-nomadic, the council system continued to thrive.

During World War II, many Torres Strait Islanders served in the Torres Strait Light Infantry Battalion of the Australian Army. It is the only Australian Army unit to have been formed out of indigenous Australians.

From 1960 to 1973, Margaret Lawrie captured some of the Torres Strait Islander people's culture by recording their recounting of local myths and legends. Her anthropological work, stored at the State Library of Queensland, has recently been recognised and registered with the Australian UNESCO Memory of the World Programme.

The proximity of the islands to Papua New Guinea became an issue when the territory started moving to gain independence from Australia, which it gained in 1975. The Papua New Guinea government objected to the position of the border close to the New Guinean mainland, and the subsequent complete control that Australia exercised over the waters of the strait. The Torres Strait Islanders opposed being separated from Australia and insisted on no change to the border. The Australian Federal government wished to cede the northern islands to appease Papua New Guinea, but were opposed by the Queensland government and Queensland Premier Sir Joh Bjelke-Petersen.

Under the Torres Strait Treaty of 1978 the islands and their inhabitants remained Australian, but the maritime boundary between Australia and Papua New Guinea was defined as running through the centre of the strait. In practice the two countries co-operate closely in the management of the strait's resources.

In 1982, Eddie Mabo and four other Torres Strait Islander people from Mer (Murray Island) started legal proceedings to establish their traditional land ownership. Because Mabo was the first-named plaintiff, it became known as the Mabo Case. In 1992, after ten years of hearings before the Queensland Supreme Court and the High Court of Australia, the latter court found that the Mer people had owned their land prior to annexation by Queensland. This ruling overturned the long-established legal doctrine of terra nullius ("no-one's land"), which held that native title over Crown land in Australia had been extinguished at the time of annexation. The ruling thus has had far-reaching significance for the land claims of both Torres Strait Islanders and Australian Aboriginal people. Its effects are still being felt in the 21st century, as indigenous communities establish claims to their traditional lands under the Native Title Act of 1993.

On 1 July 1994, the Torres Strait Regional Authority (TSRA) was created. In March 2008, fifteen Torres Strait Islander Councils were amalgamated into a single body to form a Torres Strait Island Regional Council, or Torres Strait Island Region, created by the Queensland Government in the interest of financial viability, and accountability and transparency of local governments throughout the State. It is administered from Thursday Island, but Thursday, Horn Island, Prince of Wales Island and many others are under the Shire of Torres council.

In the 2016 census, the population of the Torres Strait Islands was 4,514, of whom 4,144 (91.8%) were Torres Strait Islanders. These inhabitants live on only 14 of the 274 islands. For comparison, people identifying themselves as of Torres Strait Islander descent living in the whole of Australia numbered 32,345, while those of both Torres Strait Islander and Aboriginal descent numbered a further 26,767.

== Geography ==
Torres Strait Islands

The islands span an area of some 48,000 km^{2} (19,000 sq mi). The strait from Cape York to New Guinea has a width of approximately 150 kilometres (93 mi) at its narrowest point; the islands lie scattered in between, extending some 200 to 300 kilometres (120 to 190 mi) from furthest east to furthest west. The total land area of the islands comprises 566 km^{2} (219 sq mi). 21,784 hectares (53,830 acres) of land are used for agricultural purposes.

The Torres Strait itself was previously part of a land bridge known as the Arafura Plain which connected the present-day Australian continent with New Guinea (in a single landmass called Sahul, Meganesia, Australia-New Guinea). This land bridge was most recently submerged by rising sea levels at the end of the last ice-age glaciation approximately 12,000 years ago, forming the Strait which now connects the Arafura and Coral seas. Many of the western Torres Strait Islands are the remaining peaks of this land bridge which were not completely submerged when the ocean levels rose.

The islands and their surrounding waters and reefs provide a highly diverse set of land and marine ecosystems, with niches for many rare or unique species. Saltwater crocodiles inhabit the islands along with neighbouring areas of Queensland and Papua New Guinea. Marine animals of the islands include dugongs (an endangered species of sea mammal widely found throughout the Indian Ocean and tropical Western Pacific, including Papua-New Guinean and Australian waters), as well as green, ridley, hawksbill and flatback sea turtles.

The Torres Strait Islands may be grouped into five distinct clusters, which exhibit differences of geology and formation as well as location. The Torres Strait provides a habitat for numerous birds, including the Torresian imperial-pigeon, which is seen as the iconic national emblem to the islanders.

These islands are also a distinct physiographic section of the larger Cape York Platform province, which in turn is part of the larger East Australian Cordillera physiographic region.

=== Top Western islands (Gudaw Maluligal Nation) ===
The islands in this cluster lie very close to the southwestern coastline of New Guinea (the closest is less than 4 kilometres (2.5 mi) offshore). Saibai (one of the largest of the Torres Strait Islands) and Boigu (one of the Talbot Islands) are low-lying islands which were formed by deposition of sediments and mud from New Guinean rivers into the Strait accumulating on decayed coral platforms. Vegetation on these islands mainly consists of mangrove swamps, and they are prone to flooding.

The other main island in this group, Dauan (Mt Cornwallis), is a smaller island with steep hills, composed largely of granite. This island actually represents the northernmost extent of the Great Dividing Range, the extensive series of mountain ranges which runs along almost the entire eastern coastline of Australia. This peak became an island as the ocean levels rose at the end of the last ice age.

The isolated and uninhabited Deliverance Island is 67 kilometres (42 mi) west of Boigu, the nearest of the Top Western islands.

=== Near Western islands (Maluligal Nation) ===
The islands in this cluster lie south of the Strait's midway point, and are also largely high granite hills with mounds of basaltic outcrops, formed from old peaks of the now submerged land bridge. Moa (Banks Island) is the second-largest in the Torres Strait, and Badu (Mulgrave Island) is slightly smaller and fringed with extensive mangrove swamps. Other smaller islands include Mabuiag, Pulu and further to the east Naghir (correct form Nagi, aka Mount Ernest Island). Culturally this was the most complex part of Torres Strait, containing three of the four groupings/dialects of the Western-central Islanders, Nagi being culturally/linguistically a Central Island (Kulkalaig territory, specifically part of Waraber tribal waters), Moa is part of the Muwalaig-Italaig-Kaiwalaig [Kauraraig/Kaurareg] tribal areas, with two groups, the Italaig of the south, and the Muwalaig of the north. Many Kauraraig also live there, having been forcibly moved there in 1922–1923. Badu and Mabuiag are the Maluigal Deep Sea People.

=== Inner islands (Kaiwalagal Kawrareg Aboriginal Nation) ===
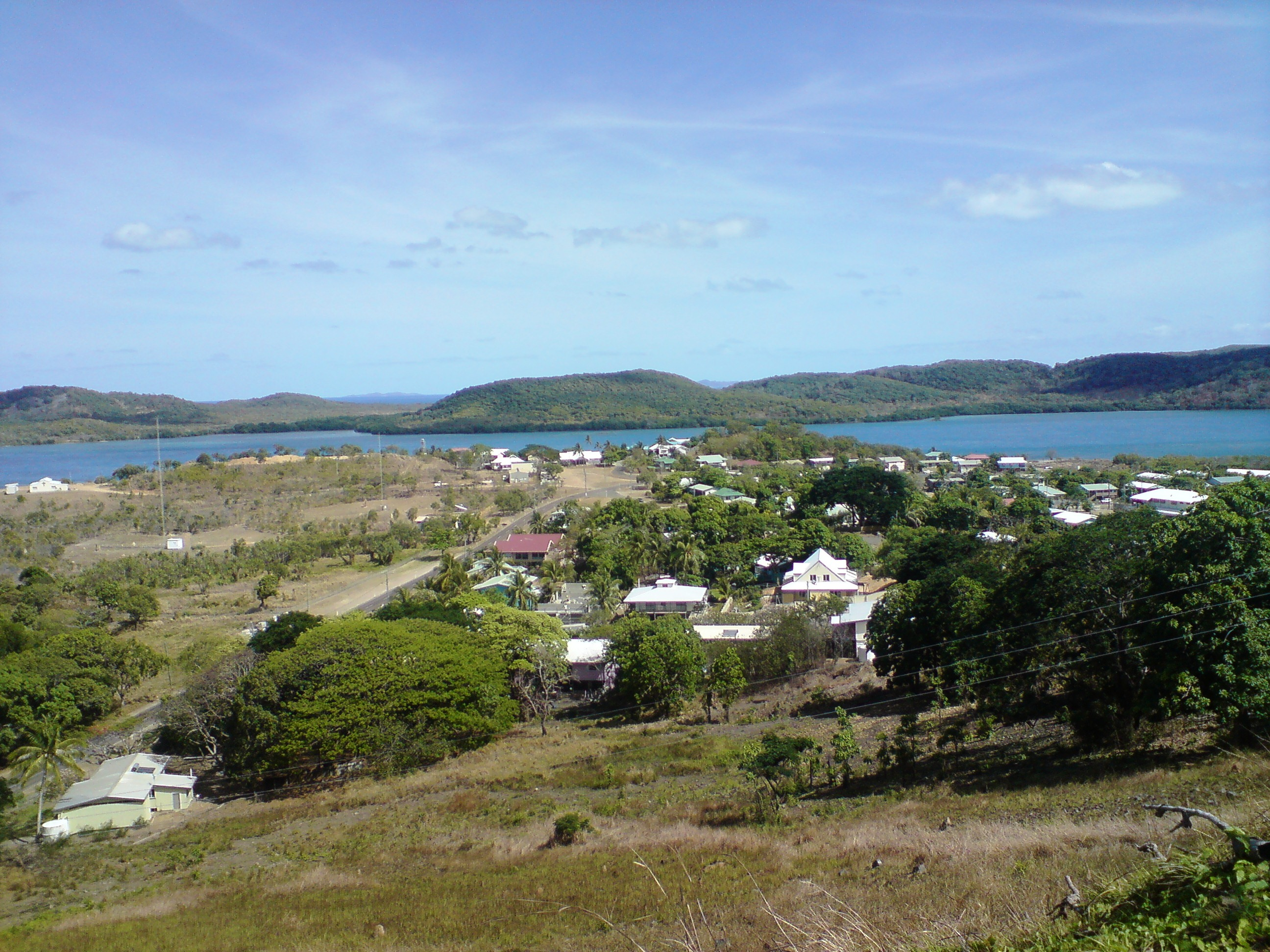
The township of Thursday Island

These islands, also known as the Thursday Island group, lie closest to Cape York Peninsula, and their topography and geological history is very similar. Muralag (Prince of Wales Island) is the largest of the Strait's islands, and forms the centre of this closely grouped cluster. The much smaller Waiben Thursday Island is the region's administrative centre and most heavily populated. Several of these islands have permanent freshwater springs, and some were also mined for gold in the late 19th and early 20th centuries. Because of their proximity to the Australian mainland, they have also been centres of pearling and fishing industries. Nurupai Horn Island holds the region's airport, and as a result is something of an entrepôt with inhabitants drawn from many other communities. Kiriri (Hammond Island) is the other permanently settled island of this group; Tuined (Possession Island) is noted for Lt. James Cook's landing there in 1770. Moa in the Near Western group is culturally and linguistically speaking part of this group.

=== Central islands (Kulkalgal Nation) ===
This cluster is more widely distributed in the middle of Torres Strait, consisting of many small sandy cays surrounded by coral reefs, similar to those found in the nearby Great Barrier Reef. The more northerly islands in this group however, such as Gerbar (Two Brothers) and Iama (Yam Island), are high basaltic outcrops, not cays. Nagi is a culturo-linguistic part of this group, and also has high basaltic outcropping. The low-lying inhabited coral cays, such as Poruma (Coconut Island), Warraber Island and Masig (Yorke Island) are mostly less than 2 to 3 kilometres (1.2–1.9 miles) long, and no wider than 800 metres (2,600 feet). Several have had problems with saltwater intrusion.

=== Eastern islands (Kemer Kemer Meriam Nation) ===
The islands of this group (principally Mer (Murray Island), Dauar and Waier, with Erub Island and Stephen Island (Ugar) further north) are formed differently from the rest. They are volcanic in origin, the peaks of volcanoes which were active in Pleistocene times. Consequently, their hillsides have rich and fertile red volcanic soils, and are thickly vegetated. The easternmost of these are less than 20 kilometres (12 mi) from the northern extension of the Great Barrier Reef.

== Administration ==
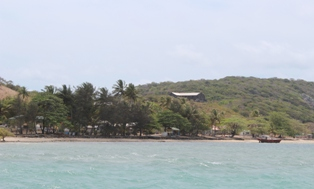
Hammond Island, Torres Strait

=== Regional Authority ===
The Torres Strait Regional Authority (TSRA), an Australian Commonwealth statutory authority created in 1994, exercises governance over the islands. The TSRA has an elected board comprising 20 representatives from the Torres Strait Islander and Aboriginal communities resident in the Torres Strait region.

One representative per established local community wins election to the board under the Queensland Community Services (Torres Strait) Act 1984 and Division 5 of the ATSIC Act 1989. The TSRA itself falls under the portfolio responsibilities of the Australian Government Department of the Prime Minister and Cabinet (previously under the Department of Families, Community Services and Indigenous Affairs). Thursday Island functions as the administrative centre of the islands.

The TSRA now represents the local communities at both Commonwealth and State levels; previously, State representation operated via a Queensland statutory authority called the Island Coordinating Council (ICC). The Torres Strait Island Region local government area superseded the ICC in March 2008.

In March 2008, fifteen Torres Strait Islander Councils were amalgamated into a single body to form a Torres Strait Island Regional Council, or Torres Strait Island Region, created by the Queensland Government in the interest of financial viability, and accountability and transparency of local Governments throughout the State. It is administered from Thursday Island, but Thursday, Horn Island, Prince of Wales Island and many others are under the Shire of Torres council.

=== Local government ===
At the local level, there are two authorities. One is the Shire of Torres, which governs several islands and portions of Cape York Peninsula and operates as a Queensland local government area.

The other is the Torres Strait Island Region, created in 2008, which embodies 15 former island councils. These former councils had been previously relinquished by the Queensland Government to specific Islander and Aboriginal Councils under the provisions of the Community Services (Torres Strait) Act 1984 and the Community Services (Aboriginal) Act 1984), consisting of:

- Badu Island Council
- Bamaga Island Council
- Boigu Island Council
- Dauan Island Council
- Erub Island Council
- Hammond Island Council
- Iama Island Council
- Kubin Island Council
- Mabuiag Island Council
- Mer Island Council
- Poruma Island Council
- Saibai Island Council
- Seisia Island Council
- St Pauls Island Council
- St Patrick Island council
- Ugar Island Council
- Warraber Island Council
- Yorke Island Council

== Localities ==
This shows the localities of the Torres Strait Islands in alphabetical order.

Locality	Type	Population (2016 Census)	Population Density	
Locality	Type	Population (2016 Census)	per km^{2}	per sq mi
Badu Island	Locality	813	8.50	3.28
Boigu Island	Town	271	3.0	1.2
Coconut Island	Town	167	-	-
Darnley Island	Town	328	57.5	22.2
Dauan Island	Town	191	56.2	21.7
Friday Island	Locality	20	-	-
Horn Island	Town	531	10	3.9
Keriri Island	Locality	268	16.96	6.55
Mabuiag Island	Town	210	33.3	12.9
Masig Island	Locality	270	180	69
Moa Island	Locality	448	2.632	1.016
Murray Island	Town	453	-	-
Packe Island	Locality	10	-	-
Prince of Wales	Locality	109	0.2128	0.0822
Saibai Island	Town	465	4.3	1.7
Stephens Island	Locality	72	-	-
Thursday Island	Town	2,938	839	324
Warraber Islet	Locality	245	350	140
Yam Island	Locality	319	168	65

== Independence movement ==
Politicians who have declared support for independence, include Bob Katter and former Queensland Premier Anna Bligh, who in August 2011 wrote to Prime Minister Julia Gillard in support of Torres Strait Islands independence from Australia; Prime Minister Gillard said in October 2011 "her government will respectfully consider the Torres Strait's request for self-government". Other figures who have supported independence include Australian Indigenous rights campaigner Eddie Mabo.

== Languages ==
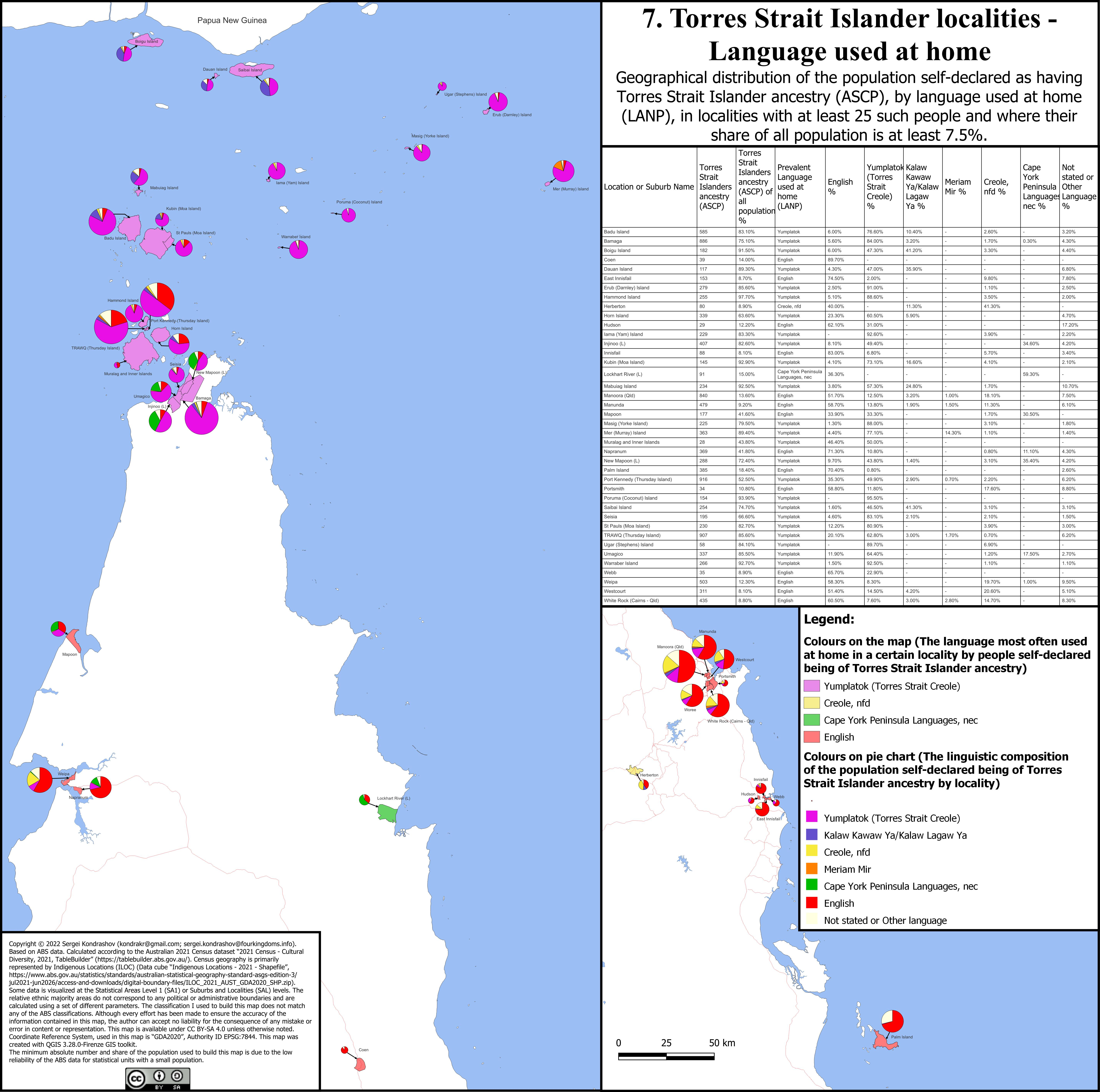
Languages used at home by Torres Strait Islanders in localities with significant share of Torres Strait islander population.

Torres Strait Islander peoples, the indigenous peoples of the islands, are predominantly Melanesians, culturally most akin to the coastal peoples of Papua New Guinea. Thus, they are regarded as being distinct from Aboriginal peoples of Australia and are generally referred to separately, despite ongoing historical trade and inter-marriage with mainland Aboriginal people. There are also two Torres Strait Islander communities on the nearby coast of the mainland, Bamaga and Seisia.

According to the Torres Strait Treaty, residents of Papua New Guinea are permitted to visit the Torres Strait Islands for traditional purposes.

There are three languages spoken on the islands. The two indigenous languages are the Western-Central Torres Strait Language (called by various names, including Kalaw Lagaw Ya, Kalaw Kawaw Ya, Kulkalgau Ya and Kaiwaligau Ya), and the Eastern Torres Language Meriam Mir.

Yumplatok (also known as Torres Strait Creole and Broken) is a contemporary Torres Strait Island language spoken in the Torres Strait. The contact with missionaries, traders and other English speakers since the 19th century led to the development of a pidgin language. It developed more fully as a creole language, with its own distinctive sound system, grammar, vocabulary, usage and meaning. Torres Strait Creole is spoken by most Torres Strait Islanders and is a mixture of Standard Australian English and traditional indigenous languages. It is an English-based creole; however, each island has its own version of creole. Torres Strait Creole is also spoken on the Australian mainland, including in the Northern Peninsula Area Region and coastal communities such as Cairns, Townsville, Mackay, Rockhampton and Brisbane.

== Climate change ==
The Torres Strait Islands are threatened by rising sea levels, especially those islands which do not rise more than one metre (3.3 feet) above sea level. Storm surges and high tides pose the greatest danger. Other developing problems include erosion, property damage, drinking water contamination and the unearthing of the dead. As of June 2010, there were no relocation strategies in place for Torres Strait Islanders. By 2021, at least one freshwater well had turned to salt water.

In early 2020, it was reported that Warraber is particularly threatened by rising sea levels, and coastal defences have been built on many of the beaches on the island. The Intergovernmental Panel on Climate Change (IPCC) has predicted that by 2100, tides will rise 30–110 cm (12–43 in), depending on the timing and level of cuts to carbon emissions. Several of the smaller islands in the group are also under threat. Construction of sea walls has begun on Boigu Island, and Masig Island is next in line.

=== Torres Strait 8 ===
A group of eight people from the small, low-lying islands of Boigu, Poruma, Warraber and Masig, who became known as the Torres Strait 8, lodged a complaint against the Australian Government with the UN Human Rights Committee in May 2019, based on the claim that their human rights were being violated by the government's lack of efforts to protect the people of the Strait from the effects of climate change. Their complaint has been supported by the current and previous UN Special Rapporteur on Human Rights and the Environment, David Boyd and John Knox respectively. The group is also seeking an opinion from the International Court of Justice as to whether they would be eligible to seek compensation from countries or large companies for losses brought about by climate change.

In 2020 the Torres Strait 8 were recognised as one of ten "Human Rights Heroes" in the Human Rights Awards, in a special category replacing the usual awards.

In September 2022, the UN Human Rights Committee gave its response to the Torres Strait 8. It concluded that Australia had violated two of three human rights described in the International Covenant on Civil and Political Rights, a treaty signed in 1966 by 173 member states of the UN, including Australia. The violated rights are "the right to enjoy their culture" and "[to] be free from arbitrary interferences with their private life, family and home". The committee did not find that their right to life had been violated. There is no means by which to enforce the finding, but states generally comply. While the Morrison government had called for dismissal of the complaint, the Albanese government (since early 2022) was committed to working with Torres Strait Islanders on climate change. The committee called on the government to compensate the islanders for the harm already inflicted, "consult the community on their needs and take action to secure their safety".

== Disease control ==
The banana plant leaf disease black sigatoka, the major banana disease worldwide, is endemic to Papua New Guinea and the Torres Strait Islands. Occasional infections have been discovered on Cape York Peninsula but they have been successfully halted with eradication programs. The disease most likely appeared on the mainland via plant material from the Torres Strait Islands.

== Music ==
The music of the Torres Strait is principally vocal accompanied by instruments. The introduction of Christianity through the London Missionary Society, beginning in 1871, had a profound influence, but before that time the musical culture reflected the cultural and geographic diversity of the Strait.

== See also ==
- List of Torres Strait Islands
- Pearl hunting § Australia
- Torres Strait Islanders
