= Dauan Island =

- Town
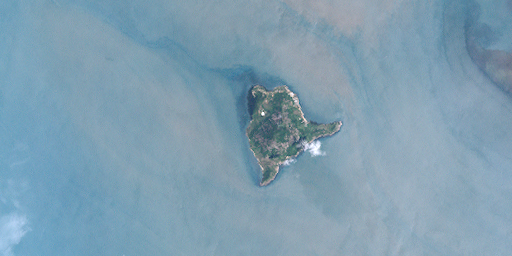
- Aerial view of Dauan Island, 2011

- Interactive map of Dauan Island
- Coordinates: 9.4140°S 142.5394°E
- Country: Australia
- State: Queensland
- LGA: Torres Strait Island Region

Government
  - State electorate: Cook
  - Federal division: Leichhardt

Area
  - Total: 3.4 km^{2} (1.3 sq mi)

Population
  - Total: 131 (2021 census locality)
  - Density: 38.5/km^{2} (99.8/sq mi)
- Time zone: UTC+10:00 (AEST)
- Postcode: 4875

Dauan Island is an island in the Torres Strait, Queensland, Australia; it is also known as Cornwallis Island. Dauan Island is also a town and locality in the Torres Strait Island Region, Queensland, Australia. In the 2021 census, the locality of Dauan Island had a population of 131 people.

== Geography ==
Dauan Island is approximately 2.85 kilometres (1.77 mi) long and 2.7 kilometres (1.7 mi) wide. It is 5 kilometres (3.1 mi) west of Sabai Island and 11 kilometres (6.8 mi) south of Papua New Guinea.

Dauan forms part of the North Western Islands group of the Torres Strait. Boigu and Saibai Islands make up the remainder of the group. The people of all three islands consider themselves one people.

The north-western island group is located close to the Papua New Guinea border and forms the most northern point of Australia's territory. Situated on a narrow coastal strip, Dauan is well known throughout the Torres Strait for its freshwater permanent springs, fertile soil and steep hills. The island is less commonly known by its English name of Cornwallis, named after Mount Cornwallis, Queensland’s most northerly granite peak.

Dauan, as it is known by its traditional owners the Dauanalgal (Dow-a-nal-gal) people, is considered to be part of the Great Dividing Range. Strong kinship and trade ties continue to exist between the people of Dauan, Boigu and Saibai and coastal Papuan communities.

== History ==
Kalaw Kawaw Ya (also known as Kalau Kawau Ya, KKY) is one of the languages of the Torres Strait. Kalaw Kawaw Ya is the traditional language owned by the Top Western islands of the Torres Strait. The Kalaw Kawaw Ya language region includes the landscape within the local government boundaries of the Shire of Torres.

=== European contact ===
Captain William Bligh, in charge of the British Navy ships Providence and Assistant, visited Torres Strait in 1792 and mapped the main reefs and channels. Bligh named the highest hill on the island Mount Cornwallis. Because of its distance from the main sea passages in Torres Strait, few Europeans had visited Dauan prior to the 1860s.

Torres Strait Islanders refer to the arrival of the London Missionary Society (LMS) on 1 July 1871 as the "Coming of the Light". After visiting Erub and Tudu, missionaries led by the Reverend Samuel McFarlane and the Reverend A W Murray travelled to Dauan on 6 July 1871. Nadai, the leader of Dauan, met with the missionaries and allowed them to start a mission on the island. Two South Sea Islander lay pastors, Josaia and Sivene, were appointed to work as missionary teachers at Dauan and Saibai. LMS missionaries revisited Dauan and Saibai in 1872, and found that Josaia and Sivene had been accepted by the Islanders and given land by the local chiefs.

In the 1860s, beche-de-mer (sea cucumber) and pearling boats began working the reefs of Torres Strait. Pearling bases were never established on Dauan, but in the 1870s, European pearl and beche-de-mer operators began recruiting men from the North Western Islands to work on their luggers.

From the late 1870s onwards, the coastal communities of Papua and the islands of Dauan, Boigu and Saibai were raided by warriors of the Marind-Anim or Tugeri people from Dutch-controlled West Papua. In 1881, the government vessel known as Pearl visited Dauan and found that the entire population of Boigu had taken shelter on the island from Marind Anim raiding parties who had killed 11 Islanders and burned the villages on Boigu.

Dauan was often used as a place of sanctuary by the people of Boigu and Saibai, as it was surrounded by reefs and strong currents that were difficult for the raiders to negotiate in their canoes. Government officials Henry Chester and Frank Jardine lead a punitive expedition against the raiders but were unable to find them. Chester left a quantity of firearms with the people of Boigu for their self-defence. In 1896, a retaliatory expedition led by British officials based in Daru in West Papua diminished the threat of the Marind-Anim, but raids on Dauan, Boigu, Saibai and Papua continued well into the 1920s.

In 1872, the Queensland Government sought to extend its jurisdiction and requested the support of the British Government. Letters patent were issued by the British Government in 1872 creating a new colony, which encompassed all islands within a 60 nautical mile radius of the coast of Queensland. This boundary was further extended by the Queensland Coast Islands Act 1879 and now included the islands of Boigu, Erub, Mer and Saibai, which lay beyond the previous 60 nautical mile limit. The new legislation enabled the Queensland Government to control and regulate bases for the beche-de-mer and pearling industries which had previously operated outside its jurisdiction.

Around 1900, a member of the London Missionary Society, Reverend Walker, established a philanthropic business scheme named Papuan Industries Limited. This business encouraged Islander communities to cooperatively rent or purchase their own pearl luggers or "company boats". The boats were used to harvest pearl shells and beche-de-mer, which were sold and distributed by the company. The people of Dauan had purchased their first company boat, Papua, by 1911. Company boats provided Islanders with income and a sense of community pride and also improved transport and communication between the islands.

In November 1912, the Queensland Government officially gazetted 800 acres of land on Dauan as an Aboriginal reserve. Many other Torres Strait Islands were gazetted as Aboriginal reserves at this time.

Shortages of food on Dauan and Saibai were mentioned in a government report dating from 1912. The report also stated that only 12 to 15 people were living at Dauan permanently. By 1918, a Protector of Aboriginals had been appointed to Thursday Island and, during the 1920s and 1930s, racial legislation was strictly applied to Torres Strait Islanders.

In the 1930s, a mission school was established.

In 1936, around 70% of the Torres Strait Islander workforce went on strike in the first organised challenge against government authority made by Torres Strait Islanders. The nine-month strike was an expression of Islanders’ anger and resentment at the increasing government control of their livelihood. The strike was a protest against government interference in wages, trade and commerce and called for the lifting of evening curfews, the removal of the permit system for inter-island travel, and the recognition of the Islanders’ right to recruit their own boat crews.

The strike produced a number of significant reforms and innovations. Unpopular local Protector J D McLean was removed and replaced by Cornelius O'Leary, who established a system of regular consultations with elected Islander council representatives. The new island councils were given a degree of autonomy, including control over local island police and courts.

On 23 August 1937, O'Leary convened the first Inter Islander Councillors Conference at Masig. Representatives from 14 Torres Strait communities attended. Mau and Anau represented Dauan at the conference. After lengthy discussions, unpopular bylaws, including the evening curfews, were cancelled and a new code of local representation was agreed upon.

In 1939 the Queensland Government passed the Torres Strait Islanders Act 1939, which incorporated many of the recommendations discussed at the conference. The Act officially recognised Torres Strait Islanders as a separate people from Aboriginal Australians.

During World War II, the Australian Government recruited Torres Strait Islander men to serve in the armed forces. Enlisted men from Dauan and other island communities formed the Torres Strait Light Infantry. While the Torres Strait Light Infantry were respected as soldiers, they only received one third of the pay given to white Australian servicemen. On 31 December 1943, members of the Torres Strait Light Infantry went on strike calling for equal pay and equal rights for all soldiers. The Australian Government agreed to increase their pay to two thirds the level received by white servicemen. Full back pay was offered in compensation to the Torres Strait servicemen by the Australian Government in the 1980s. In the post-war period, the pearling industry declined across Torres Strait, and Islanders were permitted to work and settle on Thursday Island and the Australian mainland.

After gaining its independence from Australia in 1975, Papua New Guinea asserted its right to the islands and waters of the Torres Straits. In December 1978, a treaty was signed by the Australian and Papua New Guinea governments that described the boundaries between the two countries and the use of the sea area by both parties. Commencing in February 1985, the Torres Strait Treaty, contains special provision for free movement (without passports or visas) between both countries. Free movement between communities applies to traditional activities such as fishing, trading and family gatherings which occur in a specifically created Protected Zone and nearby areas.

On 29 January 1985, the Queensland Government established Dauan Island State School. In 2007 the Tagai State College was established and Dauan Island State School became the Dauan Island Campus of the Tagai State College.

On 30 March 1985, the Dauan community elected three councillors to constitute an autonomous Dauan Island Council established under the Community Services (Torres Strait) Act 1984. The Act conferred local government-type powers and responsibilities upon Torres Strait Islander councils and the council area, previously an Aboriginal reserve held by the Queensland Government, was transferred on 21 October 1985 to the trusteeship of the council under a Deed of Grant in Trust.

In 2007, the Local Government Reform Commission recommended that the 15 Torres Strait Island councils be abolished and the Torres Strait Island Regional Council be established in their place. In elections conducted under the Local Government Act 1993 on 15 March 2008, members of the 15 communities comprising the Torres Strait Island Regional Council local government area each voted for a local councillor and a mayor to constitute a council consisting of 15 councillors plus a mayor.

== Demographics ==
In the 2016 census, the locality of Dauan Island had a population of 191 people.

In the 2021 census, the locality of Dauan Island had a population of 131 people.

== Facilities ==
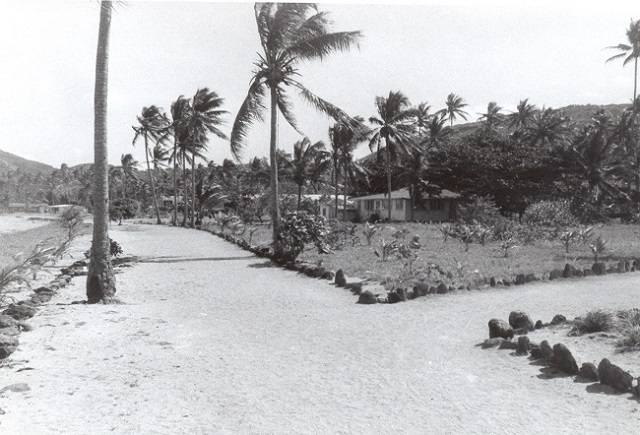
Roads and landscape on Dauan Island

Torres Strait Island Regional Council operate an Indigenous Knowledge Centre (IKC) at Main Street. Opened on 30 June 2006, partnered with the State Library of Queensland, the IKC delivers a library service for community members, and a range of projects, including Taking IT On, Remote Indigenous Public Internet Access (RIPIA), Culture Love and Deadly Digital Communities.

Culture Love was a project delivered through a partnership between Arts Queensland, the State Library of Queensland, and respective shire and regional councils across Queensland. The partnership commenced in 2009 and continued for many years. Projects were delivered during school holidays and covered themes such as art, language, music to capture and enhance Aboriginal and Torres Strait Islander culture and history. At Dauan, Culture Love took place from 2 to 6 July 2013, for community members, children and young people, Elders, local artists, knowledge experts and visiting arts workers to celebrate culture through the arts. At the end of the week-long project, an interactive bilingual book, called The Coming of the Light Dauan Island was created using original artwork. The story is presented in both Kala Kawaw Ya (KKY) and English.

== Education ==
Dauan Island Campus is a primary (early childhood to Grade 6) campus of Tagai State College in Main Street (9.4136°S 142.5396°E). The college has its headquarters on Thursday Island. In 2016, the Dauan campus of the Tagai State College had an enrolment of 18 students in early years and 21 students in middle years (total 39 students).

== Religion ==
In 2018, a parish on Dauan Island became the first in the Torres Strait to enter the Personal Ordinariate of Our Lady of the Southern Cross, a structure within the Catholic Church for former Anglicans. A former priest and vicar-general of the Church of Torres Strait, Fr G.W. Barnier OLSC was ordained as a Catholic deacon (24 April 2013) and priest two days later on 26 April 2013 by James Foley, Bishop of Cairns.
