= Aedes stoneorum =

Scientific classification
- Kingdom: Animalia
- Phylum: Arthropoda
- Class: Insecta
- Order: Diptera
- Family: Culicidae
- Genus: Aedes
- Species: A. stoneorum

Binomial name
- Aedes stoneorum Marks, 1977

Species of mosquito

Aedes (Macleaya) stoneorum is a species of mosquito in the genus Aedes. It is found in open woodland communities and are known to bite humans between 7:30 pm and 11:00 pm. They are predominantly found between February and April, and breed in tree holes or artificial containers such as tires or rainwater tanks. The type specimen was collected on Moa (Banks) Island in North Queensland.

== Description ==
The female holotype of this species has wings of 2.4 mm in length, antennae of 1.8 mm, an abdomen of 2 mm, and femora and tibiae of 1.4 mm and 1.7 mm respectively. The thorax of A. stoneorum is dark brown with white bands. Legs are black with some white patches, and same for the abdomen. The wings are black with two small white patches.

== Etymology ==
A. stoneorum is named after Alan Stone and his wife, Louise, for his contributions and help in the Diptera and Culicidae fields.
