= Masig Island, Queensland =

Masig Island
- Suburb
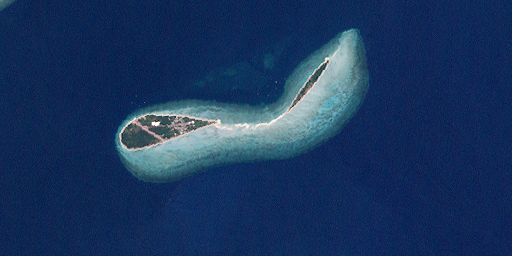
- Masig Island (left) and Kodall Island (right)

- Interactive map of Masig Island
- Coordinates: 9.7527°S 143.4108°E
- Country: Australia
- State: Queensland
- LGA: Torres Strait Island Region

Government
  - State electorate: Cook
  - Federal division: Leichhardt

Area
  - Total: 1.5 km^{2} (0.58 sq mi)

Population
  - Total: 283 (2021 census)
  - Density: 189/km^{2} (489/sq mi)
- Time zone: UTC+10:00 (AEST)
Suburbs around Masig Island
Coral Sea	Coral Sea	Coral Sea
Coral Sea	Masig Island	Coral Sea
Coral Sea	Coral Sea	Coral Sea

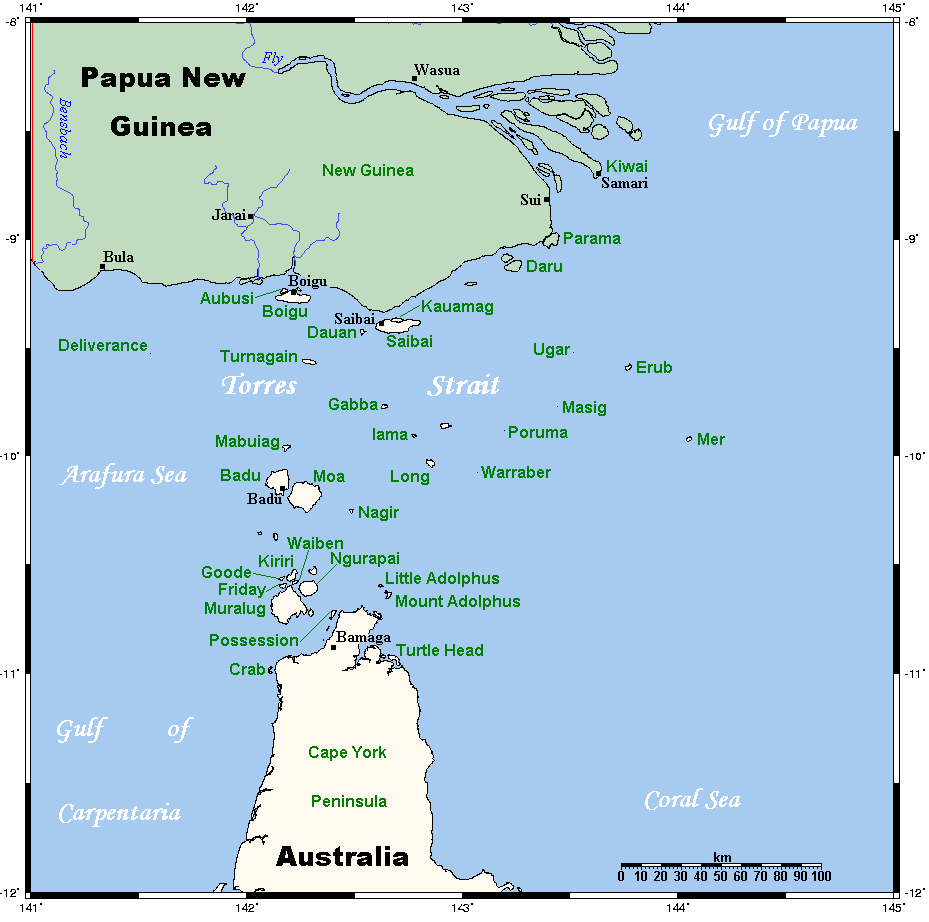
A map of the Torres Strait Islands showing Masig in the north-eastern waters of Torres Strait

Masig Island, also known as Yorke Island, is an island and locality in the Torres Strait Island Region, Queensland, Australia. In the 2021 census, Masig Island had a population of 283 people.

The name Masig is from the Kalau Lagau Ya language for this coral cay island of the Torres Strait Islands archipelago, situated in the eastern area of the central island group in the Torres Strait, at the top end of the Great Barrier Reef and northeast of the tip of Cape York Peninsula in Queensland, Australia. The Masigalgal people, of the Kulkulgal nation of the Central Torres Strait, are recognised as the traditional owners of Masig. They are of Melanesian origin and had followed traditional patterns of hunting, fishing, agriculture and trade for many thousands of years prior to contact with the first European visitors to the region. The Queensland Government moved the people of Aureed to Masig after it was declared an Aboriginal reserve. Luggers owned by Masig families continued to operate until the pearling and shell industry collapsed in the 1960s. The people then shifted successfully into commercial mackerel fishing, prawning and crayfishing. A highly profitable fish factory has operated on the island since the late 1970s, freezing the catch and air freighting it to southern markets.

Masig Island is one of the Yorke Islands (9.7446°S 143.4295°E), the other being Kodall Island (9.7400°S 143.4469°E).

== Geography ==
Masig/Yorke Island lies northeast of Coconut/Poruma Island in the central island group and southwest of Stephens/Ugar Island, and Darnley/Erub Island, and northwest of Murray/Mer Island in the eastern island group. It is about 160 kilometres (99 mi) northeast of Thursday Island.

The island is about 2.7 kilometres (1.7 mi) long and 0.8 kilometres (2,600 ft) at its widest point, a very small low-lying coral cay. The topography is very flat, with ground level generally less than 3 metres (9.8 ft) above sea level. More than half the island is covered in undisturbed vegetation, including dense trees on the eastern and western parts of the Island.

Masig Island is near the following sea passages:

- Moon Passage to the north-west of the island (9.5561°S 143.1286°E)
- Great North East Channel to the north-west (9.6250°S 143.3531°E)
- Cumberland Passage to the south-east (10.0288°S 143.5499°E)
- Hibernia Passage to the south-east (10.0965°S 143.6368°E)

The Bourke Isles are to the south of Masig Island (9.8556°S 143.5058°E).

== History ==
The Masigalgal people, of the Kulkulgal nation of the Central Torres Strait, are recognised as the traditional owners of Masig.

The Torres Strait Islander people of Masig are of Melanesian origin and had followed traditional patterns of hunting, fishing, agriculture and trade for many thousands of years prior to contact with the first European visitors to the region. They are skilled navigators with a detailed knowledge of the reefs and have always occupied a central position in the Straits trading networks.

In September 1792, Captain William Bligh, in charge of the British Navy ships Providence and Assistant, visited Torres Strait and mapped the main reefs and channels.

In the 1860s, beche-de-mer (sea cucumber) and pearling boats began working the reefs of Torres Strait. William Banner established a beche-de-mer station at Warrior Island in 1863 and employed Islander men from Masig to work on his boats as divers and crew.

Before the arrival of teachers from the London Missionary Society in the 1870s, Masig was attracting a diverse community of immigrants, some brought by the pearl and trochus shell industry.

In 1872, the Queensland Government sought to extend its jurisdiction and requested the support of the British Government. Letters Patent were issued by the British Government in 1872 creating a new boundary for the colony which encompassed all islands within a 60 nautical mile radius of the coast of Queensland. This boundary was further extended by the Queensland Coast Islands Act 1879 (Qld) and included the islands of Boigu, Erub, Mer and Saibai, which lay beyond the previous 60 nautical mile limit. The new legislation enabled the Queensland Government to control and regulate bases for the beche-de-mer and pearling industries, which previously had operated outside its jurisdiction.

In 1871, an American whaler from Boston named Edward (Ned) Mosby arrived in Torres Strait. He was commonly known as "Yankee Ned". After working for Frank Jardine on Nagir Island, Edward Mosby established a beche-de-mer station on Yorke in the late 1870s, with his business partner Jack Walker. Mosby and Walker leased half the island from the Queensland Government for their business operations.

Captain Charles Pennefather, in charge of the government survey vessel Pearl, visited Masig in September 1882. Mosby and Walker lodged a complaint with Pennefather against the crew of the beche-de-mer operator Captain Walton, for cutting down Wongai fruit trees on the island for fuel. Steam powered ships often stopped at Masig to collect supplies of firewood, resulting in deforestation on the Island.

Torres Strait Islanders refer to the arrival of London Missionary Society (LMS) missionaries in July 1871 as the " Coming of the Light".The Reverend A W Murray and William Wyatt Gill were the first LMS missionaries to visit Masig in 1872. Around 1900, the LMS missionary the Reverend Walker established a philanthropic business scheme named Papuan Industries Limited. This company encouraged Islander communities to co-operatively rent or purchase their own pearl luggers or "company boats". The company boats, were used to harvest pearl shells and beche-de-mer, which was sold and distributed by the company.

The people of Masig purchased their first company boats around 1905. These boats provided Islanders with income, a sense of community pride and also improved transport and communication between the islands. ‘Yankee,’ Ned Mosby's son, also operated a number of pearl luggers from Masig, including the Yano and Nancy.

In November 1912, the Queensland Government officially gazetted 320 acres of land on Masig as an Aboriginal reserve. Many other Torres Strait Islands were gazetted as Aboriginal reserves at the same time. The Government moved the people of Aureed to Masig after this.

A government school was established on the island in 1912. By 1918, a Protector of Aboriginals had been appointed to Thursday Island and, during the 1920s and 1930s, racial legislation was strictly applied to Torres Strait Islanders, enabling the government to remove Islanders to reserves and missions across Queensland.

A world-wide influenza epidemic reached the Torres Strait in 1920, resulting in 96 deaths in the region. The Queensland Government provided the islands of Masig, Iama and Poruma with food relief to help them recover from the outbreak. In March 1923, Masig and Poruma were hit by a "violent hurricane" which destroyed local crops and gardens. The Queensland Government subsequently established new facilities on Masig during the 1930s, including an Aboriginal Industries Board store, a court house, and improved roads.

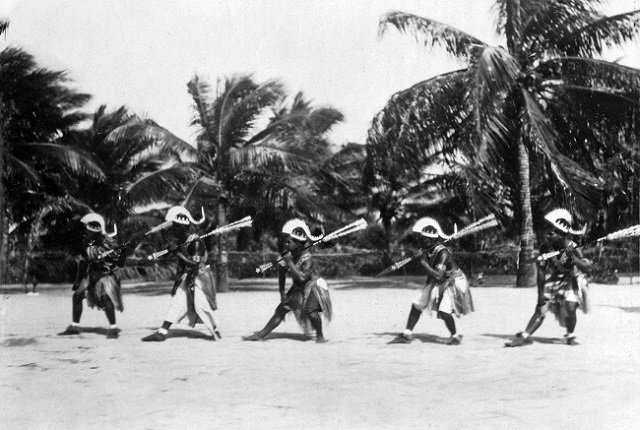
Dancers on Masig Island, 1931

In 1936, around 70% of the Torres Strait Islander workforce went on strike in the first organised challenge against government authority made by Torres Strait Islanders. The nine-month strike was an expression of Islanders’ anger and resentment at the increasing government control of their livelihoods. The strike was a protest against government interference in wages, trade and commerce and also called for the lifting of evening curfews, the removal of the permit system for inter-island travel and the recognition of the Islanders’ right to recruit their own boat crews.

This strike produced a number of significant reforms and innovations. Unpopular local Aboriginal Protector J.D. McLean was removed and replaced by Cornelius O’Leary, who established a system of regular consultations with elected islander council representatives. The new island councils were given a degree of autonomy, including control over local island police and courts.

On 23 August 1937, O’Leary convened the first Inter Islander Councillors Conference at Masig. Representatives from 14 Torres Strait communities attended. Barney Mosby, Dan Mosby and William represented Masig at the conference. After lengthy discussions, unpopular bylaws, including the evening curfews, were cancelled and a new code of local representation was agreed upon.

In 1939 the Queensland Government passed the Torres Strait Islander Act 1939, which incorporated many of the recommendations discussed at the conference. A key section of the new act officially recognised Torres Strait Islanders as a separate people from Aboriginal Australians.

During World War II, the Australian Government recruited Torres Strait Islander men to serve in the armed forces. Enlisted men from Masig and other island communities formed the Torres Strait Light Infantry. While the Torres Strait Light Infantry were respected as soldiers, they only received one third of the pay given to white Australian servicemen. On 31 December 1943, members of the Torres Strait Light Infantry went on strike, calling for equal pay and equal rights. The Australian Government agreed to increase their pay to two thirds the level received by white servicemen. Full back pay was offered in compensation to the Torres Strait servicemen by the Australian Government in the 1980s.

Following World War II, the pearling industry declined across Torres Strait and Islanders were permitted to work and settle on the Australian mainland. Prawning and fishing enterprises were established at Masig in the 1970s. Luggers owned by Masig families continued to operate until the collapse of the pearl industry in the 1960s, after which the people shifted successfully into commercial mackerel fishing, prawning and crayfishing.

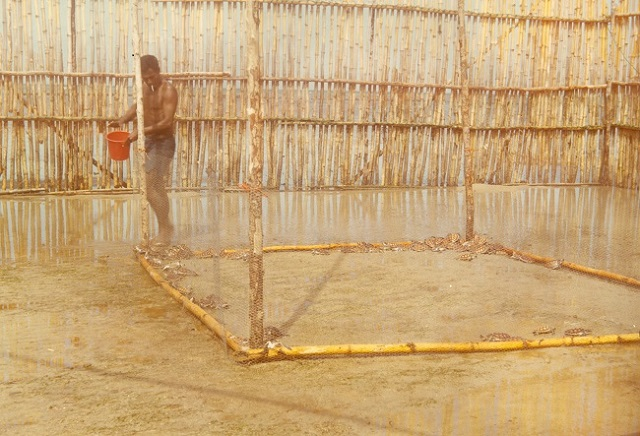
Turtle farm, Masig Island

In 1970, the Australian Government established a turtle farm on the island to provide employment for Torres Strait Islander people. However, turtles take too long to mature and the costs of farming them was greater than their value when sold for eating. The project was later abandoned and the remaining turtles released into the sea.

In December 1978, a treaty was signed by the Australian and Papua New Guinea governments that described the boundaries between the two countries and the use of the sea area by both parties. The Torres Strait Treaty, which commenced operation in February 1985, contains special provision for free movement (without passports or visas) between both countries. Free movement between communities applies to traditional activities such as fishing, trading and family gatherings which occur in a specifically created Protected Zone and nearby areas.

Yorke Island State School opened on 29 January 1985. On 1 January 2007, it became the Yorke Island Campus of Tagai State College.

On 30 March 1985, the Masig community elected 3 councillors to constitute an autonomous Masig Island Council established under the Community Services (Torres Strait) Act 1984. This Act conferred local government-type powers and responsibilities upon Torres Strait Islander councils. The council area, previously an Aboriginal reserve held by the Queensland Government, was transferred on 21 October 1985 to the trusteeship of the council under a Deed of Grant in Trust (DOGIT).

Native title was recognised over Masig in 2000, held in trust by the Masigalgal (Torres Strait Islander) Corporation RNTBC.

In 2007, the Local Government Reform Commission recommended that the 15 Torres Strait Island councils be abolished and the Torres Strait Island Regional Council be established. The first Torres Strait Island Regional Council was elected on 15 March 2008 in elections conducted under the Local Government Act 1993.

== Demographics ==
In the 2016 census, Masig Island had a population of 270 people.

In the 2021 census, Masig Island had a population of 283 people.

== Education ==
Yorke Island Campus (Masig Muysaw Ngurpay Lag) is a primary (Early Childhood-6) campus of government school Tagai State College (headquartered at Thursday Island). It is at 131 William Street (9.7505°S 143.4166°E).

There are no secondary schools on Masig Island. The nearest government secondary school is Tagai State College on Thursday Island, approximately 150 kilometres (93 mi) away. Distance education or boarding schools are options.

== Facilities ==
Yorke Island SES Facility is on Barneys Road (9.7514°S 143.4146°E).

Masig (Yorke Island) Primary Health Care Centre is at 115 Aous Road (9.7522°S 143.4149°E). The health care centre is staffed by a qualified nurse and there is also a doctor based there, who provides medical services to three other islands in the central island cluster (Coconut, Yam and Warraber).

There is an IBIS store on the island and also a Mini-Mart.

== Transport ==
Yorke Island Airfield is 1 kilometre (0.62 mi) long and lies diagonally between the north and south side of the island (9.7526°S 143.4054°E).

A regular scheduled air service is operated by West Wing Aviation from Horn Island, otherwise access to Masig is by charter plane or boat. All goods and mail are delivered by a weekly barge service and via the scheduled air service.

== Popular culture ==
Yorke Island was the film location for the Australian television series, RAN Remote Area Nurse.

== See also ==
- Torres Strait Islands#Climate change
- List of Torres Strait Islands
- Yorke Island Airport
