= Torres Strait Island Region =

Coordinates: 9°52′S 142°35′E

- Local government area
- Interactive map of Torres Strait Island Region
- Country: Australia
- State: Queensland
- Region: Far North Queensland
- Established: 15 March 2008
- Council seat: Thursday Island

Government
  - Mayor: Phillemon Sereako Mosby
  - State electorate: Cook
  - Federal division: Leichhardt

Area
  - Total: 490 km^{2} (190 sq mi)

Population
  - Total: 4,124 (2021 census)
  - Density: 8.42/km^{2} (21.80/sq mi)
- Website: Torres Strait Island Region
LGAs around Torres Strait Island Region
Merauke Regency, South Papua (Indonesia)	Morehead Rural LLG, Western Province (Papua New Guinea)	Daru Urban LLG / Kiwai Rural LLG, Western Province (Papua New Guinea)
Arafura Sea	Torres Strait Island Region	Coral Sea
Northern Peninsula Area	Torres	Coral Sea

The Torres Strait Island Region is a local government area in Far North Queensland, Australia, covering part of the Torres Strait Islands. It was created in March 2008 out of 15 autonomous Island Councils during a period of statewide local government reform. It has offices in each of its 15 communities, and satellite services in Thursday Island and in Cairns (which are outside of the region).

In the 2021 census, the Torres Strait Island Region had a population of 4,124 people.

== Geography ==
The Region is effectively colocated with the Shire of Torres, which administers the northern tip of Cape York Peninsula and a number of islands including Thursday Island, Horn Island and Prince of Wales Island.

== History ==
The local government jurisdiction was created on 15 March 2008 from 15 previous entities—the Island Councils of Badu (Mulgrave Is.), Boigu (Talbot Is.), Dauan (Mt. Cornwallis Is.), Erub (Darnley Is.), Kirirri (Hammond Is.), Iama (Yam Is.), Arkai (Kubin Community at Mua Is.), Mabuiag (Jervis Is.), Masig (Yorke Is.), Mer (Murray Is.), Poruma (Coconut Is.), Saibai, Wug (St. Pauls Community at Mua Is.), Ugar (Stephen Is.), and Warraber (Sue Is.). Its first election was held on the same day.

In 1984, the Community Services (Torres Strait) Act was enacted by the Queensland Parliament, allowing community councils to be created to own and administer former reserves or missions under a Deed of Grant in Trust (DOGIT). Each was responsible for local basic utilities and services such as electricity, housing and management of local CDEP programs. They also worked with the Queensland Police to provide for community police officers—hence extending well beyond the normal functions of local government. The Local Government (Community Government Areas) Act 2004 extended to community councils many of the provisions and benefits of the Local Government Act 1993 normally enjoyed by shire councils.

In 2006, the councils were involved in a consultation process which resulted in a Green Paper being produced. The State Government subsequently took over the process, and in April 2007, a White Paper entitled "Community Government in the Torres Strait: the way forward" was released, recommending both governance and structural changes to ensure the sustainability of governance in the region. The White Paper expressed concerns about workload and capacity to meet community needs, deficiencies in corporate governance and accountability and other challenges and issues.

The Local Government Reform report in July 2007 recommended the creation of the Torres Strait Island council as well as the Northern Peninsula Area council to attempt to address these issues. The Queensland Government responded by proposing the Local Government and Other Legislation (Indigenous Regional Councils) Amendment Bill 2007 to bring the two new councils into line with the recommendations of both reports.

During statewide local government reform in 2007–08, the Queensland Government considered merging the Shire with the other islands and communities, but felt that having one council subject to three different types of legislation would be inefficient.

Because of the unique structure of the DOGIT areas, where a community owned the land and the council represented the community owners, concerns were raised by the councils about ownership potentially transferring to the new entities and diluting their title over it. Some councils responded by creating a private company with all community members as shareholders, and transferring the ownership to the company. This was opposed by the State Government who threatened to take legal action against the communities.

Following the elections, the Department of Local Government provided $675,000 to the Regional Council to assist with expenses relating to the post-amalgamation transfer process.

== Demographics ==
In the 2011 census, the Torrest Strait Island Region had a population of 4,248 people.

In the 2016 census, the Torres Strait Island Region had a population of 4,514 people, including the following sub-populations:

- Badu Island – 813
- Mer Island – 450
- Saibai Island – 465
- Boigu Island – 271
- Dauan Island – 191
- Erub Island (Darnley Island) – 310
- Hammond Island – 243
- Iama Island – 296
- Kubin (Moa Island) – 187
- Mabuiag Island – 210
- Masig Island – 270
- Poruma Island – 155
- St Pauls (Moa Island) – 237
- Ugar Island (Stephens Island) – 72
- Warraber Island – 232

In the 2021 census, the Torres Strait Island Region had a population of 4,124 people.

== Structure ==
The council consists of 15 divisions, each of which represents one of the former entities and elects one councillor, with a mayor being elected by the entire region. At the 2008 election, the following councillors were elected:

- Mayor – Phillemone Mosby
- Division 1 (Boigu) – Dimas Toby
- Division 2 (Dauan) – Torenzo Elisala
- Division 3 (Saibai) – Conwell Tabuai
- Division 4 (Mabuiag) – Keith Fell
- Division 5 (Badu) – Laurie Nona
- Division 6 (Kubin) – Lama Trinkoon
- Division 7 (St Pauls) – John Levi
- Division 8 (Hammond) – Seriako Dorante
- Division 9 (Iama) – Getano Lui (Jnr) (Deputy Mayor)
- Division 10 (Poruma) – Francis Pearson
- Division 11 (Warraber) – Kabay Tamu
- Division 12 (Masig) – Hilda Mosby
- Division 13 (Ugar) – Rocky Stephen
- Division 14 (Erub) – Jimmy Gela
- Division 15 (Mer) – Aven S. Noah

== Mayors ==
- 2008–2012: Frederick (Fred) Solomon Gela
- 2012–2016: Frederick (Fred) Solomon Gela (elected unopposed)
- 2016–2020: Frederick (Fred) Solomon Gela
- 2020–2024: Phillemon Sereako Mosby
- 2024–present: Phillemon Sereako Mosby

== Services ==
The Torres Strait Island Regional Council operate a public library at Poruma and Indigenous Knowledge Centres at Badu Island, Boigu Island, Dauan Island, Erub Island, Hammond Island, Iama Island, Kubin, Mabuiag, and Warraber.

On the 30 August 2002, Erub (Darnley Island) became the second Indignenous Knowledge Centre (IKC) to open in the Torres Strait. The IKC was established in a partnership between the Erub Island Council and State Library of Queensland. Erub Island Council was amalgamated into the newly created Torres Strait Island Regional Council (TSIRC) in 2008. The IKC has been operational and enjoyed by the community for the past 20 years. The IKC has participated in many projects including, Culture Love, a school holiday arts program delivered by TSIRC, State Library and Arts Queensland.

== See also ==
- Torres Strait Regional Authority
