= Deed of Grant in Trust =

Aboriginal land trust in Australia

A Deed of Grant in Trust (DOGIT) is the name for a system of community-level land trust established in Queensland to administer former Aboriginal reserves and missions. They came about through the enactment by the Queensland Government of the Community Services (Torres Strait) Act 1984 and Community Services (Aborigines) Act 1984 in 1984, allowing community councils to be created to own and administer former Aboriginal reserves or missions under a Deed of Grant in Trust). The trusts are governed by local representatives who are elected every three years to councils called Incorporated Aboriginal Councils. These councils have the power to pass by-laws, appoint police for the community, and are responsible for maintaining housing and infrastructure, running the Community Development Employment Program and issuing hunting, fishing and camping permits. As such, they work much like a local government, but are different in character as they own the land they administer on behalf of the community.

Most of the Torres Strait Islands entered DOGIT arrangements in October 1985, with the notable exception of Mer Island, which became the subject of the Mabo No.1 (1988) and No.2 (1992) cases. The first Aboriginal community to receive a DOGIT was Hope Vale on 27 July 1986. In the years following, many DOGIT communities were established—mostly in the Cape York Peninsula, Torres Strait Islands and Carpentaria regions. The Local Government (Community Government Areas) Act 2004 extended to community councils many of the provisions and benefits of the Local Government Act 1993 normally enjoyed by shire councils.

From 1 January 2015, some trustees, namely those classified as "urban" or "future urban" (numbering 34) are able to convert parts of the collective title to either Aboriginal freehold or Torres Strait Islander freehold title.

== Communities ==
The following is a list of DOGIT communities in Queensland.

Name of community	Area (km²)	Population	Excised from	Date granted	Deed number	Primary occupants
Badu Island	102.0	786	Shire of Torres	17 October 1985	21296126	
Bamaga	67.6	869	Shire of Torres	27 October 1986	21328057	
Boigu Island	71.7	295	Shire of Torres	17 October 1985	21296127	
Cherbourg	31.3	1241	Shire of Murgon	28 August 1986	16929228	Wakka Wakka
Dauan Island	3.6	120	Shire of Torres	17 October 1985	21296130	
Doomadgee	1786.0	1181	Shire of Burke	1987	50184313	Gangalidda/Waanyi
Erub (Darnley) Island	5.9	320	Shire of Torres	17 October 1985	21296129	
Hammond Island	15.7	208	Shire of Torres	17 October 1985	21296131	
Hope Vale	1115.4	856	Shire of Cook	27 July 1986	21321062	
Iama (Yam) Island	1.7	363	Shire of Torres	17 October 1985	21296138	
Injinoo	795.4	463	Shire of Cook	27 October 1986	21328058	
Kowanyama	2571.9	1112	Shire of Carpentaria	23 July 1987	21345064	Kokoberra, Yir Yorant, Kunjen
Kubin Island	152.5	226	Shire of Torres	17 October 1985	21296132	
Lockhart River	3596.9	605	Shire of Cook	29 October 1987	21352021	
Mabuiag Island	6.4	240	Shire of Torres	17 October 1985	21296133	
Mapoon	550.1	262	Shire of Cook	26 April 1989	(none)	Tjungundji
Napranum	2007.3	921	Shire of Cook	1 October 1989	21378037	
New Mapoon	93.9	381	Shire of Torres	27 October 1986	21328060	
Palm Island	71.0	2165	City of Townsville	27 October 1986	21328055	Bwgcolman, Manbarra
Pormpuraaw (Edward River)	4362.0	653	Shire of Carpentaria	28 July 1987	21345063	Thaayorre, Mungkan
Poruma (Coconut) Island	6.5	175	Shire of Torres	17 October 1985	21296128	
St Pauls Island	18.5	239	Shire of Torres	17 October 1985	21296136	
Saibai Island	104.5	368	Shire of Torres	17 October 1985	21296134	
Seisia (Red) Island	2.6	184	Shire of Torres	29 October 1987	21352022	
Ugar (Stephen) Island	0.4	57	Shire of Torres	17 October 1985	21296135	
Umagico (Alau)	53.4	267	Shire of Torres	27 October 1986	21328059	
Warraber (Sue) Island	0.9	239	Shire of Torres	17 October 1985	21296137	
Woorabinda	388.1	928	Shire of Duaringa	27 October 1986	30563185	
Wujal Wujal (Bloomfield River)	11.0	361	Shire of Cook	29 October 1987	21352023	Kuku Yalanji
Yarrabah (Cape Grafton)	156.1	2599	Shire of Mulgrave	27 October 1986	21328056	Gujangii
Yorke Island	1.6	336	Shire of Torres	17 October 1985	21296139	

== See also ==
- Indigenous land rights in Australia
