= Hammond Island (Queensland) =

- Town
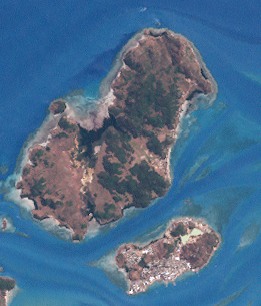
- Hammond and Thursday, Torres Strait

- Coordinates: 10.5543°S 142.2188°E
- Country: Australia
- State: Queensland
- LGA: Torres Strait Island Region

Government
  - State electorate: Cook
  - Federal division: Leichhardt

Population
  - Total: 261 (2021 census)
- Time zone: UTC+10:00 (AEST)
- Postcode: 4875

Hammond Island (Indigenous name: Keriri or Kiriri) is an island with a town of the same name, in the Torres Strait, Queensland, Australia. It is the only island within the locality of Keriri Island within the local government area of Torres Strait Island Region. In the 2021 census, Hammond Island had a population of 261 people, of whom 253 (96.9%) identified as Indigenous Australians.

== History ==
The Kaurareg people know Hammond Island as Keriri and are believed to have occupied this area prior to first contact with Europeans. Hammond Island is located in the Southern or Prince of Wales Island group of the Torres Strait. For thousands of years the Kaurareg followed traditional patterns of hunting, fishing and agriculture, and maintained close cultural and trading ties with the Aboriginal groups of the Northern Peninsula Area of Cape York. These close ties continue to exist today.

=== European contact ===
Captain Edwards of HMS Pandora named Hammond Island in August 1791, as he travelled through the Torres Strait with the captured Bounty mutineers. In 1802, the British navigator Matthew Flinders, in charge of HMS Investigator, sailed past Hammond Island. He noticed camp fires burning on the island but did not make contact with the Kaurareg people.

In August 1864, a government settlement was established at Somerset at the tip of Cape York. The police magistrates of Somerset were hostile in their dealings with the Aboriginal people of the Northern Peninsula Area of Cape York and the Kaurareg.

==== 1869 Massacre ====
In April 1869, the crew of the cutter Sperwer was killed after the ship anchored off Prince of Wales Island. Government authorities determined that "the Korrorega natives" (Kuarareg) were responsible for the killings. Three Kaurareg men were captured, found guilty of the Sperwer killings and executed by a party of Australian native police led by Somerset police magistrate Henry Chester. Frank Jardine, Chester's successor, led additional retaliatory attacks against the Kaurareg people on Prince of Wales Island during the 1870s.

==== 1872 Queensland Government control ====
In 1872, the Queensland Government sought to extend its jurisdiction and requested the support of the British Government. Letters Patent were issued by the British Government in 1872 creating a new boundary for the colony which encompassed all islands within a 60-nautical-mile radius of the coast of Queensland. This boundary was further extended by the Queensland Coast Islands Act 1879 (Qld) and included the islands of Boigu, Erub, Mer and Saibai, which lay beyond the previous limit. The new legislation enabled the Queensland Government to control and regulate bases for the beche-de-mer and pearling industries which previously had operated outside its jurisdiction.

During the 1880s, a pearling station operated on Hammond Island and in 1889, gold was discovered on the island. A number of prospectors and miners began moving to the island in September 1889 and these deposits were quickly exhausted.

An Aboriginal reserve was gazetted on Hammond Island by the Queensland Government in 1881. J.F.G. Foxton, W.E. Parry-Okeden and Dr W. Roth were appointed trustees of the reserve in February 1900.

==== 1900–1950 ====
The majority of the Kaurareg people were moved to Hammond Island in the first decade of the 20th century. The Annual Report of the Chief Protector of Aboriginals for 1913 stated that around 80 Kaurareg people were living on Hammond Island, comprising "representatives from all Islands adjacent to Thursday Island".

Strenuous efforts were made by the government in 1913 to encourage the Hammond Islanders to move to a new settlement on Moa Island, but without success. The Kaurareg people on Hammond Island were neglected by the government and received no school or medical facilities. Thirteen people died the following year, when an influenza epidemic swept through the island community.

By the 1920s, the Queensland Government was determined to move the Kaurareg people from Hammond Island, publicly stating that their close proximity to Thursday Island encouraged drunkenness and immorality in the community. Preparations for the removal began in 1921, with the construction of new quarters at Adam village on Moa. In March 1922 the Kaurareg community was forcibly removed by the government authorities from Hammond Island and transported to Moa Island on a Papuan Industries vessel named the Goodwill. Three members of the Hammond Island community, who protested against the removal, were arrested without charge by police armed with revolvers.

From the 1880s onwards, many Filipino immigrant workers living in the Torres Strait married local Aboriginal and Torres Strait Islander women. These marriages were conducted by the Catholic Church. During the 1920s, the presence of mixed-race families on Thursday Island was an embarrassment to the government authorities, who were applying strict racial legislation to Aboriginal and Torres Strait Islander people.

In 1928, the Catholic Church on Thursday Island obtained permission to establish a mission settlement for families of Filipino ancestry at Hammond Island. St Joseph's Catholic mission station was officially inaugurated at Hammond Island on Ascension Thursday in 1929. The mission was administered by Catholic priests and nuns of the Sacred Heart Order. The families of Nicholas Sabatino and Joseph Kanak were the first to settle at the mission. Catholic families from other Torres Strait Islands were encouraged to move to St Joseph's mission, where St Joseph's School (Hammond Island) opened in 1935. The school closed during World War II when the island was evacuated. Nuns returned in 1950 to reopen school, but it closed in 1963.

In 1936, 70% of Torres Strait Islander workers went on strike, protesting against government control over their livelihoods. The strike produced significant reforms including the establishment of a system of government consultations with elected Islander council representatives. The new island councils were given a degree of autonomy including control over local Island police and courts. The first Inter-Islander Councillors Conference was convened at Yorke Island in August 1937. Representatives from 14 Torres Strait communities, including Hammond Island, attended. In 1939, the Queensland Government passed the Torres Strait Islander Act 1939, which incorporated many of the recommendations made at the conference. A key section of the new act officially recognised Torres Strait Islanders as a separate people from Aboriginal Australians.

During World War II, the civilian population of Hammond Island was evacuated to the Sisters of Mercy Convent at Cooyar in southeast Queensland. The mission buildings on the island were taken over by the army, and an RAAF radar station operated between 1942 and 1943.

==== 1950–2000 ====
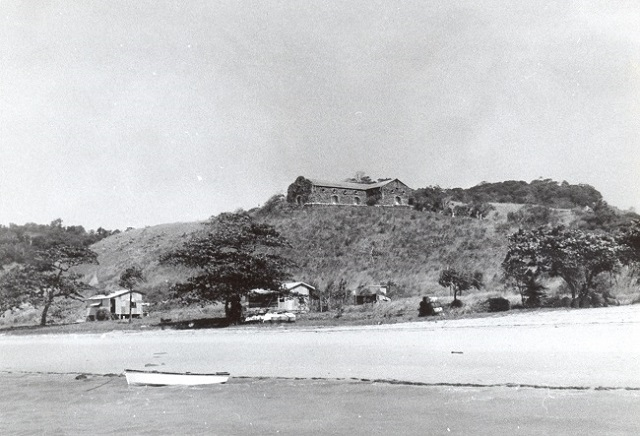
Hammond Island with the church on the hill

After World War II, the pearling industry declined across Torres Strait and Islanders were permitted to work and settle on Thursday Island and the Australian mainland. However some mission residents returned to Hammond Island where they found that white ants had destroyed their church. Work began on the construction of a new Catholic church. In 1952, St Joseph's Church was built on top of a hill overlooking the sea, using locally quarried stone and volunteer labour, with materials transported by the pearl luggers Little Flower and Trixen. In 1964, the priest and sisters of the mission were moved to Thursday Island.

After gaining its independence from Australia in 1975, Papua New Guinea asserted its right to the islands and waters of the Torres Straits. A proposal was put forward to divide the Torres Straits between the two countries at a longitude of 10 degrees. The proposed division was completely rejected by the Queensland Government and the Torres Strait Islander community. In December 1978, a treaty was signed by the Australian and Papua New Guinea governments that described the boundaries between the two countries and the use of the sea area by both parties.

The Torres Strait Treaty, which has operated since February 1985, contains special provision for free movement (without passports or visas) between both countries. Free movement between communities applies to traditional activities such as fishing, trading and family gatherings which occur in a specifically created Protected Zone and nearby areas. The Protected Zone also assists in the preservation and protection of the land, sea, air and native plant and animal life of the Torres Strait.

==== 2001-Present Day ====
Our Lady of the Sacred Heart School opened in 2002.

== Demographics ==
In the 2016 census, Hammond Island had a population of 268 people, of whom 251 (93%) identified as Indigenous Australians.

In the 2021 census, Hammond Island had a population of 261 people, of whom 253 (96.9%) identified as Indigenous Australians.

== Local government ==
On 30 March 1985, the Keriri community elected three councillors to constitute an autonomous council established under the Community Services (Torres Strait) Act 1984. On 21 October 1985, the council area, previously an Aboriginal reserve, was transferred to the trusteeship of the council under a Deed of Grant in Trust by the Queensland Government.

In 2007, the Local Government Reform Commission recommended that the 15 Torres Strait Island councils be abolished and the Torres Strait Island Regional Council be established in their place. In elections conducted under the Local Government Act 1993 on 15 March 2008, members of the 15 communities comprising the Torres Strait Island Regional Council local government area each voted for a local councillor and a mayor to constitute a council consisting of 15 councillors plus a mayor.

== Education ==
Our Lady of the Sacred Heart School is a private primary (Prep-3) campus at Lot 11 Church Street (10.5494°S 142.2103°E) of Our Lady of the Sacred Heart School headquartered at Thursday Island. Older children take the daily ferry to Thursday Island to attend the main school there.

There are no government schools on the island. The nearest primary and secondary government school is Tagai State College on Thursday Island.

== Facilities ==
The Torres Strait Island Regional Council operates the Hammond Island Indigenous Knowledge Centre at Wonie Road.

St Joseph the Worker's Catholic Church is within the Thursday Island Parish of the Roman Catholic Diocese of Cairns.

== See also ==
- List of Torres Strait Islands
