= Tagai State College =

Coordinates: 10°34′54″S 142°13′12″E

Tagai State College is a primary and secondary school in the Torres Strait Islands in Queensland, Australia. It has its headquarters on Thursday Island.

== Campuses ==
The college operates 16 primary school campuses on individual islands in the Torres Strait in addition to a secondary school campus on Thursday Island, which has boarding school facilities for students attending from other islands.

== Student numbers ==
In 2023, the college had an enrolment of 1,237 students from Early Childhood to Year 12. There were 156 teachers (154 full-time equivalent) and 176 non-teaching staff (128 full-time equivalent). 146 staff members (118 full-time equivalent) are Indigenous.
