= Boigu Island =

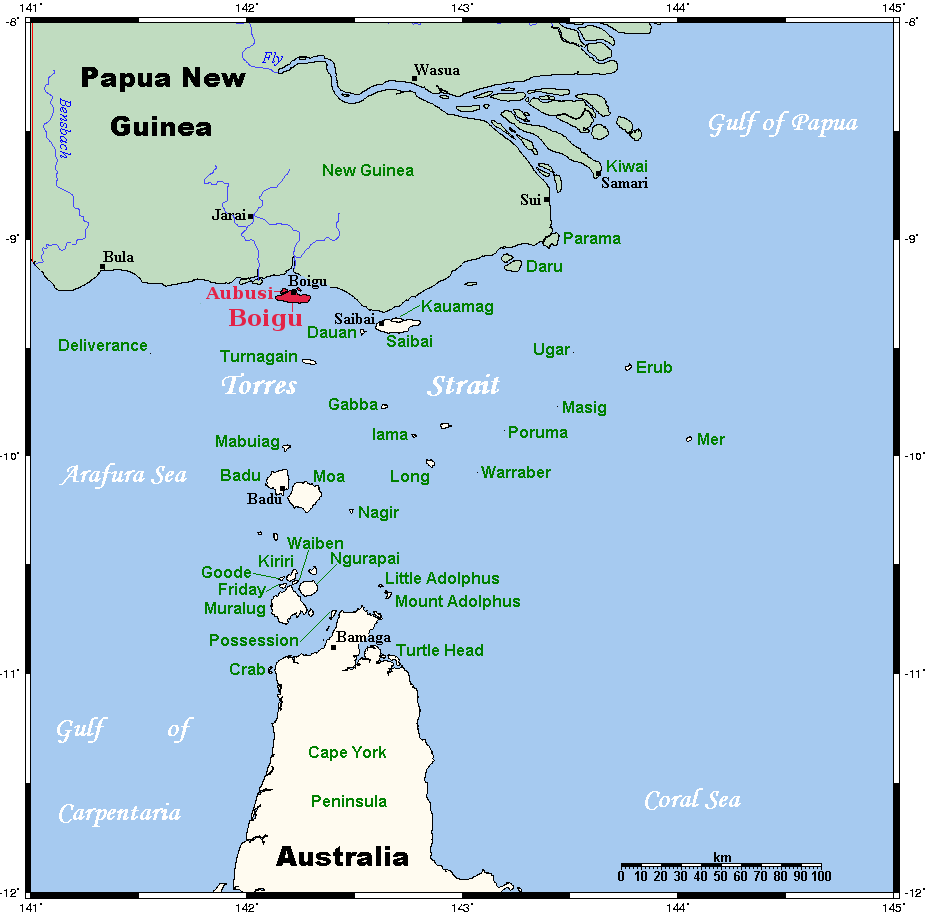
- Boigu within the Torres Strait Islands

- Location within Australia

Geography
- Location: Torres Strait
- Coordinates: 9.2594°S 142.2127°E
- Archipelago: Torres Strait Islands
- Area: 89.6 km^{2} (34.6 sq mi)
- Length: 18.12 km (11.259 mi)
- Width: 5.05 km (3.138 mi)
- Highest elevation: 18 m (59 ft)
- Highest point: unnamed

Administration
- Australia
- State: Queensland
- LGA: Torres Strait Island Region
- Island Region: Top Western
- Largest settlement: Boigu

Demographics
- Population: 199 (2021)
- Pop. density: 3.0/km^{2} (7.8/sq mi)
- Ethnic groups: Torres Strait Islanders

Boigu Island
- Town
- Interactive map of Boigu Island
- Coordinates: 9.2594°S 142.2127°E
- Country: Australia
- State: Queensland
- LGA: Torres Strait Island Region

Government
  - State electorate: Cook
  - Federal division: Leichhardt

Area
  - Total: 66.3 km^{2} (25.6 sq mi)

Population
  - Total: 199 (2021 census)
  - Density: 3.002/km^{2} (7.774/sq mi)
- Time zone: UTC+10:00 (AEST)
Localities around Boigu Island
	Bugi (PNG)
Boigu Island
	Turnagain Island (QLD)

Boigu Island (also known as Malu Kiyay or Malu Kiwai) is the most northerly inhabited island of Queensland and of Australia. It is part of the Top Western group of the Torres Strait Islands, which lie in the Torres Strait separating Cape York Peninsula from the island of New Guinea. The mainland of Papua New Guinea is only 6 kilometres (3.7 mi) away from Boigu. Boigu has an area of 89.6 square kilometres (34.6 sq mi). Boigu Island is also the name of the town and locality on the island within the Torres Strait Island Region. Boigu is predominantly inhabited by indigenous Torres Strait Islanders. In the 2021 census, the population of the island was 199, of whom 189 people or 95% of the population identified as Indigenous Australians.

It is the largest and only inhabited island of the Talbot Islands group (9.2591°S 142.2064°E).

== Language and affiliations ==
The language of Boigu is that of the Western and Central Islands of the Torres Strait. The specific dialect is Kalau Kawau Ya, also spoken on the islands of Dauan and Saibai. The people of the three islands consider themselves as one people.

Kala Kawaw Ya (also known as Kalaw Kawaw, KKY) is one of the languages of the Torres Strait. Kala Kawaw Ya is the traditional language owned by the Top Western islands of the Torres Strait Island Region.

== Geography ==
Boigu Island is approximately 18 kilometres (11 mi) long, and low-lying. It was formed by the accumulation of alluvial sediments deposited by the discharge of nearby New Guinean rivers into the Strait. These sediments built up over time on an old coral platform which rises from the shallow continental shelf, eventually creating the island.

The Island is separated from the mainland of Papua New Guinea (near the border of Kiwai Rural LLG and Morehead Rural LLG) by a stretch of water measuring 6 kilometres (3.7 mi) at its narrowest point. The island is also the closest Australian territory to the Republic of Indonesia, just 123 kilometres (76 mi) east-southeast of the southern tip of the Indonesia–Papua New Guinea border within the Merauke Regency of Western New Guinea.

The village of Boigu at the northern end of the island (9.2324°S 142.2186°E). It is the northernmost settlement of Australia, but the northernmost land is the uninhabited Bramble Cay, 173 kilometres (107 mi) to the east.

Most of the island is subject to extensive periodic flooding, and as a result the community township has been built on the highest ground.

There are a number of smaller islands nearby, including:

- Aubussi Island, also known as Awbuz (9.2342°S 142.1700°E)
- Moegina Kawa (9.2285°S 142.1472°E)
- Sapural Kawa (9.2240°S 142.1487°E)
- Aymermud (9.2319°S 142.1571°E)
- Moimi Island, also known as Moeyim (9.2280°S 142.2419°E)

Boigu Island Airport is on the south-western edge of the village (9.2327°S 142.2181°E).

== History ==
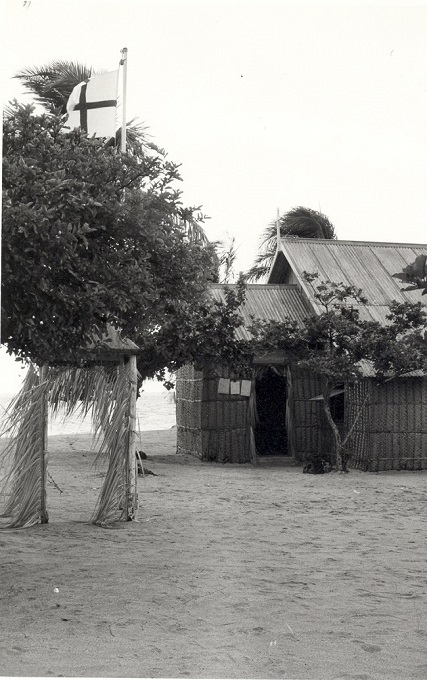
Church on Boigu beach

Boigu was visited by South Sea Islander missionaries of the London Missionary Society, some time after the establishment of a mission on nearby Saibai Island in 1871.

From the 1870s to around 1910, the Boigu, Dauan and Saibai people, along with the neighbouring Papuan peoples, were being harassed by thugeral "warriors" from the Marind-anim, fierce headhunters from what is now southeast South Papua. In literature dealing with the period, these people are generally termed 'Tuger' or 'Tugeri'. Sir William MacGregor, the Lieutenant-Governor of British New Guinea, noted in 1886 that the population was nearly extinct as a result of these raids. What he did not realise was that at the time the bulk of the population were staying with family on Saibai and Dauan for mutual protection.

According to 2004 Torres Strait Regional Authority (TSRA) figures, its resident population was approximately 340.

Malu Kiwai State School opened on 29 January 1985. In 2007, it was one of 17 schools in the Torres Strait Islands that amalgamated, becoming the Malu Kiwai Campus of Tagai State College (which has its main campus on Thursday Island).

In the 2016 census, there were 271 people living on the island, of whom 231 identified as Indigenous Australians (107 male, 124 female).

In the 2021 census, there were 199 people living on the island, of whom 189 identified as Indigenous Australians (84 male, 104 female).

== Ecology ==
The island is considered part of the New Guinea mangroves ecoregion, a subset of the Australasian realm.

The interior of the island is sparsely vegetated, and mainly swampland. The coast is fringed by mangroves, which act to protect against the island's sand and mud from sea erosion.

It is likely the mangrove regions harbour healthy populations of saltwater crocodile.

The waters surrounding the island are an important habitat for dugongs, a species of sea mammal listed as vulnerable by the IUCN.

== Education ==
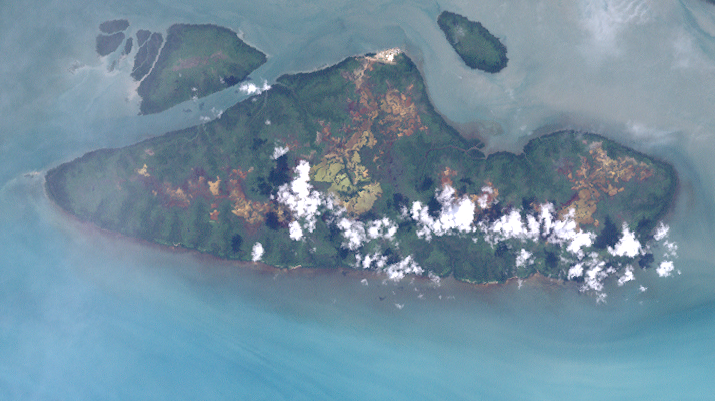
Satellite image of Boigu Island.

The Malu Kiwai Campus of the Tagai State College is a primary (Early Childhood–Year 6) campus of Tagai State College at School Road (9.2310°S 142.2193°E).

There is no secondary school on the island. The secondary school campus of Tagai State College is on Thursday Island.

== Amenities ==
The Torres Strait Island Regional Council operates an Indigenous Knowledge Centre (library) at 66 Chamber Street (9.2304°S 142.2208°E). Partnering with the State Library of Queensland on many occasions over the years, and developed in consultation with the Divisional Manager and Elders on island, the IKC has seen the 2013 Culture Love Program, designed around the theme 'War and Church'. During the project local Elders/Artists were employed to work alongside State Library staff to build their skills in developing and delivering creative arts and language workshops with children and young people in their communities.

With its close proximity to Papua New Guinea, each weekday PNG island traders travel 45 minutes by boat to Boigu Island to sell their products.

Boigu Island Primary Health Care Centre is operated by Queensland Health on Chamber Street (9.2307°S 142.2209°E).

Boigu Island Sewage Treatment Plant is on the western edge of the village on the Esplanade (9.2317°S 142.2166°E).

== See also ==
- List of Torres Strait Islands
- Torres Strait Islands#Climate change
