= Aero-Tropics Air Services =

Airline based in Cairns, Queensland, Australia

IATA	ICAO	Call sign
HC	ATI	AEROTROPICS
- Founded: 1995
- Commenced operations: February 2000
- Ceased operations: October 2008
- Operating bases: Cairns Airport
- Hubs: Horn Island Airport
- Fleet size: 13
- Destinations: 13
- Headquarters: Cairns, Queensland, Australia
- Website: ~~Aero-Tropics.com.au~~

Lip-Air Pty Ltd, operating as Aero-Tropics Air Services (ATAS), was an airline based in Cairns, Queensland, Australia. Its main base was Cairns Airport, with its operating hub at Horn Island Airport.

== History ==
Lip-Air Pty Ltd was a privately owned company established by the Lippmann family in 1995. The company's Aero Tropics Air Services (ATAS) division started operating air charters in 1997, serving the region of Torres Strait, Cape York and the Gulf of Carpentaria. ATAS obtained a Regular Public Transport licence in February 2000 from the Civil Aviation Safety Authority (CASA) and began operating daily scheduled services to/ from and between the Torres Strait Islands. In March 2007 it had 50 employees. It grew from one 5-seat Partenavia P.68 aircraft based on Coconut Island to a fleet of eighteen aircraft based at Karumba, Horn Island and Cairns. As of November 2008 it operated scheduled domestic services to 12 destinations in the Torres Strait Islands. In late June 2008 the airline was grounded for five days by the Civil Aviation Safety Authority (CASA). As a result, the Queensland Government removed the Government contract for Aero-Tropics delivering mail and some supplies, flying to many remote Cape York towns. The contract was awarded to West Wing Aviation. In October 2008 CASA grounded the airline again after two incidents on successive days prompted concerns about the airline's training and supervision of its pilots. The second grounding proved to be permanent, as the airline went into liquidation the following month.

== Fleet ==
As of July 2008, the Aero-Tropics Air Services (ATAS) fleet consisted of:

- 4 Aero Commander 500S Shrike Commander
- 1 Beechcraft King Air B200
- 6 Britten-Norman BN2A Islander
- 2 Cessna 208B Grand Caravan

At the time of liquidation, the Civil Aviation Safety Authority (CASA) showed that the airline owned the following aircraft:

- 5 Britten-Norman BN2A Islander
- 2 Aero Commander 500S Shrike Commander
- 2 Piper PA-31 Navajo
- 2 Cessna 208B Grand Caravan
- 1 Cessna 172N

== Destinations ==
As of July 2008, Aero-Tropics Air Services (ATAS) operated scheduled domestic services to the following destinations:

1. Badu Island – Badu Island Airport
2. Boigu Island – Boigu Island Airport
3. Cairns – Cairns Airport
4. Coconut Island (Poruma Island) – Coconut Island Airport
5. Darnley Island (Erub Island) – Darnley Island Airport
6. Horn Island – Horn Island Airport (hub)
7. Kubin Village (Moa Island) – Kubin Airport
8. Mabuiag Island – Mabuiag Island Airport
9. Murray Island – Murray Island Airport
10. Saibai Island – Saibai Island Airport
11. Warraber Island (Sue Islet) – Warraber Island Airport
12. Yam Island (Iama Island) – Yam Island Airport
13. Yorke Island – Yorke Island Airport

== See also ==
- Transair (Australia)
- List of defunct airlines of Australia
- Aviation in Australia
