= Saibai Island Airport =

Airport in Queensland, Australia

- IATA: SBR; ICAO: YSII

Summary
- Airport type: Private
- Owner: Torres Strait Island Regional Council
- Location: Saibai Island, Queensland
- Elevation AMSL: 15 ft / 5 m
- Coordinates: 09°22′42″S 142°37′30″E

Map
- Location in Queensland

Runways
Direction	Length		Surface
Direction	m	ft	Surface
12/30	750	2,461	paved
- Sources: Australian AIP and aerodrome chart

Saibai Island Airport (IATA: SBR, ICAO: YSII) is an airport on Saibai Island, Queensland, Australia.

== Airlines and destinations ==
Airlines	Destinations
Hinterland Aviation	Boigu Island, Horn Island, Warraber Island, Yam Island
Skytrans Airlines	Boigu Island, Horn Island, Warraber Island, Yam Island

== See also ==
- List of airports in Queensland
