= Darnley Island Airport =

Airport in Queensland, Australia

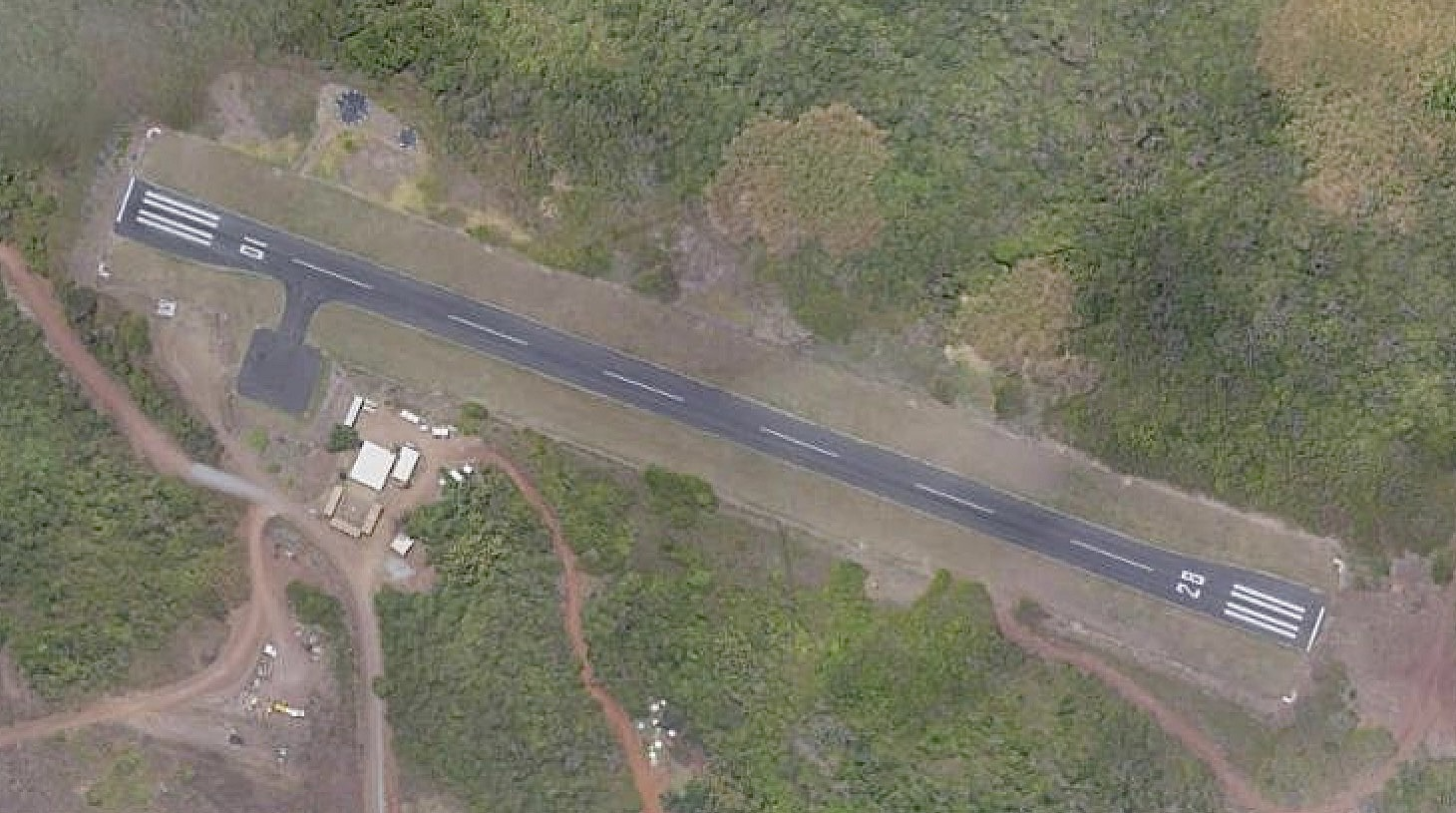
- Aerial view of Darnley Island Airport taken in 20 September 2011.
- IATA: NLF; ICAO: YDNI

Summary
- Airport type: Private
- Operator: Torres Strait Island Regional Council
- Elevation AMSL: 220 ft (67 m)
- Coordinates: 09°34′40″S 143°46′45″E

Map
- Location in Queensland

Runways
| Direction | Length | | Surface |
| Direction | m | ft | Surface |
|---|---|---|---|
| 10/28 | 450 | 1,476 | Paved |
- Sources: Australian AIP

Darnley Island Airport (IATA: NLF, ICAO: YDNI) is an airport in Darnley Island, Queensland, Australia. The airport was constructed in 1986, providing health and transport services for the island. In 1994, a paved runway was built to provide all-weather operations for the airport.

== History ==
In October 1965, a request was made for the Queensland Government to improve aerial connectivity to the Torres Strait, which could support healthcare support for those living at Darnley Island and many others. Darnley Island would end up as one of the last islands to receive an airstrip under a scheme, aimed at developing aviation infrastructure in the Torres Strait Islands. In November 1986, the construction of an airstrip at Darnley Island was accelerated as it neared the monsoon season. As a result, extra construction machinery was rented.

=== Modernisation ===
Following a request made by the Darnley Island Council, the Queensland Government began the construction of an all-weather runway in 1994, including the sealing of a 3.5 kilometre access road. The combined projects had cost $1.2 million. Pavement work for the runway was completed by 12 August, and the access road was completed a month later. In September 1994, these new additions were opened, providing a low-maintenance transport link into the community. In 1997, the runway was resealed.

== Airlines and destinations ==
| Airlines | Destinations |
|---|---|
| Hinterland Aviation | Horn Island, Murray Island, Yorke Island |
| Skytrans Airlines | Horn Island, Murray Island, Yorke Island |

== Accidents & incidents ==
- On 24 November 2021, a Cirrus SR22 on descent landed 100 metres from the threshold, and the aircraft started to 'wobble' as the nose wheel grounded. As the aircraft neared the end of the runway, the pilot applied full braking and the aircraft resumed wobbling. Consequently, it overran the runway and rolled down a steep embankment, flipping over. Both the pilot and passenger sustained injuries.

== See also ==
- List of airports in Queensland
