= Warraber Island Airport =

Airport in Queensland, Australia

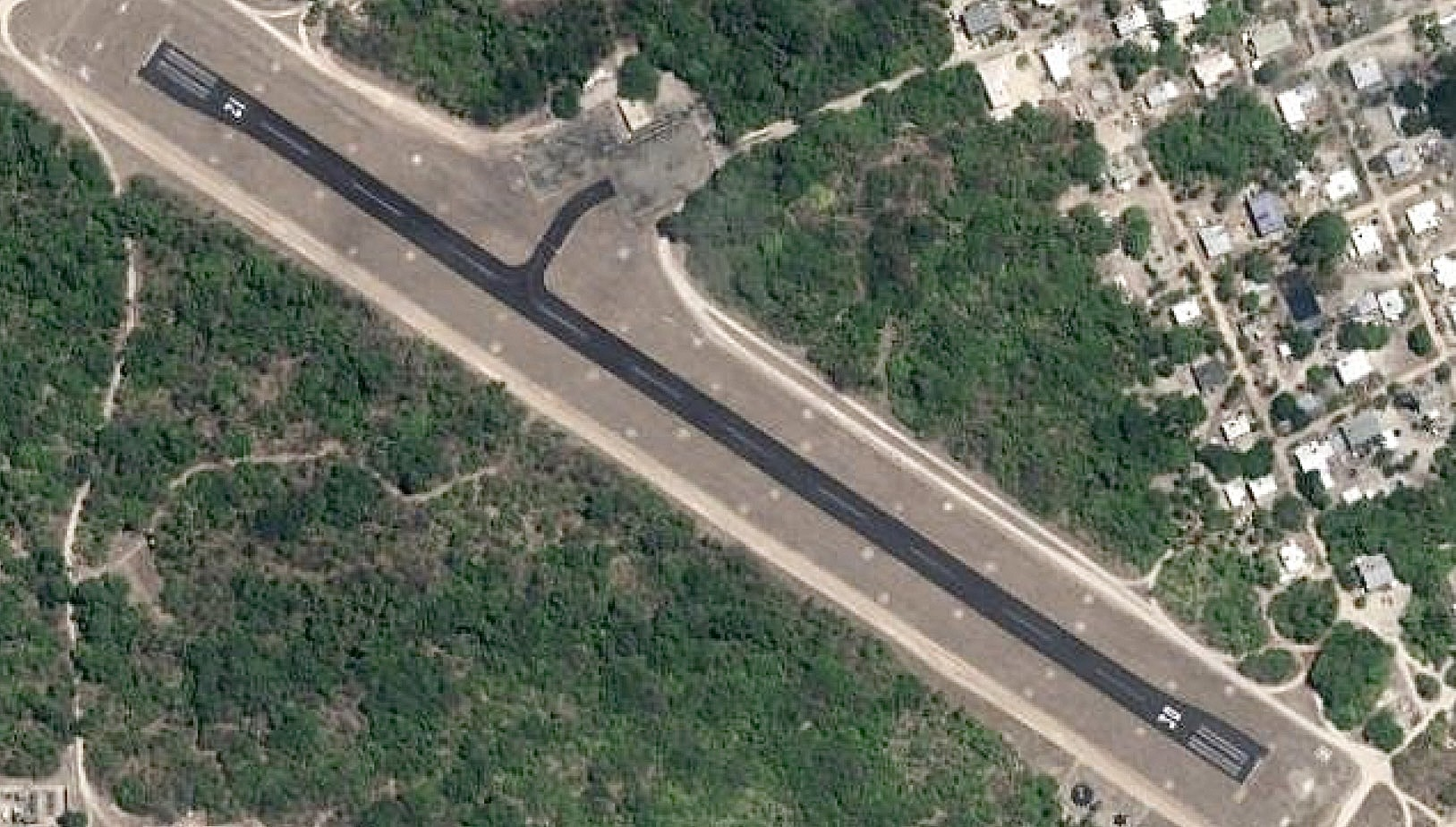
- Aerial view of Warraber Island Airport taken on 15 November 2023.
- IATA: SYU; ICAO: YWBS

Summary
- Airport type: Private
- Operator: Torres Strait Island Regional Council
- Location: Sue Islet
- Elevation AMSL: 10 ft (3.0 m)
- Coordinates: 10°12′24″S 142°49′24″E

Map
- Location in Queensland

Runways
Direction	Length		Surface
Direction	m	ft	Surface
12/30	705	2,313	Paved
- Sources: Australian AIP

Warraber Island Airport (IATA: SYU, ICAO: YWBS) is an airport in Sue Islet, Torres Strait, Queensland, Australia. It was named Nelson Airport and officially opened on 26 November 1977.

== History ==
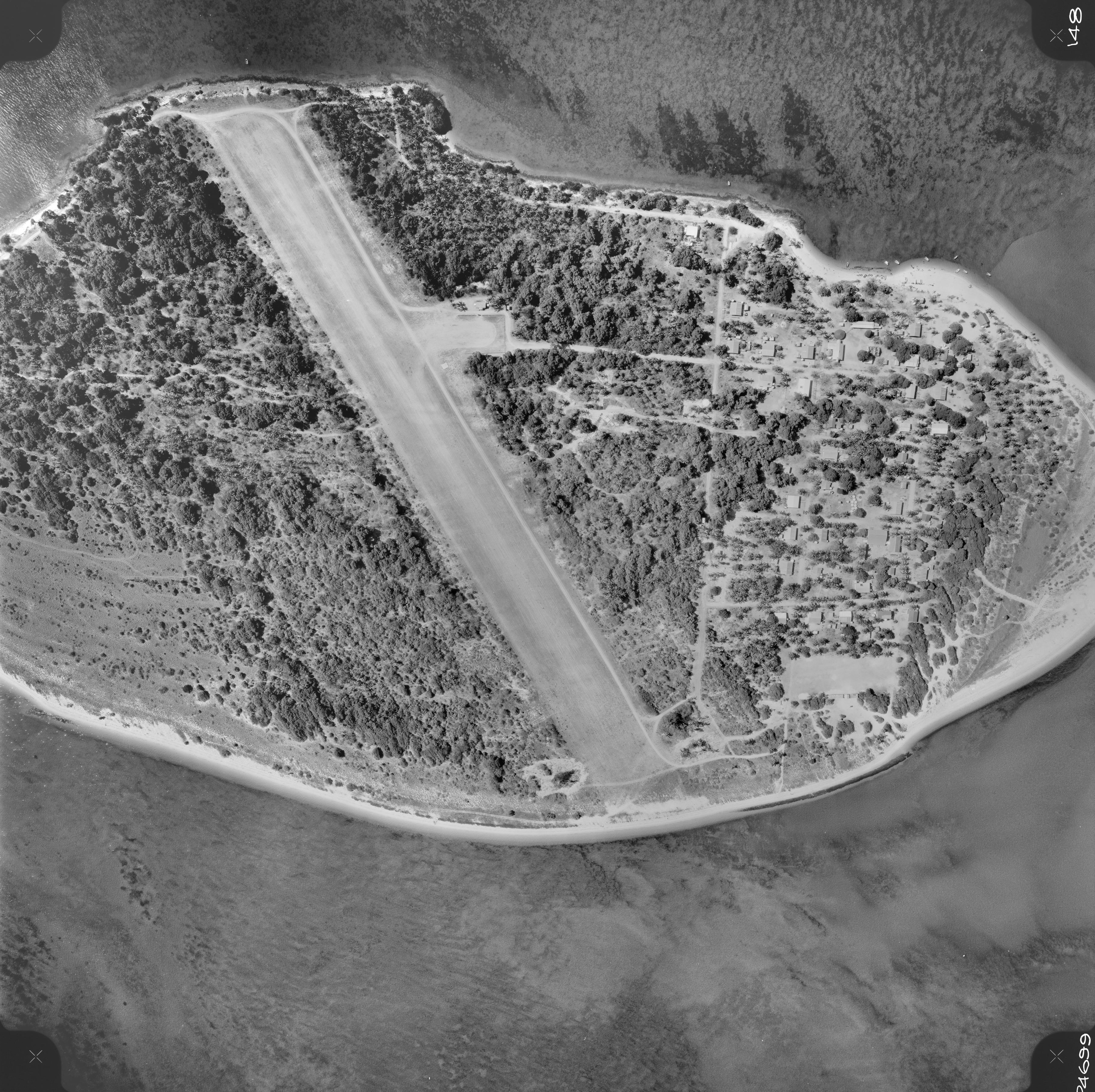
Aerial view of Warraber Island Airport taken on 26 November 1987.

On 26 November 1977, the airstrip opened as Nelson Airport. Following the airstrip's opening, special t-shirts were made to mark the occasion. They were later worn during the airstrip's sealing of the runway in 2005.

=== Modernisation ===
In April 2005, works commenced on upgrading Warraber Island Airport at a cost of $1.3 million. It included installing perimeter fencing, replacing aerodrome furniture, and sealing the unpaved runway with 705 metres of bitumen. The project was undertaken by engineering firm Connell Wagner and six members of the local Warraber community trained through the Heavy Equipment and Management Training Program. While the airstrip was closed, a ferry service from Coconut Island maintained access to the island. After three months, on 12 June 2005, the construction of the runway was completed and the airstrip reopened two weeks ahead of schedule. The official blessing and reopening ceremony was held on 3 August by Warren Entsch, Federal Member for Leichhardt, and Jason O’Brien, State Member for Cook. Warraber Island Airport was the third last airstrip requiring sealing, with Murray Island Airport next and Yam Island Airport last.

== Facilities ==
Warraber Island Airport is equipped with a single bitumen surfaced runway measuring 705 metres and designated 12/30, running northwest to southeast of the entire island. It sits at an elevation of 10 metres. The airport itself has a windsock, shed, and perimeter fencing.

== Airlines and destinations ==
Airlines	Destinations
Skytrans Airlines	Coconut Island, Horn Island, Saibai Island, Yam Island

== See also ==
- List of airports in Queensland
