= QRA =

QRA may refer to:

- Quantile regression averaging, in econometrics and forecasting
- Quantitative risk assessment, an estimation of risk
- Quaternary Research Association, associated with the Journal of Quaternary Science
- Queensland Regional Airlines, a defunct Australian airline
- Quick Reaction Alert, a NATO state of readiness in military aviation
- Rand Airport (IATA airport code: QRA), South Africa
- QRA locator, an obsolete geographic coordinate system
- Kra (letter), the letter used in place of Q in some Inuit orthographies, also spelled Qra
- Radio Q code for "What is the name of your vessel (or station)?" or "The name of my vessel (or station) is ____."
