= Yam Island Airport =

Airport in Queensland, Australia

- IATA: XMY; ICAO: YYMI

Summary
- Airport type: Private
- Operator: Torres Strait Island Regional Council
- Location: Yam Island, Queensland
- Elevation AMSL: 15 ft / 5 m
- Coordinates: 9.8993°S 142.7745°E

Map
- Location in Queensland

Runways
Direction	Length		Surface
Direction	m	ft	Surface
11/29	795	2,608	Paved
- Sources: Australian AIP and Great Circle Mapper

Yam Island Airport (IATA: XMY, ICAO: YYMI) is an airport in Yam Island, Queensland, Australia.

== Airlines and destinations ==
Airlines	Destinations
Hinterland Aviation	Coconut Island, Horn Island, Warraber Island, Yorke Island
Skytrans Airlines	Coconut Island, Horn Island, Warraber Island, Yorke Island

== See also ==
- List of airports in Queensland
