= OKR (disambiguation) =

Okr or OKR can refer to:

- Objectives and key results, a goal management tool to define quantifiable goals and assess their implementation
- OKR, a vehicle registration plate code for Krapkowice County, Poland
- okr, ISO language code for Kirike (Kirikeni okwoin), an Ijaw language of Nigeria
- Optokinetic nystagmus, a combination of eye movements with slow and fast phase
- Yorke Island Airport (IATA code: OKR), Australia

== See also ==
- Ochre, a brownish-yellow color
