= Minimum crossing altitude =

Minimum obstacle crossing altitude for fixes on published airways

In aviation, a minimum crossing altitude (MCA) is the lowest altitude at which a navigational fix can be crossed when entering or continuing along an airway that will allow an aircraft to clear all obstacles while carrying out a normal climb to the required minimum en route IFR altitude (MEA) of the airway in question beyond the fix.

The definition given here concerns primarily United States airspace; procedures and practices may vary in other countries.

== Overview ==
Airways are normally designed such that an aircraft moving from one segment with one MEA to another segment with a higher MEA can safely begin a normal climb (see below) to the higher MEA upon crossing the fix that divides the two segments and still remain well clear of obstacles. When obstacles along the airways are such that a normal climb beginning at the fix defining an airway segment is not adequate to provide proper obstacle clearance, a minimum crossing altitude (MCA) is published for the fix indicating the minimum altitude at which the fix must be crossed when entering that specific airway segment in order to make it possible to safely climb to the MEA while remaining clear of obstacles. You must be at or above the MCA by the time you reach the intersection so a climb should be established prior to reaching the intersection.

The normal climb values used for determining MCAs in the United States are: 150 feet per nautical mile from mean sea level (MSL) to 5000 feet MSL; 120 feet per nautical mile from 5000 feet to 10,000 feet MSL; and 100 feet per nautical mile at 10,000 feet MSL or above.

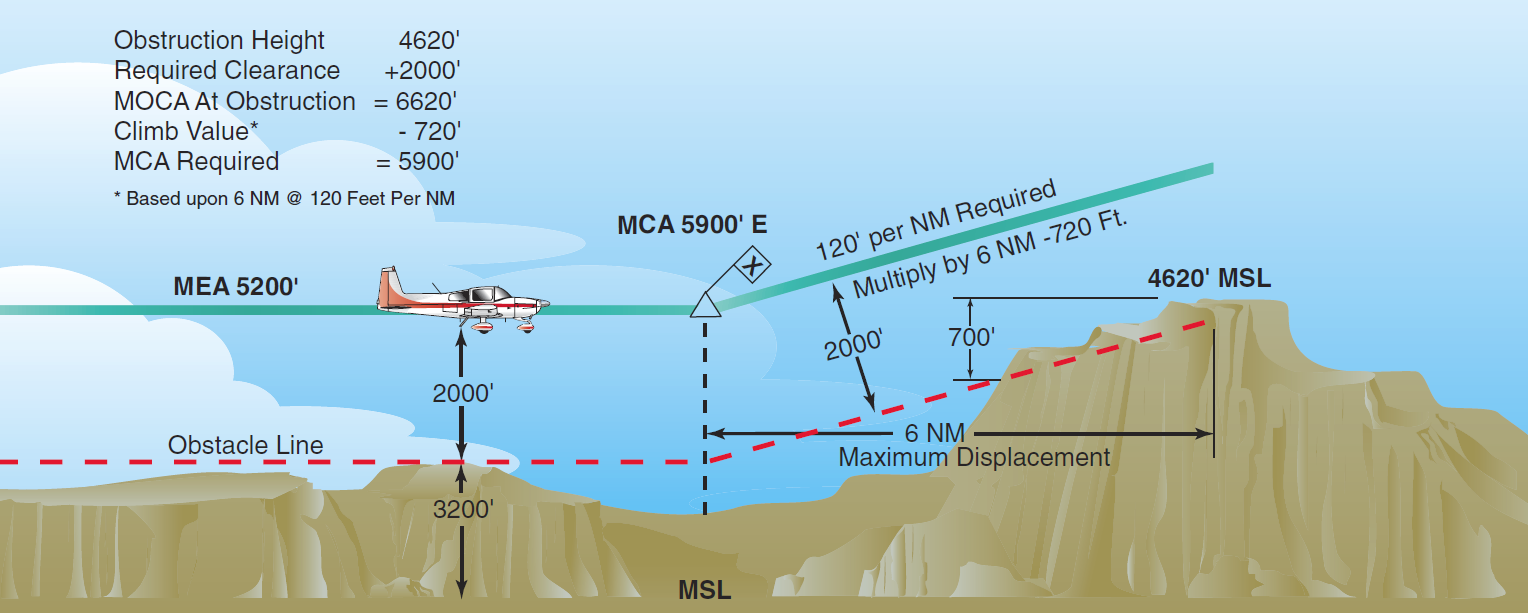
Illustration showing how MCA is determined

For example, see the illustration above. In this case, a segment of an airway ending at fix ABC has a MEA of 5200 feet MSL, and the minimum obstacle clearance altitude (MOCA) required to clear an obstacle six nautical miles from the fix within the next segment is 6620 feet MSL. The total increase in altitude from 5200 feet to 6620 feet over that distance is 1420 feet. At a normal rate of climb (120 feet per nautical mile at this altitude), the maximum altitude that can be gained over that distance is 720 feet, which is 700 feet below the required MOCA. Thus, a MCA for fix ABC of 5900 feet MSL (700 feet above the MEA of the previous segment) will be published for fix ABC for traffic continuing into the airway segment concerned from that fix.
