= Grid square =

The term Grid square has multiple uses

- Maidenhead Locator System, a Geocode system used by radio amateurs worldwide
- A 1 km^{2} square defined by a National grid reference system, see Projected coordinate system#Grid reference encodings
- A neighbourhood in Milton Keynes, England, see Milton Keynes#Grid roads and grid squares
