= Aero-Tropics Air Services Flight 675 =

2005 aviation accident

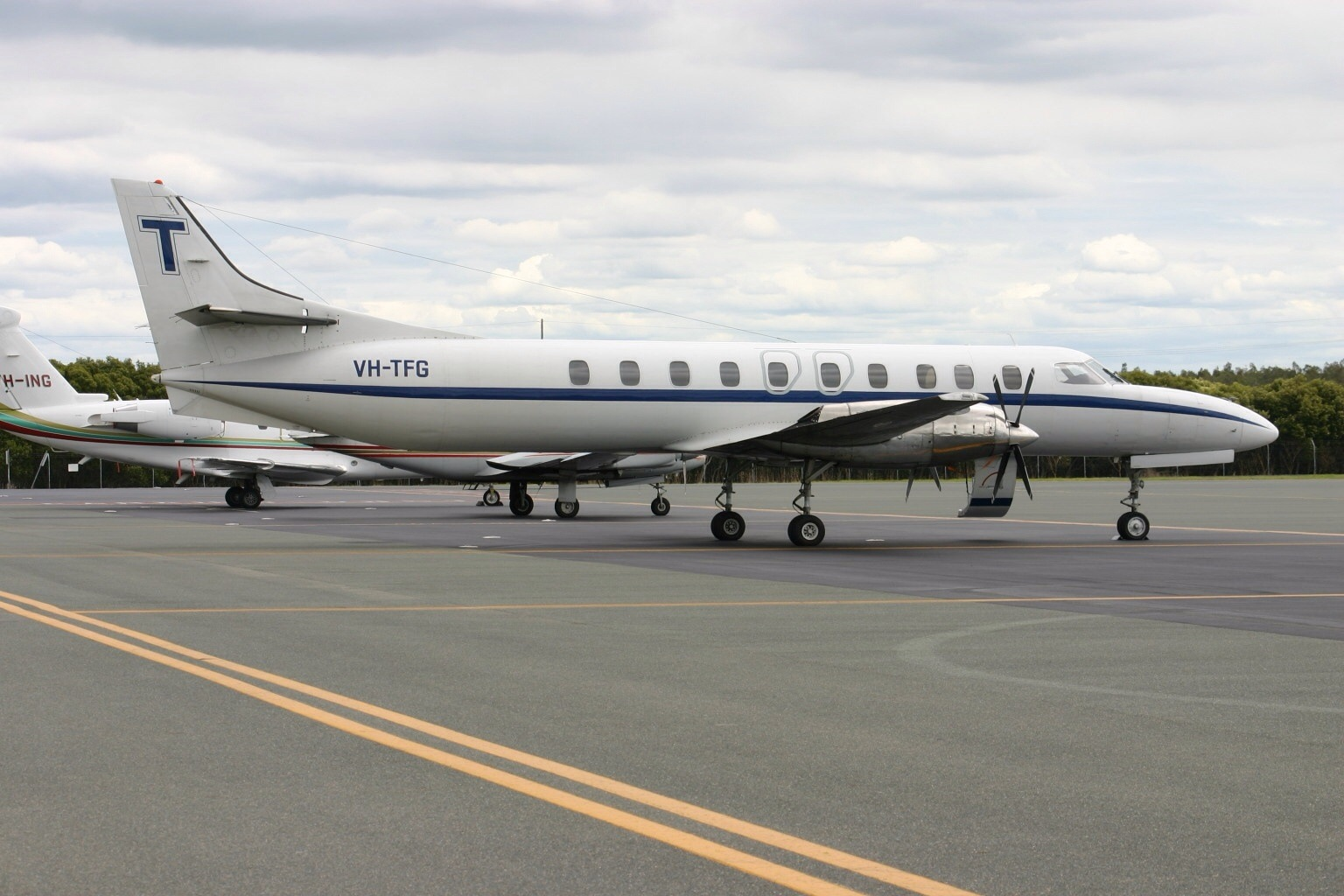
- Fairchild Metroliner similar to VH-TFU

Accident
- Date: 7 May 2005
- Summary: Controlled flight into terrain due to pilot error
- Site: 11 km north-west of Lockhart River Airport, Australia; 12.737°S 143.218°E

Aircraft
- Aircraft type: Fairchild Swearingen SA227-DC Metro 23
- Operator: Aero-Tropics Air Services on behalf of Transair
- IATA flight No.: HC675
- ICAO flight No.: ATI675
- Call sign: TANGO FOXTROT UNIFORM
- Registration: VH-TFU
- Flight origin: Bamaga/Injinoo Airport
- Stopover: Lockhart River Airport
- Destination: Cairns Airport
- Occupants: 15
- Passengers: 13
- Crew: 2
- Fatalities: 15
- Survivors: 0

On 7 May 2005, Aero-Tropics Air Services Flight 675 crashed while on approach to land at Lockhart River Airport in Queensland, Australia, on a ridge known as South Pap 6 nautical miles (11 km) north-west of the airport. All thirteen passengers and 2 crew on board died as the aircraft was completely destroyed by impact forces and subsequent fire. The Fairchild Swearingen Metroliner commuter aircraft, registered VH-TFU, was owned by Transair Ltd and operated by Aero-Tropics. The flight was scheduled from Bamaga on Cape York to the regional centre of Cairns, with a stopover in Lockhart River. It was the worst air crash in Australia in 36 years since MacRobertson Miller Airlines Flight 1750 on 31 December 1968. The event is sometimes known as the Lockhart River air disaster.

== Investigation ==
The Queensland Coroner's Inquest in 2007 found that despite evidence that there were a number of issues leading up to the crash, pilot error was the prime cause. "Aircraft engine and flight control system parameters were normal" during the descent, and no other structural defects were determined according to the Australian Transport Safety Bureau (2007). Families of those who lost their lives in the disaster have been highly critical of the Coroner's findings, the deficiencies in the operations of the regulator (the Civil Aviation Safety Authority, CASA), and the poor company structure and practices of Transair Ltd.

The investigation was aided by flight information from the aircraft's flight data recorder. The cockpit voice recorder was unserviceable, and had been for some time, so the conversations occurring between the flight crew will never be known.

=== Senate inquiry ===
As a result of intense lobbying by the father of one of the victims, Constable Sally Urquhart, and others, the Australian Senate's Rural and Regional Affairs and Transport Committee resolved to conduct an inquiry into the Civil Aviation Safety Authority, its operations and other matters. The Inquiry was convened on 2–3 July 2008 at Parliament House, Canberra. As well as Mr Shane Urquhart's submission, there were sixty others which were considered by the Inquiry. The vast majority of the submissions were highly critical of most aspects of CASA's operations. Several people and organisations, including Mr Urquhart, supported their submissions in person at the Inquiry. In September 2008, the Committee Chair, Senator Glenn Sterle, released the report of the inquiry to the Transport Minister Mr Anthony Albanese and the public.

The recommendations from the report are:

1. That the Australian Government strengthens CASA's governance framework and administrative capability by:

a. introducing a small board of up to five members to provide enhanced oversight and strategic direction for CASA; and
b. undertaking a review of CASA's funding arrangements to ensure CASA is equipped to deal with new regulatory challenges.

2. In accordance with the findings of the Hawke Taskforce, that CASA's Regulatory Reform Program be brought to a conclusion as quickly as possible to provide certainty to industry and to ensure CASA and industry are ready to address future safety challenges.
3. That the Australian National Audit Office audit CASA's implementation and administration of its Safety Management Systems approach.

== Further incidents ==
Following the Lockhart River crash, Transair in Australia went into liquidation in late 2006. Aerotropics also no longer operates because the Civil Aviation Safety Authority cancelled its Air Operator Certificate due to ongoing safety breaches. Transair continued to operate its PNG business until 31 August 2010 when the company's Cessna Citation ran off the runway on landing at Misima Island near Milne Bay, Papua New Guinea. The previous owner of Transair in Australia, Les Wright, died along with three others in the ensuing inferno. There was one survivor.
