= Coconut Island Airport =

Airport in Queensland, Australia

Coconut Island
- IATA: CNC; ICAO: YCCT

Summary
- Airport type: Private
- Operator: Torres Strait Island Regional Council
- Location: Coconut Island, Queensland, Australia
- Elevation AMSL: 10 ft / 3 m
- Coordinates: 10°03′00.5″S 143°04′16.5″E

Map
- Location in Queensland

Runways
Direction	Length		Surface
Direction	m	ft	Surface
09/27	720	2,362	Paved
- Sources: Australian AIP

Coconut Island Airport (IATA: CNC, ICAO: YCCT) is an airport located on Coconut Island (Poruma Island) in Queensland, Australia.

The airport is located at latitude -10.05010 and longitude 143.07000. The airport has one runway: 9/27. The ICAO airport code of this field is YCCT. The airport's IATA code is CNC. Nearby other airfields are Warraber Island Airport, Yam Island Airport, Yorke Island Airport, Saibai Island Airport and Darnley Island Airport.

== Airlines and destinations ==
Airlines	Destinations
Skytrans Airlines	Horn Island, Warraber Island, Yam Island, Yorke Island

== Accidents and incidents ==
- On 16 January 1999, Uzu Air Britten-Norman Islander VH-XFF was operating a passenger and cargo flight from Horn Island, NT with three passengers and one pilot, when on final approach the pilot noticed a vehicle was parked on the runway with nobody attending to it. The pilot initiated a go-around. Witnesses reported the aircraft entered a shallow climb before pitching sharply right and crashing into a tidal flat. The pilot and two passengers were killed. The surviving passenger was seriously injured.

== See also ==
- List of airports in Queensland
