= Transair =

Transair may refer to:

- Transair (Australia), a defunct airline, formerly based in Australia
- Transair (Canada), a defunct airline, formerly based in Canada
- Transair (Senegal), a regional airline based in Senegal
- Transair (UK), a defunct airline, formerly based in the United Kingdom
- Trans Executive Airlines of Hawaii, dba Transair, a defunct cargo and charter airline based in the United States
- Transair Georgia, an airline based in Georgia
- Transair Sweden, a charter airline from Sweden that operated until 1981
