= JN53DV =

Time signal radio station in Italy

Coordinates: 43°54′48″N 10°17′44″E

JN53DV is the Maidenhead grid square of an experimental shortwave time signal station in Italy. It is located in the town of Corsanico-Bargecchia near Massarosa and operated by Italcable (ItalCable)

Sample of Italian time signal

== Transmission format ==
The station transmits on 10 MHz and 15 MHz with 90 watts of power. Audio is modulated on the upper sideband, with carrier retained. Voice time announcements are made (in a male voice) every minute, with longer station identification announcements (in a female voice) each quarter-hour.

The balance of each minute is filled with instrumental music, as well as SSTV images.

At the end of each minute is the standard RAI time signal, as generated by INRiM (Istituto Nazionale di Ricerca Metrologica, National Institute of Metrology Research) and broadcast intermittently on Italian radio and television stations. The minute is announced with six 1000 Hz pips, 0.1 seconds each, at the beginning of seconds 54 through 58, a pause, and then a seventh pip beginning on the minute.

Immediately before the pips, during seconds 52 and 53 of each minute, the CET/CEST time of the following minute is transmitted in binary-coded decimal form. Bits are sent using frequency-shift keying between 2,000 Hz (binary 0) and 2,500 Hz (binary 1) at a rate of 30 milliseconds per bit (33⅓ baud). 32 bits are transmitted during second 52, and 16 additional bits during second 53, as follows:

JN53DV time code
| First segment (second 52) | | | | | | | | | | Second segment (second 53) | | | | |
| Time | Bit | Weight | Meaning | Ex | Time | Bit | Weight | Meaning | Ex | Time | Bit | Weight | Meaning | Ex |
| :52.00 | 0 | 0 | Segment identification "01" | 0 | :52.48 | 16 | P1 | Odd parity, bits 0–16 | 1 | :53.00 | 32 | 1 | Segment identification "10" | 1 |
| :52.03 | 1 | 1 | Segment identification "01" | 1 | :52.51 | 17 | 10 | Month (01–12); Example: 05 | 0 | :53.03 | 33 | 0 | Segment identification "10" | 0 |
| :52.06 | 2 | 20 | Hour (00–23); Example: 13 | 0 | :52.54 | 18 | 8 | Month (01–12); Example: 05 | 0 | :53.06 | 34 | 80 | Year within century (00–99); Example: 94 | 1 |
| :52.09 | 3 | 10 | Hour (00–23); Example: 13 | 1 | :52.57 | 19 | 4 | Month (01–12); Example: 05 | 1 | :53.09 | 35 | 40 | Year within century (00–99); Example: 94 | 0 |
| :52.12 | 4 | 8 | Hour (00–23); Example: 13 | 0 | :52.60 | 20 | 2 | Month (01–12); Example: 05 | 0 | :53.12 | 36 | 20 | Year within century (00–99); Example: 94 | 0 |
| :52.15 | 5 | 4 | Hour (00–23); Example: 13 | 0 | :52.63 | 21 | 1 | Month (01–12); Example: 05 | 1 | :53.15 | 37 | 10 | Year within century (00–99); Example: 94 | 1 |
| :52.18 | 6 | 2 | Hour (00–23); Example: 13 | 1 | :52.66 | 22 | 20 | Day of month (01–31); Example: 01 | 0 | :53.18 | 38 | 8 | Year within century (00–99); Example: 94 | 0 |
| :52.21 | 7 | 1 | Hour (00–23); Example: 13 | 1 | :52.69 | 23 | 10 | Day of month (01–31); Example: 01 | 0 | :53.21 | 39 | 4 | Year within century (00–99); Example: 94 | 1 |
| :52.24 | 8 | 40 | Minute (00–59); Example: 26 | 0 | :52.72 | 24 | 8 | Day of month (01–31); Example: 01 | 0 | :53.24 | 40 | 2 | Year within century (00–99); Example: 94 | 0 |
| :52.27 | 9 | 20 | Minute (00–59); Example: 26 | 1 | :52.75 | 25 | 4 | Day of month (01–31); Example: 01 | 0 | :53.27 | 41 | 1 | Year within century (00–99); Example: 94 | 0 |
| :52.30 | 10 | 10 | Minute (00–59); Example: 26 | 0 | :52.78 | 26 | 2 | Day of month (01–31); Example: 01 | 0 | :53.30 | 42 | 4 | Summer time warning 7: No change imminent 1–6: Days until time change 0: Today at 02:00 or 03:00 | 1 |
| :52.33 | 11 | 8 | Minute (00–59); Example: 26 | 0 | :52.81 | 27 | 1 | Day of month (01–31); Example: 01 | 1 | :53.33 | 43 | 2 | Summer time warning 7: No change imminent 1–6: Days until time change 0: Today at 02:00 or 03:00 | 1 |
| :52.36 | 12 | 4 | Minute (00–59); Example: 26 | 1 | :52.84 | 28 | 4 | Day of week (1–7); Example: 7 = Sunday | 1 | :53.36 | 44 | 1 | Summer time warning 7: No change imminent 1–6: Days until time change 0: Today at 02:00 or 03:00 | 1 |
| :52.39 | 13 | 2 | Minute (00–59); Example: 26 | 1 | :52.87 | 29 | 2 | Day of week (1–7); Example: 7 = Sunday | 1 | :53.39 | 45 | SI1 | 1=Leap second at end of month | 0 |
| :52.42 | 14 | 1 | Minute (00–59); Example: 26 | 0 | :52.90 | 30 | 1 | Day of week (1–7); Example: 7 = Sunday | 1 | :53.42 | 46 | SI2 | 0=Add leap, 1=subtract leap | 0 |
| :52.45 | 15 | OE | 1=Summer time | 1 | :52.93 | 31 | P2 | Odd parity, bits 17–31 | 1 | :53.45 | 47 | P3 | Odd parity, bits 32–47 | 0 |

The example time is 1994-05-01 at 13:26. The day is a Sunday, summer time is in effect (CEST = UTC+2, so the UTC time is 11:26), and will remain so for the next week. No leap second is scheduled for the end of May.

Although the time code only includes two digits of year, it is possible to deduce two bits of century using the day of week. There is still a 400-year ambiguity, as the Gregorian calendar repeats weeks every 400 years, but this is sufficient to determine which years ending in 00 are leap years.
