= Minimum reception altitude =

In aviation, minimum reception altitude (MRA) is the lowest altitude on an airway segment where an aircraft can be assured of receiving signals from off-course navigation aids like VOR that define a fix. An MRA is determined by FAA flight inspection traversing an entire route of flight to establish the minimum altitude the navigation signal can be received for the route (which, along with obstacle clearance, defines the Minimum Enroute Altitude - MEA) and for off-course NAVAID facilities that determine a fix. When the MRA at the fix is higher than the MEA, an MRA is established for the fix, and is the lowest altitude at which an intersection can be determined.

== See also ==
- Above ground level
- Minimum en route altitude (MEA)
- Minimum obstacle clearance altitude (MOCA)
- Minimum safe altitude
