= Bourke Isles =

Group of islands and islets in the Torres Strait Islands

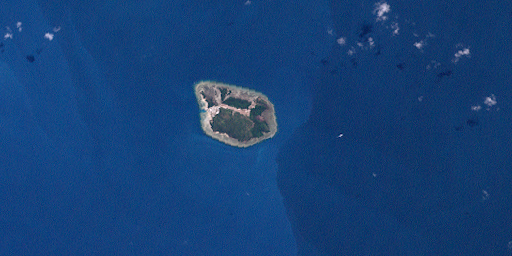
- A Landsat image of Yam Island, one of the Bourke Isles

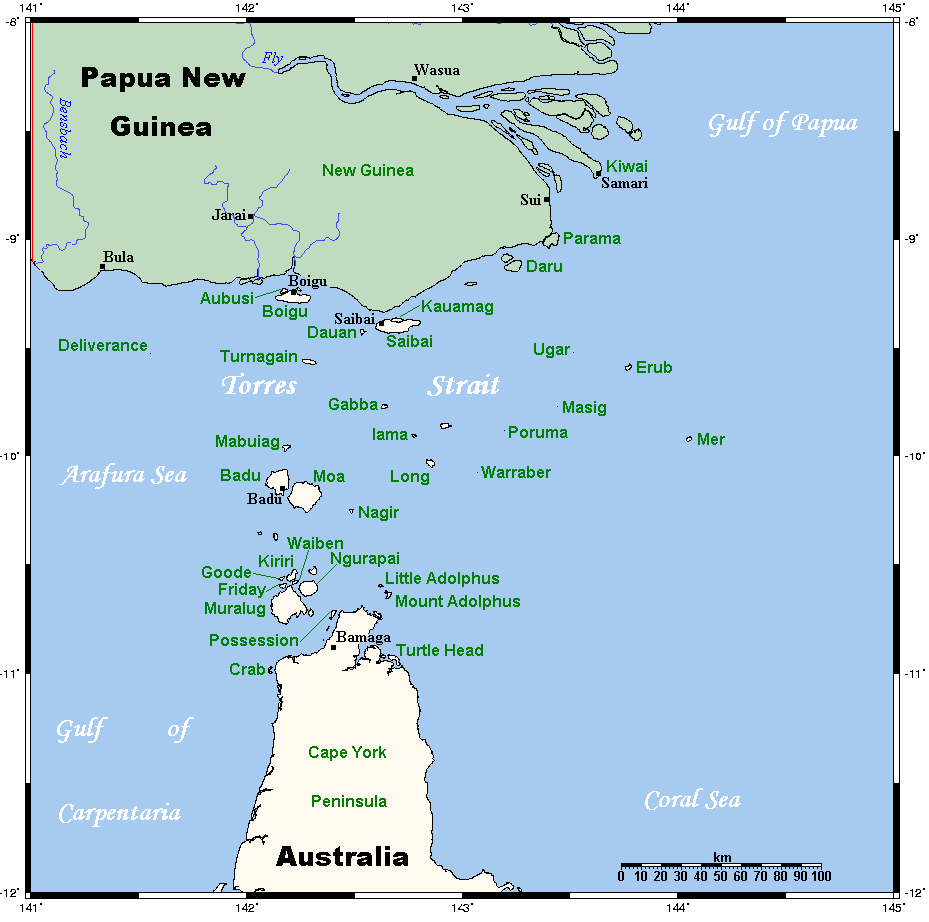
- A map of the Torres Strait Islands showing Yam Island as Iama in central waters of the Torres Strait
- Etymology: Richard Bourke

Geography
- Location: Cumberland Passage, Northern Australia
- Coordinates: 9°54′00″S 143°23′41″E
- Archipelago: Torres Strait Islands
- Adjacent to: Torres Strait
- Major islands: Yam Island

Administration
- Australia
- State: Queensland
- Local government area: Torres Strait Island Region

Demographics
- Ethnic groups: Torres Strait Islanders

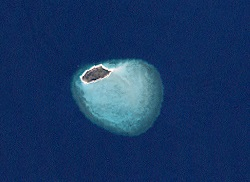
Aukane Island

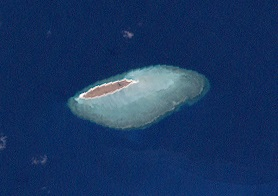
Roberts Islet

The Bourke Isles are a group of islands and islets in the archipelago known as the Torres Strait Islands, located west of the Cumberland Passage in the Torres Strait, and are part of the state of Queensland, Australia. The isles are situated approximately 130 kilometres (81 mi) northeast of Thursday Island and 54 kilometres (34 mi) southwest of Darnley Island.

The Bourke Isles, which comprise seven small islands or islets, are located within the Torres Strait Island Region, a Queensland local government area.

== The islands ==
The named Bourke Isles include:

- Aukane Islet
- Aureed Island
- Bourke Island
- Kabbikane Islet
- Layoak Islet
- Mimi Islet
- Roberts Islet
- Yam Island

== History ==
The islands were named in mid-1836 by Charles Lewis, the Commander of the schooner Isabella from the Colony of New South Wales, in honour of Richard Bourke, at the time, the Governor of New South Wales.

=== Aureed ===
In June 1836, the colonial schooner Isabella was despatched from Sydney under Captain Lewis to search for survivors of the barque Charles Eaton, which had been wrecked on the Great Detached Reef, part of the Great Barrier Reef near the Sir Charles Hardy Islands on 15 August 1834. It turned out that most of the crew and passengers who had survived the wreck and sailed on rafts to the Torres Strait, had been killed by Torres Strait Islanders from Mer, but a cabin boy and infant boy had been spared and lived with the Mer people for two years. The two survivors were rescued by Captain Lewis, after which Captain Lewis and his crew took masks from Mer while interacting with the local people.

After being told by a group of locals on the island of Massid (Yorke Island, or Masig) that men from Aureed had taken skulls back to that island, Lewis went to explore the group of small islands that he called the "Six Sisters", one of which was Aureed. Anchoring there, armed men went on to the island and found it deserted, the village abandoned. After burning the village to the ground, the men found a dilapidated shed, and in it a huge mask made of a single decorated turtle shell surrounded by human skulls of Europeans. This was later identified as a "skull house" used by the Kulka fraternity of a local cult. Lewis and his men took the skulls and mask, and set fire to everything on the island, including plantations of tobacco. Lewis dubbed the island "Skull Island", although this name was not taken up.

== See also ==
- List of Torres Strait Islands
