= Vonda Malone =

Indigenous Australian community leader

Vonda Lisa Malone
- Born: Thursday Island, Australia
- Other name: Vonda Lisa Moar
- Known for: First female Mayor of the Torres Shire Council.

Vonda Lisa Malone is a member of the Queensland Government Truth-telling and Healing Inquiry. Vonda was the first female Mayor of the Torres Shire Council.

== Family ==
Vonda is the daughter of Mary Isabella (Bella) Moar and is of Peidu Tribe, Erub Island and grew up on Thursday Island in the Torres Strait region.

== Career ==
Vonda has an extensive background in diplomacy and leadership. She served as an Australian diplomat with the Department of Foreign Affairs and Trade and later with the United Nations Office of the Human Rights Commission. Vonda is the founding Chair of Torres Health Indigenous Corporation.

From 1 May 2022 to 23 May 2024, Vonda was the Chief Executive Officer of the Torres Strait Regional Authority. Before this role, she was Chair of the Torres Cape Indigenous Council Alliance and Chair of Community Enterprise Queensland/Islanders Industry Board of Service (IBIS). Additionally, she served as the Executive Manager of the Torres Strait and Northern Peninsula Area Health Partnership.

Vonda has been involved in several advisory capacities, including as a member of the Indigenous Reference Group for the Developing Northern Australia Initiative, the NIAA Senior Advisory Group, and the Telstra Advisory Committee.

In 2001, Vonda became a Fellow of the United Nations Office of the Human Rights Commission Indigenous Fellowship Program. She is also a member of the Oxfam Australia Straight Talk Steering Committee, a representative on the TCHHS Clinical Safety and Quality Committee, a member of the Torres Strait Dementia Project, and a member of the Australian Institute of Company Directors.

== Awards ==
- Centenary Medal, for distinguished contribution to the Torres Strait Regional Authority
- 2017 McKinnon Emerging Political Leader of the Year
- NAIDOC Award of Excellence

== Education ==
- Fellow of Australian Rural Leadership Program
- Graduate Certificate in Public Sector Management
- Graduate Certificate in Australian Rural Leadership
