= Minimum obstacle clearance altitude =

Air regulation

Minimum Obstacle Clearance Altitude, or MOCA, is the lowest published altitude in effect between fixes on VOR airways or route segments that meets obstacle (like a building or a tower) clearance requirements for the entire route segment. Within the United States, this altitude also assures acceptable navigational signal coverage only within 22 nm of a VOR. The MOCA seen on the NACO en route chart, may have been computed by adding the required obstacle clearance (ROC) to the controlling obstacle in the primary area or computed by using a TERPS chart if the controlling obstacle is located in the secondary area. This figure is then rounded to the nearest 100 foot increment, i.e. 2,049 feet becomes 2,000, and 2,050 feet becomes 2,100 feet. An extra 2,000 feet is added in mountainous areas, 1,000 in non-mountainous. The MOCA is based upon obstacle clearance over the terrain or over manmade objects, adequacy of navigation facility performance, and communications requirements. The MOCA is always at or below the Minimum en route altitude (MEA), and may put an aircraft below air traffic control radar coverage and also below Minimum reception altitude (MRA) for navigation aids; as a result, it is typically used only in emergencies, especially to get below icing.

== See also ==
- Above ground level
- Minimum safe altitude
- Minimum crossing altitude
- Minimum en route altitude
- Instrument approach
