= Ethel May Eliza Zahel =

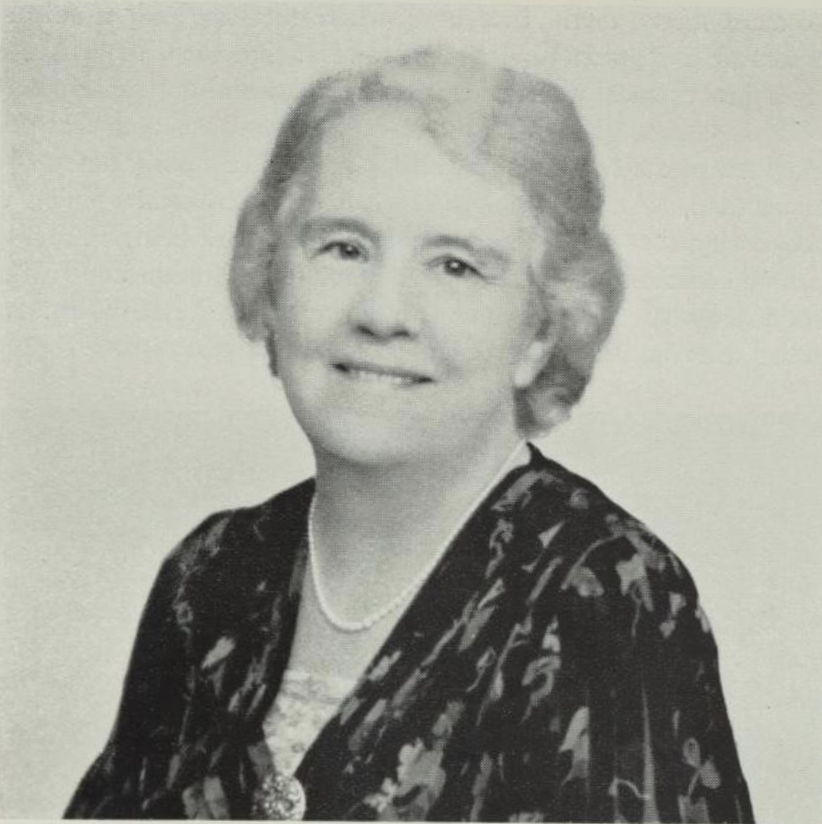
Ethel May Eliza Zahel

Ethel May Eliza Zahel (nee Kemp) (3 February 1877 – 9 April 1951) was an Australian public servant and schoolteacher who was born in Mackay, Queensland, Australia. On 6 November 1895, she married Mark Charles Zahel, solicitor, at her parents' home in Mackay. In 1905, she moved to Thursday island with her husband who died there on 4 June 1907. Ethel accepted a permanent appointment to the Torres Strait Islands teaching service dated on 15 June 1909. She moved to Yam Island with her daughter Ethel Lorenza, who died a few months later.

In October 1909, she opened a school on Badu (Mulgrave Island) and lived in the household of Frederick Walker, a former missionary. In 1915 she was given control of the Papuan Industries Ltd. 'company boats', owned by Islanders and signed authorizations for provisioning the vessels and payments made for pearl-shell and trochus brought back to Badu.

Australia's declaration of war against Japan in World War II led to her evacuation from the Torres Strait on 29 January 1942 and she then retired from the public service. She died in Brisbane, Queensland, Australia on 9 April 1951.
