= Boigu Island Airport =

Airport in Queensland, Australia

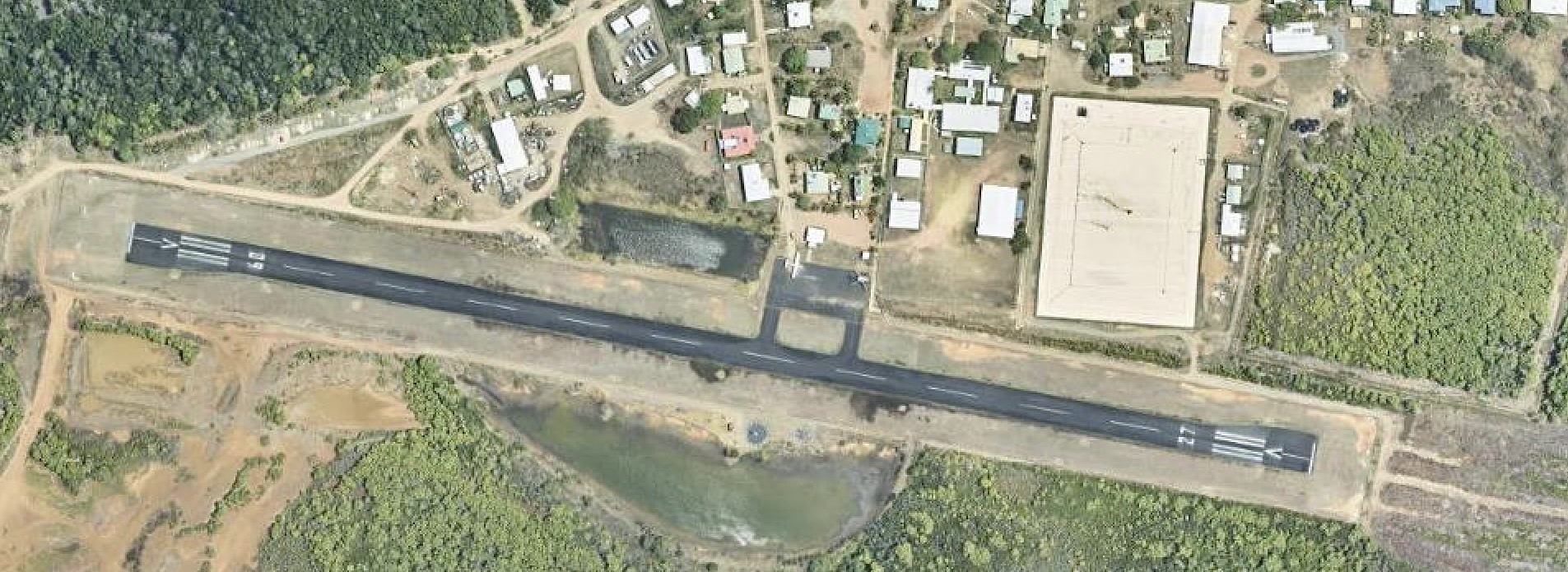
- Aerial view of Boigu Island Airport taken in 9 October 2019.
- IATA: GIC; ICAO: YBOI

Summary
- Airport type: Public
- Operator: Torres Strait Islands Regional Council
- Serves: Boigu Island, Queensland, Australia
- Elevation AMSL: 10 ft (3.0 m)
- Coordinates: 09°13′58″S 142°13′06″E

Map
- Location in Queensland

Runways
| Direction | Length | | Surface |
| Direction | m | ft | Surface |
|---|---|---|---|
| 09/27 | 730 | 2,395 | Sealed |
- Sources: AIP

Boigu Island Airport (IATA: GIC, ICAO: YBOI) is an airport serving Boigu Island in Queensland, Australia. It was officially opened as the Charlie Gibuma Memorial Airstrip on 26 July 1981 by Hon. Ken Tomkins, then Queensland Minister for Aboriginal and Island Affairs. The airport is operated by the Torres Strait Islands Regional Council.

Construction began in June 1979 and it was completed in 1981, following a trend of airstrip development in the area. In 2002, the unpaved runway was sealed, allowing continuous all-weather operations and improve regional connectivity.

== History ==
=== Construction & early operations ===
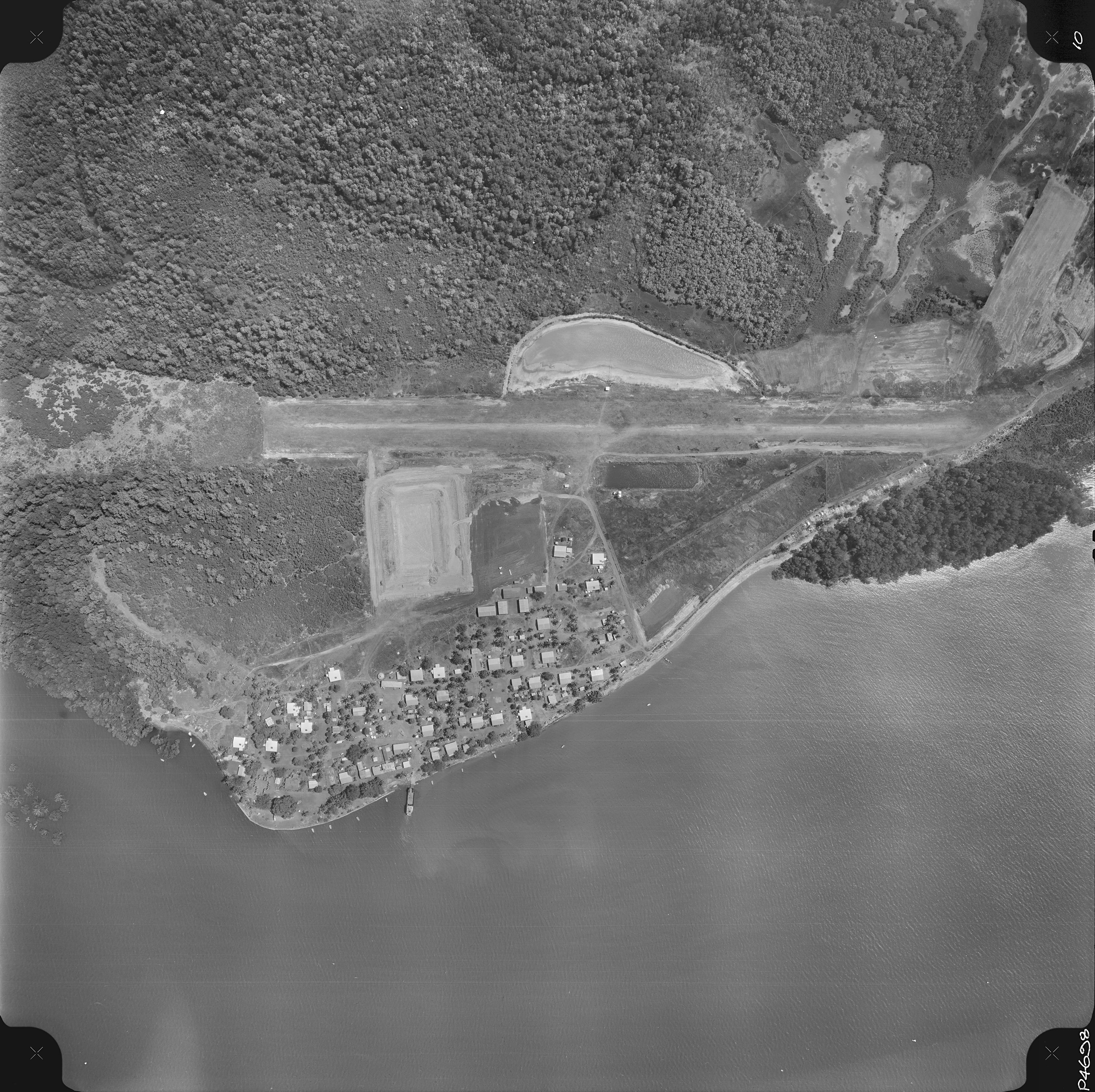
Aerial view of Boigu Airstrip and the community taken in 1 October 1987.

On 11 April 1972, works manager for Department of Aboriginal and Island Affairs Barney Chapman completed a surveying trip at Saibal, Boigu, and the far eastern islands, prospecting a future airstrip. In June 1979, the old school building for Boigu State School was demolished and replaced with a temporary shed to make way for the construction of an airstrip south from the community. As a result, three modular classrooms were purchased at a cost of $90,000. Additionally, two cultural sites were demolished for the airstrip; Koey May (well site) and former gardens. After two years of construction, the Hon. Ken Tomkins opened the airstrip on 26 July 1981. It was named the Charlie Gibuma Memorial Airstrip.

Every monsoon, the airstrip's surface would become dampened with muddy patches due to its fair-weather conditions. As a result, it would remain closed and isolate the community from external services. By 2002, six main aircraft operators serviced the airfield, resulting in 20 weekly movements.

=== Modernisation ===
Funded by $980,000, replacing the unpaved airstrip with an all-weather runway began in August 2002. The Commonwealth Government had contributed $330,000, while Queensland Transport provided $650,000 through the Rural and Remote Airport Development Program. During construction, works for the drainage system and ground surface were assisted by HEMTP trainees from the Boigu community. As a result, a 710 metre long bitumen runway and a paved apron was built, along with equipment and storage facilities. On 15 November 2002, construction was completed and announced by the Torres Strait Regional Authority. The official opening ceremony was held on 20 December of that year. The installation of airport fencing was completed in January 2016, under a broader funding package of $800,000. It was facilitated by the Torres Strait Regional Authority and Torres Strait Island Regional Council.

The installation for night lighting, passenger facilities, additional storage and maintenance facilities, and a car park have been included in the 2021 Boigu Island Master Plan. In 2025, the Crucial Access Links Program awarded $7.5 million to apron upgrades at Boigu Island Airport in response to the severe weather season during 2024-25.

== Facilities ==
The airport is at an elevation of 10 ft (3 m) above sea level. It has one runway designated 09/27 which is 730 m (2,395 ft) long.

== Airlines and destinations ==
| Airlines | Destinations |
|---|---|
| Hinterland Aviation | Horn Island, Saibai Island |

== Accidents & incidents ==
- On 25 March 1988, a Cessna 337-C (registered VH-EGX) crashed shortly after departing the airport. A witness reported that the aircraft had ascended one half to three quarters of the runway, climbing to 5-7 metres above ground level. Upon looking away, the aircraft later disappeared. It was discovered 300 metres from the runway in a tidal mangrove swamp, and the pilot had survived the incident. An investigation showed that the magnetos on the rear engine were not functioning prior to impact. The condition of the strip and pilot's low experience may have reduced the chance of the pilot noticing the abnormal aircraft performance.
- On 11 October 1993, a Cessna 210L (registered VH-BIL) had belly landed on the runway during a crosswind approach by a pilot undergoing a check by the operator. After bouncing three times, the aircraft was grounded from windshear as the landing gear was retracting when the pilot attempted to go around. The pilot was uninjured, and the Cessna was substantially damaged.
