= Murray Island Airport =

Airport in Queensland, Australia

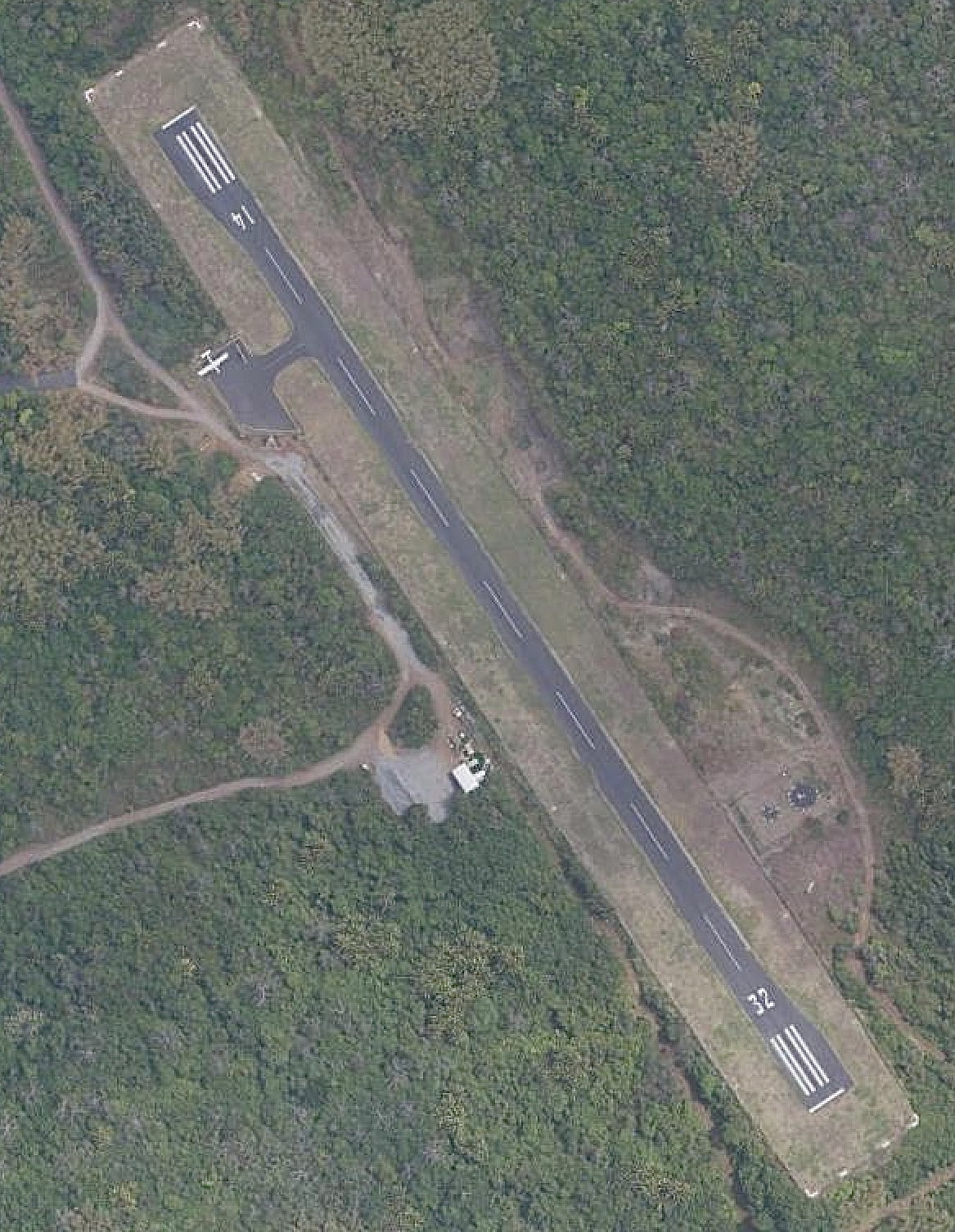
- Aerial view of Murray Island Airport taken in 20 September 2011.
- IATA: MYI; ICAO: YMAE

Summary
- Airport type: Public
- Location: Murray Island, Queensland, Australia
- Elevation AMSL: 330 ft (100 m)
- Coordinates: 09°54′53″S 144°03′15″E

Map
- Location in Queensland

Runways
Direction	Length		Surface
Direction	m	ft	Surface
14/32	525	1,722

Murray Island Airport (IATA: MYI, ICAO: YMAE) is an airport on Murray Island, in Queensland, Australia. Murray Island Airport was established in 1979 following two years of extensive construction works, involving the flattening and levelling of sloped terrain. In 2005, the airport received a sealed runway to support all-weather operations.

== History ==
=== Construction ===
In mid-1977, Queensland Premier Joh Bjelke-Petersen visited Murray Island, and construction of an airstrip soon followed. The construction was part of a broader initiative to providing airstrips to the area. In December 1977, an elevating scraper was purchased at a cost of $79,000 to assist in construction works. At the time, some heavy equipment and a single elevating scraper was utilised for construction works. During construction, the rugged terrain of the island was levelled by flattening a hill and using the fill to expand off a hill. As a result, it was regarded by Torres News as the "largest and most difficult construction jobs ever undertaken in the region." Barney Chapman served as the officer-in-charge of the airstrip's construction. On 30 October 1979, the airstrip was officially opened by Australian politician Charles Porter. During the ceremony, a plaque was unveiled and the new airstrip was given the name; Miriam Airport, selected by the Island Council. Following opening, the airstrip was to be used to support medical emergencies.

=== Modernisation ===
Beginning in 2005, a $1.6 million development commenced for Murray Island Airport. The project involved replacing the unpaved strip with an all-weather bitumen-surfaced runway. Construction was carried out by the Remote Communities Services Unit, providing employment for seven local trainees. In December 2005, the new runway was officially opened with a ribbon cutting ceremony.

== Airlines and destinations ==
Airlines	Destinations
Hinterland Aviation	Darnley Island, Horn Island, Yorke Island
Skytrans Airlines	Darnley Island, Horn Island, Yorke Island

== Accidents & incidents ==
- In 2014, the propellor of a Cessna 208B Grand Caravan (West Wing Aviation) clipped a fence, causing substantial damage. This was the only accident that occurred in 2014 involving low capacity RPT operations in Australia.

== See also ==
- List of airports in Queensland
