= Maximum elevation figure =

Type of visual flight rule (VFR) information

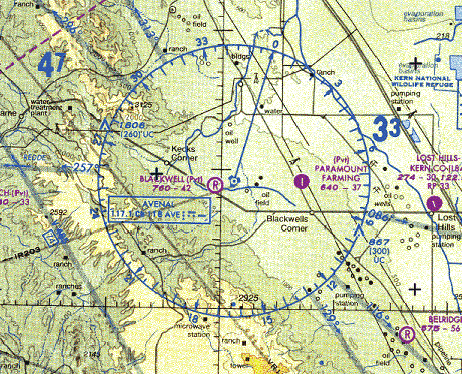
MEF's of 4700 and 3300 feet are shown on this excerpt from the FAA's Los Angeles sectional aeronautical chart.

Maximum elevation figure (MEF) is a type of visual flight rule (VFR) information that indicates the elevation of the highest geographical feature within a GEOREF quadrangle area. It is of interest to pilots, who want to be aware of the highest mountain peaks and tall towers nearby, so that they can fly above them to avoid controlled flight into terrain. ("Features" includes terrain, trees, towers, and other obstacles.)

Much like the minimum safe altitude (MSA) used for flight under instrument flight rules, the MEF includes a margin for aircraft clearance above the terrain and altimeter error.

In a VFR flight, the MEF is commonly referred to as a "quadrantal altitude" (not to be confused with an IFR minimum sector altitude).

== United States ==
In the US, the Federal Aviation Administration issues sectional charts. Each rectangular area covering one degree of latitude and one degree of longitude is divided into four smaller areas called quadrangles (in accordance with the World Geographic Reference System, or GEOREF), each spanning half a degree of latitude and half a degree of longitude. Each quadrangle has its MEF printed in it in thousands and hundreds of feet above mean sea level. For example, 10^{5}, means that the highest elevation is 10,500 feet within that quadrangle.

MEFs are determined by taking the highest of the following: 1) The point of highest terrain within a quadrangle, adding 200 ft for obstacles which are not required to be portrayed, and then adding 100 feet for vertical error and then rounding up to the next hundred feet; or 2) The height of the highest manmade obstacle in the quadrangle, adding 100 feet for vertical error and then rounding up to the next hundred feet.

== Canadian VNCs ==
The MEF on Canadian VFR navigation charts is calculated by taking the higher value of:

- the top elevation of the highest obstacle plus the vertical accuracy (a variable number of feet) of the terrain source data; or
- the elevation of the highest terrain plus 328 feet plus the vertical accuracy variable of the terrain source data.

== Australia ==
In Australia, Visual Navigation Charts (VNCs) and Visual Terminal Charts (VTCs) usually indicate MEF information by use of bold elevation figures for each grid. Pilots are also required to ensure their planned route does not contravene the minimum flying altitude regulations contained in CAR 167. This restriction is normally 1000FT above populated or built-up areas and 500FT elsewhere.

Procedures are different when flights are conducted under IFR, where LSALT is commonly used. LSALT may be determined in a number of ways as explained in the Australian Aeronautical Information Publication or AIP.

== See also ==
- Minimum safe altitude (for IFR flight), including area minimum altitudes (AMA)
