= Lowest safe altitude =

Altitude that is at least 500 feet above any obstacle or terrain

In aviation (particularly in air navigation), lowest safe altitude (LSALT) is an altitude that is at least 500 feet above any obstacle or terrain within a defined safety buffer region around a particular route that a pilot might fly. The safety buffer allows for errors in the air by including an additional area that a pilot might stray into by flying off track. By flying at or above this altitude a pilot complies with terrain clearance requirements on that particular flight leg.

== Australian definition ==
- The minimum LSALT is 1500 feet.
- LSALT is 1360 feet above the highest terrain where any obstacle thereon is less than 360 feet above the terrain, or there is no charted obstacle.
- LSALT is 1000 feet above the highest obstacle which is greater than 360 feet above the terrain.

For example, if there is an obstacle at 200 feet above terrain of 2500 feet, LSALT is 2500 feet (terrain height) + 1360 feet (clearance height), for an LSALT of 3860 feet; if there is an obstacle at 450 feet above terrain of 3600 feet, LSALT is 4050 feet (obstacle height) + 1000 feet (clearance height), or an LSALT of 5050 feet.

The differences in the clearance heights for obstacles is due to the potential for unreported obstacles up to 360 feet which are not marked on maps or charts.

The determination of which is the highest obstacle along the flight path depends on the method of navigation (radio navigation aid, dead reckoning or area navigation systems) and on the flight rules (instrument or night VFR)

== FAA definition ==
In the United States in particular, the Federal Aviation Administration calls this concept the minimum safe altitude (MSA), and is defined within the Federal Aviation Regulations (FAR):

1. Anywhere: an altitude allowing a safe emergency landing without undue hazard to person or property on the ground;
2. Over Congested Areas: an altitude of 1,000 feet above the highest obstacle within a horizontal distance of less than 2,000 feet;
3. Over Unpopulated Areas: an altitude of 500 feet AGL;
4. Over Open Water or Sparsely Populated Areas: an altitude allowing for a linear distance greater than 500 feet from any person, vessel, vehicle, or structure;
5. Helicopters: If without hazard to persons or property on the surface, an altitude lower than in definitions 2, 3, and 4 above, provided in compliance with any routes or altitudes specifically prescribed for helicopters by the FAA.

=== IFR flights ===
There are two restrictions on altitude which are important to IFR flight planning:

1. Minimum reception altitude (MRA), an altitude which must be maintained across a flight segment (i.e. between two navigation radio transmitters) in order to assure reception of the required radio signals at all portions of that segment.
2. Minimum obstacle clearance altitude (MOCA), an altitude which provides a predetermined vertical clearance from known obstacles within a predetermined corridor along the specified flight segment.

For a published procedure, the greater of these two altitudes is the altitude which must be adhered to during that segment, and is called the Minimum Enroute Altitude (MEA). However, on an IFR en route chart, an asterisk appears next to the MOCA if there is also a MRA on that part of the route that uses a significantly higher altitude. One may choose to fly the lower MOCA altitude, but must keep in mind navaid reception is unlikely. One may do this if utilizing GPS and does not require navaids to navigate and would like the lower altitude.

These altitudes are listed as "MSL" on IFR planning charts, and are thus the altitudes which would be indicated on the aircraft's barometric altimeter.

==== Area minimum altitudes ====
On Canadian IFR High- and Low-Level charts, area minimum altitudes (AMA) are published for quadrangle areas, which provide a buffer beyond the VFR maximum elevation figure. The AMA is the lowest off-airway altitude to be used under instrument meteorological conditions (IMC) that will provide a minimum vertical clearance of 1,000 feet (AGL), or in designated mountainous terrain 2,000 feet above all obstacles located in the area specified, rounded up to the nearest 100 foot increment.

=== VFR flights ===
Since VFR flights are not necessarily conducted on straight lines between ground-based radio navigation transmitters, the altitude restrictions for IFR flights are not applicable. Instead, a VFR flight can be conducted using pilotage, watching landmarks to determine position and desired direction. In this situation, the minimum reception altitude becomes moot, and the over-riding concern is for obstacle clearance.

Pilotage in the United States is usually accomplished with the use of sectional charts, which show the ground with considerable accuracy, both for terrain levels and for man-made objects. The charts are marked with World Geographic Reference System or GEOREF grids, and at the center of each grid square a number shows the elevation (MSL) of the highest obstacle within that grid (the maximum elevation figure or MEF). Thus a pilot is alerted of how high he must fly while traversing that grid to assure clearance of all possible obstacles. Then it is up to the pilot to select a cruising altitude which will provide the required clearance above those obstacles.

On sectional charts, man-made obstacles less than 200 feet in height may not be shown.

== See also ==
- List of aviation, avionics, aerospace and aeronautical abbreviations
- Index of aviation articles
- Above ground level
