= Queensland Regional Airlines =

Airline of Australia

IATA	ICAO	Call sign
Q7	—	—
- Founded: 2003
- Ceased operations: 2007
- Hubs: Cairns
- Fleet size: 4
- Destinations: 3
- Parent company: Australian Aviation Holdings
- Headquarters: Cairns, Queensland

Queensland Regional Airlines was an airline based in Cairns, Queensland, Australia. It was established and started operations in 2003 and operates passenger services, as well as contract and ad hoc charter and aircraft leasing. Its main base was Cairns International Airport.

== History ==
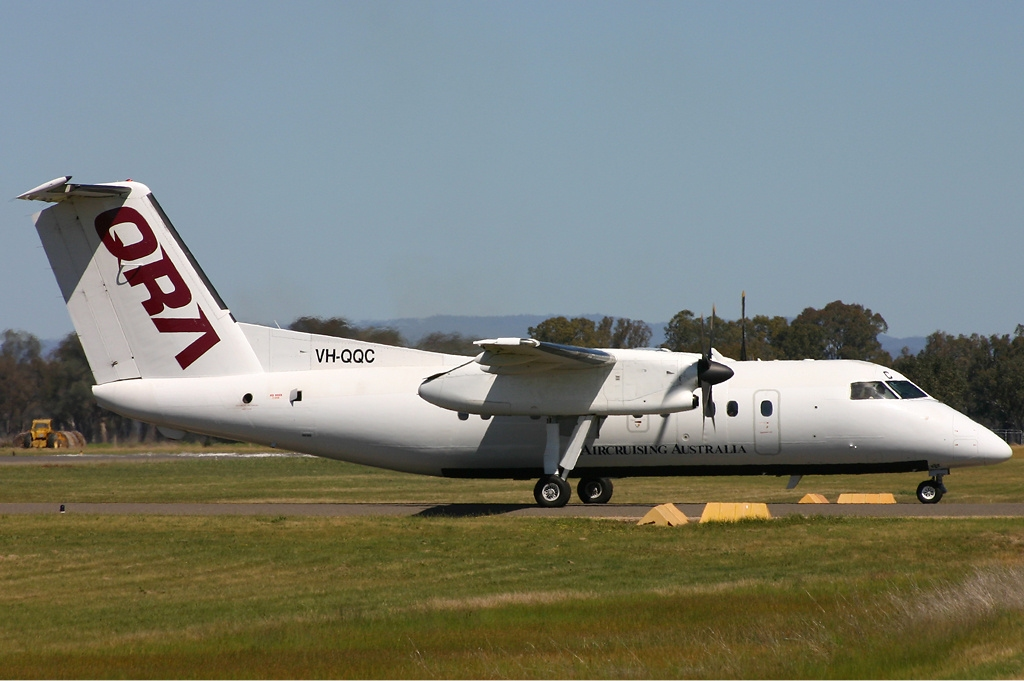
QRA Dash 8

The airline was launched by parent company, Australian Aviation Holdings (AAH), headquartered in Cairns, in 2002.

== Services ==
All Queensland Regional Airlines flights are now operated by Skytrans Airlines after the two airlines were merged by their parent company.

== Fleet ==
As of December 2006 the Queensland Regional Airlines fleet includes:

- 4 Bombardier Dash 8 Q100

For several years one aircraft has been on lease to Aircruising Australia during that company's flying season each year. Two different aircraft, VH-QQC and VH-QQE, have been used; currently VH-QQE is in Aircrusing service. These aircraft are now operated by Skytrans Airlines

== See also ==
- List of defunct airlines of Australia
- Aviation in Australia
