= Margaret Lawrie =

Margaret Elizabeth Lawrie, née Hayes (1917–2003) was famous for capturing and retelling many of the myths and legends of the Torres Strait Islander people. The Margaret Lawrie Collection is included in UNESCO's Australian Memory of the World Register.

== Biography ==
She was born in Victoria in 1917.

She studied English and music and later became a music teacher. Margaret married Ellis Lawrie who was a senator for Queensland. Margaret Lawrie became interested in a range of social issues in the course of assisting her husband. She was invited by the Queensland Government to travel with Oodgeroo Noonuccal and a Queensland Health worker to Cape York and Torres Strait Island communities to report on children’s health and other issues in these communities.

Margaret spent time in the communities during the 1950s, 1960s and early 1970s. A strength of the collection is the many Torres Strait Islander genealogies she documented of families living across the seventeen communities in the Torres Strait which she visited. They are used extensively for family history research and Native Title claims.

Between 1964 and 1973, she often stayed for months at a time and developed strong relationships with the people. Many approached her to record and write down their personal stories and family histories. This resulted in Margaret conducting research into the cultural history of the Torres Strait and collecting transcripts, audio recordings, photographs, slides, works of art and oral stories. Collectively they formed the basis of the publication Myths and legends of the Torres Strait (1970) and Tales from Torres Strait (1972).

During her various visits to the area she formed many friendships with the Torres Strait community. Because of her connections to the people she was approached to record some of the local myths and legends before they became lost. At this time, she had a close relationship with the Australian Institute of Aboriginal and Torres Strait Islander Studies and she undertook extensive recording of various oral histories under the sponsorship of the Institute.

== Margaret Lawrie Collection ==
Margaret Lawrie's Collection was donated to the State Library of Queensland in 1996. State Library digitised the genealogy charts and created an online index of the names that appear in the genealogies. Anyone can search the Margaret Lawrie Collection index records, but restrictions are placed on the digitised genealogy charts due to the private and sensitive nature of the material. Copies are provided to individuals and families researching their family history and to Land Councils for the purpose of Native Title claims upon the provision of a request on official letterhead showing the claim and claims number.

The Margaret Lawrie Collection complements the earlier work done by Alfred Haddon. His expedition team from Cambridge University visited the Torres Strait in 1898 publishing the results of their regional ethnography in six volumes between 1901 and 1935.

In 2008, the Margaret Lawrie Collection was added to UNESCO's Australian Memory of the World Register.
