= Transair (Australia) =

Airline of Australia

Transair was an airline based in Australia. The Civil Aviation Safety Authority cancelled the Air Operator's Certificate, at the request of Transair, on 4 December 2006. Transair ceased all operations from that date. This action followed investigations by the Civil Aviation Safety Authority and Australian Transport Safety Bureau into the airline's safety after the fatal accident of one of Transair's aircraft on 7 May 2005.

== Former code data ==
IATA Code: JT

== History ==
As of December 2006 the Australian Transport Safety Bureau has referred the owners of Transair, Lessbrook, to the director of public prosecutions for failing to report at least 25 incidents, as required by law, to the Bureau. These include seven reportable incidents between 1 July 2003 and the fatal crash on 7 May 2005, including gear failures, cabin pressurisation warnings and flap problems. Transair provided aircraft for the New South Wales regional airline Big Sky Express, operating from Sydney to Grafton, Taree, Gunnedah and Inverell. Transair was formally notified of the decision to suspend its Air Operators Certificate on 27 November 2006. As a result, Big Sky Express was forced to suspend airline operations and the majority of its routes were awarded to other regional airlines. The company no longer exists in Australia, but CEO Les Wright moved to Papua New Guinea where he continued operating Transair New Guinea.

== Incidents and accidents ==
- 7 May 2005 - A Fairchild Metro 23 crashed at Lockhart River, Queensland, killing both crewmembers and all 13 passengers aboard. This aircraft was operating under the name of Cairns-based company Aero-Tropics, which is also under investigation by the Civil Aviation Safety Authority (CASA.) Despite evidence that Transair's poor operational record and cost-cutting culture was a contributing factor to the Lockhart River crash, an Inquest by the Queensland Coroner found that Transair and its CEO/Chief Pilot/Check and Training Officer/Company Secretary had no responsibility for the incident.
- 31 August 2010 - Former Transair principal Les Wright was killed on Misima Island when his plane slid off an airstrip and crashed into trees.

== See also ==
- List of defunct airlines of Australia
- Aviation in Australia
