= Yorke Island Airport =

Airport in Queensland, Australia

- IATA: OKR; ICAO: YYKI

Summary
- Airport type: Private
- Operator: Torres Strait Island Regional Council
- Location: Yorke Island, Queensland
- Elevation AMSL: 10 ft (3.0 m)
- Coordinates: 09°45′08″S 143°24′16″E

Map
- Location in Queensland

Runways
Direction	Length		Surface
Direction	m	ft	Surface
12/30	1,000	3,281	Concrete
- Sources: Australian AIP and aerodrome chart

Yorke Island Airport (IATA: OKR, ICAO: YYKI) is an airport in Yorke Island, Queensland, Australia. It was established in 1971 initially as a fair-weather airstrip among a larger development scheme in the Torres Strait. In 1998, a new permanent runway was built, enabling year-round operations for the island.

== History ==
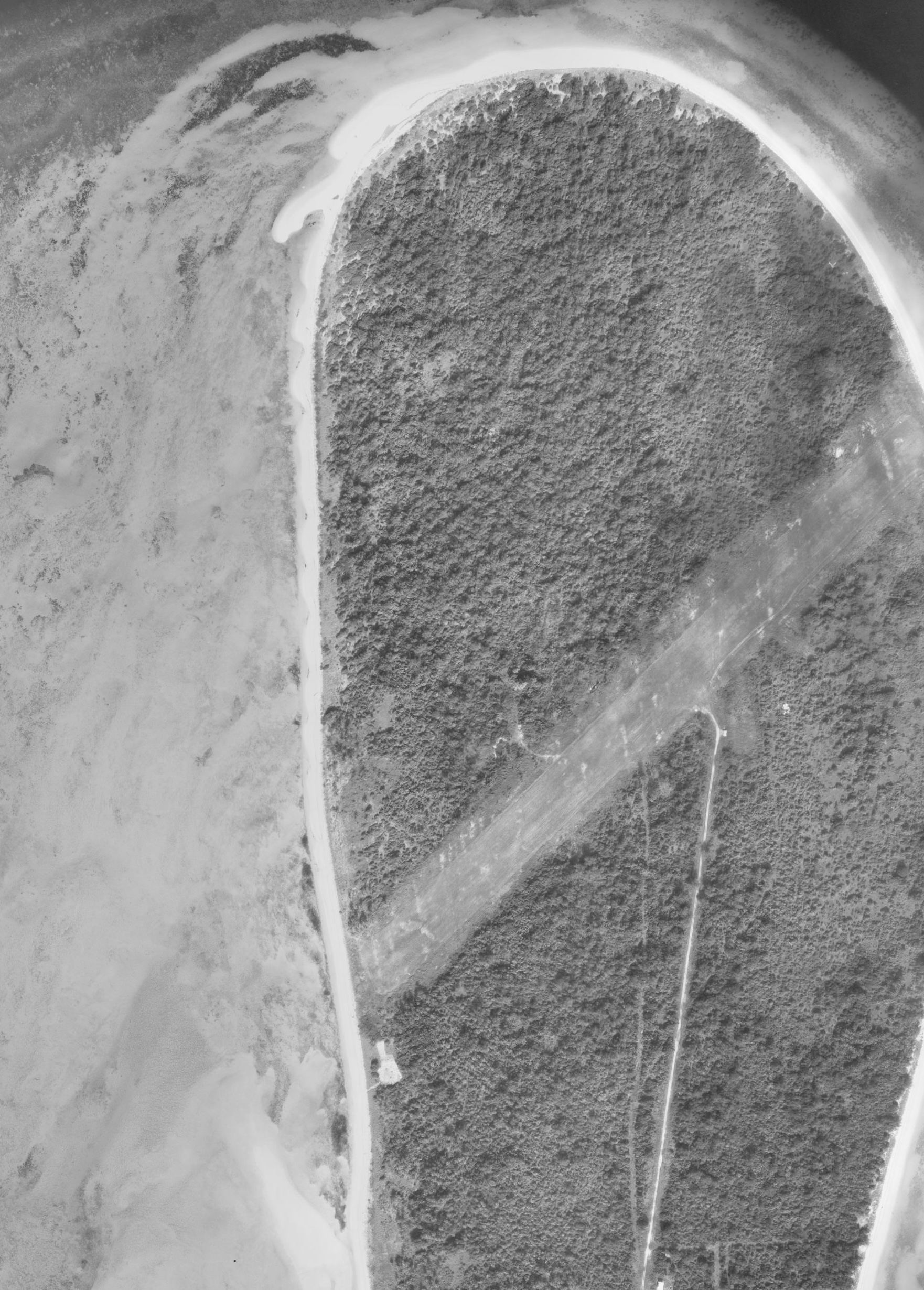
Aerial photo of Yorke Island Airstrip taken on 8 April 1974.

In October 1965, a request was made for the Queensland Government to improve aerial connectivity to the Torres Strait, which could support healthcare support for those living at Yorke Island and many others. Construction of Yorke Island Airport commenced on 24 August 1971 following years of preliminary assessments and surveying of the area. It followed the recently opened Badu Island Airport, the first of the scheme to be completed. Construction was assisted by volunteers from the islands of Murray, Darnley, Coconut, Sue, and Yam. The dirt airstrip only provided fair-weather operations, and would become dusty and pot-holed during dry weather while remaining operable during wet weather. On 1 May 1972, the airstrip was officially opened by the then Premier of Queensland, Joh Bjelke-Petersen.

=== Modernisation ===
In May 1998, construction began on a major $2.4 million upgrade of Yorke Island Airport to replace its fair-weather runway. Two local CDEP labour teams were deployed to work until completion. On 4 July 1998, construction was completed and the official opening ceremony was held on the 28th of that month. Upon completion, Yorke Island Chairman Joseph Mosby said to Torres News; "Everyone on Yorke is overjoyed with the new strip. I had to fight really hard to get the funding but we won at last." A 1,000 metre long and 18 metre wide runway was built using concrete blocks with plastic matting and pins. It had a lifespan of up to 20 years. The opening ceremony was attended by Federal Minister for Aboriginal and Torres Strait Islander Affairs, John Herron, and the then Queensland Minister for Transport, Steve Bredhauer. Following the event was an annual YDMS Sports Carnival involving students from Darnley, Murray, Stephen, and Yorke Islands.

== Airlines and destinations ==
Airlines	Destinations
Skytrans Airlines	Coconut Island, Horn Island, Murray Island, Yam Island

== Accidents & incidents ==
- On 31 March 2026, a Robinson R44 II (registered VH-HYR) collided with terrain as the pilot attempted an emergency landing. Prior, a low rotor RPM horn activated after reaching 100 ft from the airport. The pilot was severely injured in the accident, being airlifted to the Thursday Island Hospital afterwards.

== See also ==
- List of airports in Queensland
