= Minimum en route altitude =

Air regulation

Minimum en route altitude (MEA), alternately spelled as Minimum enroute altitude, is the lowest published altitude between radio navigation fixes that assures acceptable navigational signal coverage (see MRA) and meets obstacle clearance requirements (see MOCA) between those fixes.

The definition given here is that of the United States Federal Aviation Administration. Details may vary in other jurisdictions.

== Overview ==
The MEA prescribed for a Federal airway or segment, RNAV low or high route, or other direct route applies to the entire width of the airway, segment, or route. MEAs for routes wholly contained within controlled airspace normally provide a buffer above the floor of controlled airspace consisting of at least 300 feet within transition areas and 500 feet within control areas. MEAs are established based upon obstacle clearance over terrain and man-made objects, adequacy of navigation facility performance, and communications requirements, although adequate communication at the MEA is not guaranteed. The MEA does, however, assure acceptable navigational signal coverage and meets obstacle clearance requirements between those fixes.

== See also ==
- Above ground level
- Minimum safe altitude
