= Yam Island =

Island in Queensland, Australia

Native name: Yama; Iama Nickname: Turtle-backed Island
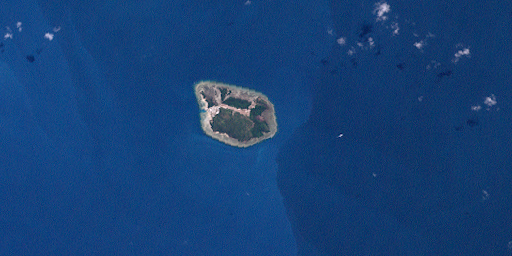
- Landsat image of Yam Island

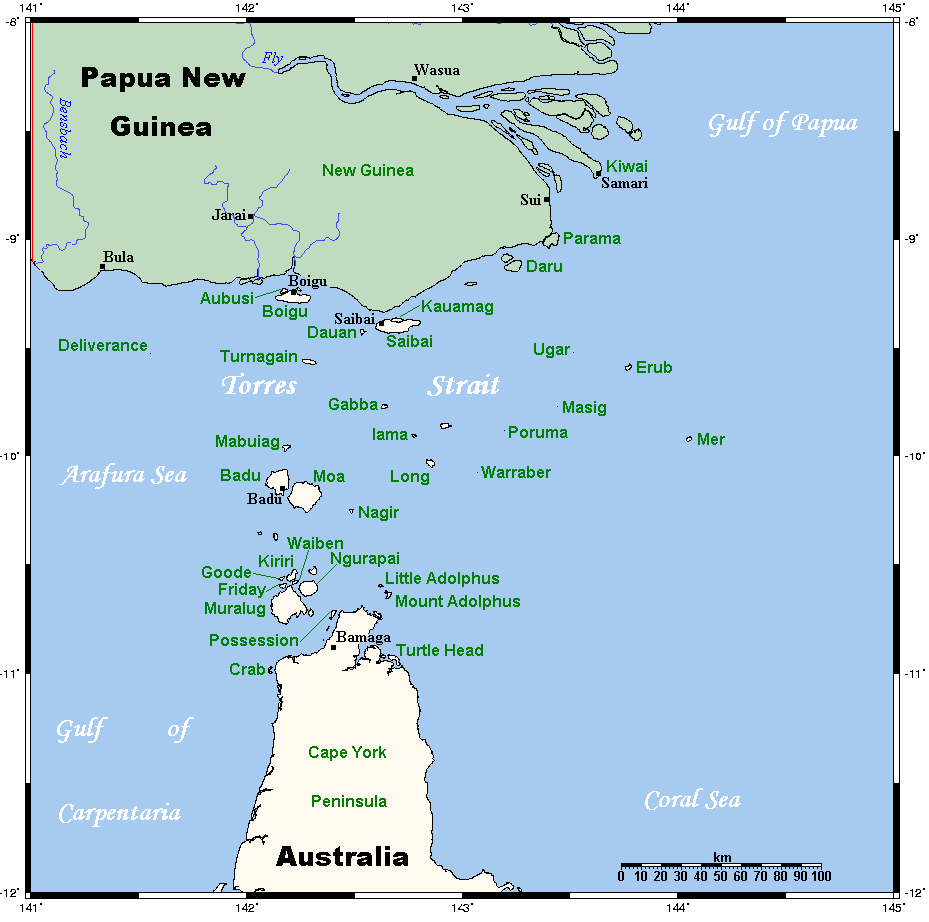
- A map of the Torres Strait Islands showing Yam Island in the central waters of Torres Strait

Geography
- Location: Tancred Passage, Northern Australia
- Coordinates: 9.9014°S 142.7750°E
- Archipelago: Bourke Isles group, Torres Strait Islands
- Adjacent to: Torres Strait
- Total islands: 1
- Area: 2 km^{2} (0.77 sq mi)

Administration
- Australia
- State: Queensland
- Local government area: Torres Strait Island Region

Demographics
- Ethnic groups: Torres Strait Islanders

Yam Island
- Suburb
- Interactive map of Yam Island
- Coordinates: 9.9011°S 142.7741°E
- Country: Australia
- State: Queensland
- LGA: Torres Strait Island Region

Government
  - State electorate: Cook
  - Federal division: Leichhardt

Area
  - Total: 1.9 km^{2} (0.73 sq mi)

Population
  - Total: 275 (2021 census)
  - Density: 145/km^{2} (375/sq mi)
- Time zone: UTC+10:00 (AEST)
- Postcode: 4875
Suburbs around Yam Island
Torres Strait	Torres Strait	Torres Strait
Torres Strait	Yam Island	Torres Strait
Torres Strait	Torres Strait	Torres Strait

Yam Island, called Yama or Iama in the Kulkalgau Ya language or Turtle-backed Island in English, is an island of the Bourke Isles group of the Torres Strait Islands, located in the Tancred Passage of the Torres Strait in Queensland, Australia. The island is situated approximately 100 kilometres (62 mi) northeast of Thursday Island and measures about 2 square kilometres (0.77 sq mi). The island is an official locality known as Iama Island within the local government area of Torres Strait Island Region. The town, also called Yam Island, is located on the north-west coast of the island. In the 2021 census, Iama Island had a population of 275 people.

Its indigenous language is Kulkalgau Ya, a dialect of the Western-Central Torres Strait language, Kalaw Lagaw Ya.

== Geography ==
The town on the island, also called Yam Island, is on the north-west coast (9.8994°S 142.7692°E).

Yam Island Airport is in the north of the locality (9.8993°S 142.7745°E).

== History ==
Mabuiag-Badu legends have Austronesian people from far-east Papua settled on Parema in the Fly Delta and married local trans-Fly women (of the group of peoples now called Gizra, Wipi, Bine, Meriam). Later they moved down to Torres Strait and settled on Yam Island, and then spread from there to different island groups. Westwards they went to Moa, Mabuiag, and there fought with local Aboriginal people and married some of the women, though apparently 'purists' who wanted to avoid further mixture moved north to Saibai, Boigu and Dauan. These initial settlements could have been anything up to around 2800 years ago. Eastwards they settled all the Central and Eastern Islands. They did not seem to have gone south to the Muralag group at this time. Much later, the Trans-Fly Meriam people of Papua moved to Mer, Erub and Ugar, taking most of the original inhabitants' land. These people, Western-Central Islanders, they called the Nog Le Common People, as opposed to the Meriam People, who are the noble people. Western-central Islanders in general are called the Gam Le Body People, as they are more thick-set on the whole than the slender Meriam.

This was the establishment of the Islanders as we know them today. Their languages are the mix of cultures mentioned above: the Western-Central language is an Australian (Paman) language with Austronesian and Papuan elements as cultural overlays, and the Eastern Language is dominantly Papuan, though with significant Australian and Austronesian elements.

According to Papuan legend, a developing mud island near the mouth of a river to the south of the Fly Delta was first settled by people from Yam Island (in Kulkalgau Ya/Kalaw Lagaw Ya the name of the island is Dhaaru (Daru)), before the time that the Kiwai conquered the coastal parts of the South-West Fly Delta (perhaps at most around 700 years ago). The Yama had long-established trading and family contacts with the Trans-Fly Papuans, starting from the original Papuo-Austronesian settlements. When the Kiwai people started raiding and taking over territory, some of the Yama escaped to the Trans-Fly Papuans on the mainland, and others went across to Saibai, Boigu and Dauan to join their fellow Islanders there. However, the majority wanted to keep their tribal identity, and so decided to get as far away from the Kiwai as possible, and headed to the far south of Torres Strait, and settled on Moa, Muri and the Muralag group. A small core of Yama people stayed on Daru, and became virtually absorbed by the Daru Kiwai. The Kiwai call these people the Hiàmo (also Hiàma, Hiàmu - a Kiwai 'mispronunciation' of Yama, while the Yama people that moved to the Muralag group called themselves the Kauralaigalai, alt. Kauraraigalai (Kaurareg), in their modern dialect Kaiwaligal 'Islanders', in contrast to the Dhaudhalgal 'Mainlanders of Papua' and the Kawaigal or Ageyal 'Aborigines of Australia' (who are also Dhaudhalgal 'Mainlanders').

The Kaiwaligal (Kaurareg) and the Kulkalgal (Central Islanders) still have a close relationship, and traditionally considered themselves as closely related, much more than either is to the Mabuiag-Badu people or the Saibai-Dauan-Boigu people. The Kulkagal (Yama and others) have also kept their traditional ties with the Trans-Fly people, and also now with the Kiwai, who after their beginning as conquerors, have now become a part of the traditional trade network.

European contact

The first recorded sighting by Europeans of Yam Island was by the Spanish expedition of Luís Vaez de Torres on 7 September 1606. It was charted as Isla de Caribes (Island of Caribs) because of the tall warriors that were found there. (Note: Don Diego Prado y Tovar, in his chronicles of the expedition, referred to the island as "isla de caribes muy grandes de a 12 palmos y medio" (island of very tall caribs of 12.5 spans) In the matter of the length of a span, palmo, there were different values in use in 1600; according to the sixteenth-century geographer and mathematician Petrus Apianus, a palmo was the stretch of four fingers, not including the thumb, or about 15 centimetres (5.9 in). This would give the natives of this island a height of up to 190 centimetres (75 in).) In 1792, they came aboard William Bligh's two ships seeking iron. Bligh named Tudu 'Warrior Island' after an attack they later made. The London Missionary Society established a station at Yam's western end making it possible for a permanent village with people settling around the mission. Many of the men took jobs on pearling luggers and a pearling station operated on Tudu during the 1870s with another at Nagi (Mount Ernest Island, southwest of Yam).

Pacific Islanders working at Nagi station later settled on Yam. During World War II, many Yam men enlisted in the army, forming C Company of the Torres Strait Light Infantry Battalion.

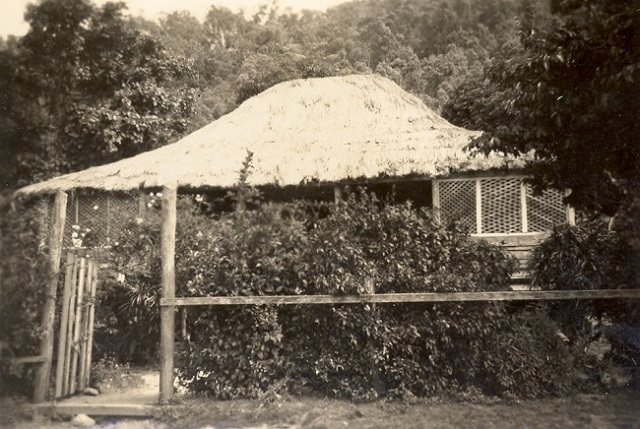
House on the island

Despite their seafaring background, Yam people were fairly isolated from the outside world until well after the war. An airstrip was constructed in 1974 and the island's connection to the Torres Strait telephone exchange occurred in 1980. Yam has provided the Torres Strait with important political leaders including Getano Lui (Snr) (grandson of the first LMS teacher, Lui Getano Lifu) and Getano Lui (Jnr), former chairman of the Island Coordinating Council.

In the 1950s, 1960s and early 1970s, Margaret Lawrie visited the Torres Strait, often staying for months at a time. Becoming friends with many Torres Strait Islanders she was approached by some to record and write down their stories as well as family histories. This resulted in Margaret conducting research into the cultural history of the Torres Strait and collecting transcripts, audio recordings, photographs, slides, art works and stories. Together they formed the basis for the publication of Myths and Legends of Torres Strait (1970) and Tales from Torres Strait (1972). This collection, which was added to the UNESCO Memory of the World Register in 2008.

Yam Island State School was opened on 29 January 1985. On 1 January 2007 it became the Yam Island Campus of the Tagai State College, which operates at 17 campuses throughout the Torres Strait.

== Demographics ==
Census Year	Population	Notes
2001 census	275	
2016 census	319	
2021 census	275	

== Education ==
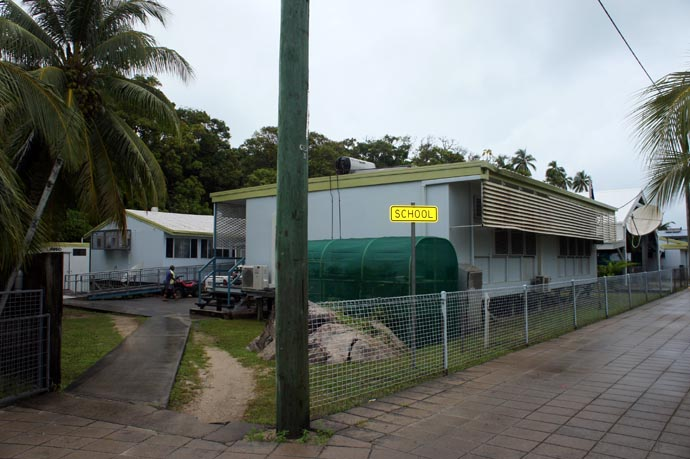
Yam Island campus, 2011

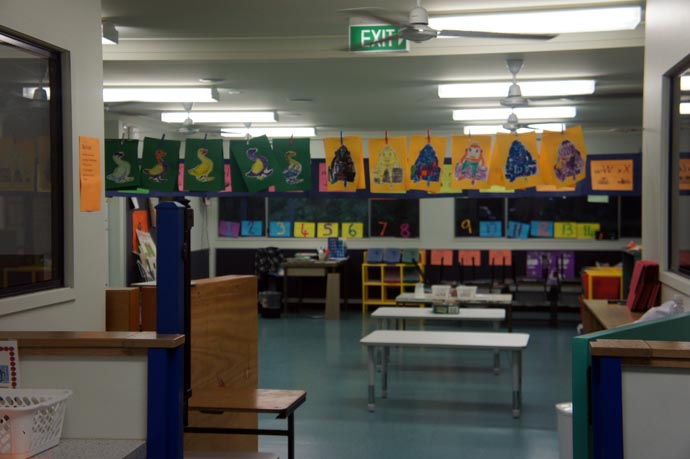
School classroom, 2011

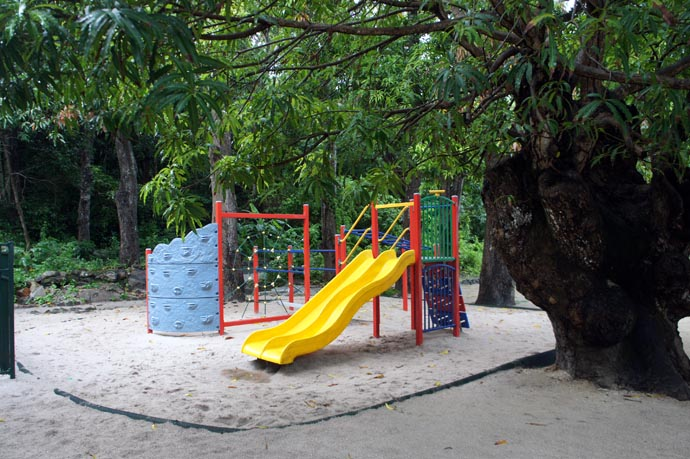
School playground, 2011

Yam Island Campus is a primary (Early Childhood-6) campus of Tagai State College. It is in Kebisu Street (9.8995°S 142.7696°E).

== Amenities ==
Torres Strait Island Regional Council operates the Dawita Cultural Centre on Church Road. On 26 July 2007, the centre was opened, including an Indigenous Knowledge Centre (IKC). The IKC was established in partnership with the council of the time, and the State Library of Queensland. In addition to providing a library service, the IKC is a space used by the community to revive, preserve, and share their culture through language, art, song, and dance. Several projects and programs have been delivered through the IKC, capturing stories and sharing knowledge.

Yam Island's state emergency service operates from Kebisu Street.

== Margaret Lawrie collection ==
The State Library of Queensland holds the Margaret Lawrie Collection of Torres Strait Islander material. This collection, which was added to the UNESCO Memory of the World Register in 2008, consists of material gathered by Margaret Lawrie on the Torres Strait Islander people's culture between 1964 and 1973.

As well as genealogies the collection also contains children's games, maps, music, photographs, plants, sketches, stories and vocabularies of the Torres Strait, such as the Badu, Mabuiag, Thursday Island, Bamaga (located on the mainland), Muralag (Prince of Wales Island), Ugar, Boigu Island, Murray Island, Warraber, Dauan Island, Naghir (Mount Ernest Island), Yam Island, Erub (Darnley Island), Poruma (Coconut Island), Yorke Island, Horn Island, Saibai Island, Kubin Village / St Pauls (Moa Island) and Seisia (located on the mainland).

== Notable people ==
Notable people who are from or who have lived on Yam Island include:

- Margaret Lawrie (1917–2003)
- Ethel May Eliza Zahel (1877–1951), teacher and public servant.
- Maino Kebisu, leader, statesman, and storyteller

== See also ==
- List of Torres Strait Islands
- Yam Island Airport
