= World Geographic Reference System =

Grid-based method of specifying locations

The World Geographic Reference System (GEOREF) is a geocode, a grid-based method of specifying locations on the surface of the Earth. GEOREF is essentially based on the geographic system of latitude and longitude, but using a simpler and more flexible notation. GEOREF was used primarily in aeronautical charts for air navigation, particularly in military or inter-service applications, but it is rarely seen today. However, GEOREF can be used with any map or chart that has latitude and longitude printed on it.

== Quadrangles ==
GEOREF is based on the standard system of latitude and longitude, but uses a simpler and more concise notation. GEOREF divides the Earth's surface into successively smaller quadrangles, with a notation system used to identify each quadrangle within its parent. Unlike latitude/longitude, GEOREF runs in one direction horizontally, east from the 180° meridian; and one direction vertically, north from the South Pole. GEOREF can easily be adapted to give co-ordinates with varying degrees of precision, using a 2–12 character geocode.

GEOREF co-ordinates are defined by successive divisions of the Earth's surface, as follows:

- The first level of GEOREF divides the world into quadrangles each measuring 15 degrees of longitude by 15 degrees of latitude; this results in 24 zones of longitude and 12 bands of latitude. A longitude zone is identified by a letter from A to Z (omitting I and O) starting at 180 degrees and progressing eastward through the full 360 degrees of longitude; a latitude band is identified by a letter from A through M (omitting I) northward from the south pole. Hence, any 15 degree quadrangle can be identified by two letters; the easting (longitude) is given first, followed by the northing (latitude). These two letters are the first two characters of a full GEOREF coordinate.
- Each 15-degree quadrangle is further divided into smaller quadrangles, measuring 1 degree of longitude by 1 degree of latitude. These quadrangles are lettered A to Q (omitting I and O), running from west to east for longitude; and A to Q (omitting I and O), running south to north for latitude. These letters form the third and fourth characters of a full GEOREF coordinate. Four letters thus identify any 1-degree quadrangle in the world.
- Each of the 1-degree quadrangles is further subdivided into 60 1-minute longitude zones, numbered 00 through 59 from west to east, and 60 1-minute latitude bands, numbered 00 to 59 from south to north. These numbers are always written as two digits, with a leading zero if necessary, and the easting is always followed by the northing. Thus, 4 letters and 4 digits give the position of any 1-minute quadrangle.
- Each of the 1-minute quadrangles may be further divided into 10 or 100 smaller divisions both north–south and east–west, permitting the identification of 0.1-minute or 0.01-minute quadrangles. The GEOREF coordinate for any 0.1-minute quadrangle consists of four letters and six numbers; the GEOREF coordinate for any 0.01-minute quadrangle consists of four letters and eight numbers.

The initial two letters of a GEOREF reference, designating the 15 degree quadrangle, can be omitted, if it is clear which 15 degree quadrangle the reference applies to (e.g., when working within a restricted geographical area).

=== Example ===
The GJ local grid

For example, on a GEOREF chart, Naval Air Station Patuxent River (38°17′10″N 76°24′42″W) / (38.286108, -76.4291704) is located (to the nearest minute) at position GJPJ3417.

To locate the position from the coordinates, proceed as follows:

- Right from 180° longitude to longitude zone G
- Up from the South Pole to latitude zone J
- Right in zone GJ to the lettered 1° column P
- Up in zone GJ to the lettered 1° row J
- Right in the 1° horizontal zone to 34 minutes
- Up in the 1° vertical zone to 17 minutes

The same co-ordinate shown in 6-digit (1/10 minute) format is GJPJ342171 and in 8-digit (1/100 minute) format is GJPJ34241716.

== Designation of area ==
Extensions to the above notation allow the GEOREF system to be used to designate an area around a reference point. This is achieved by adding an area designation to a base GEOREF co-ordinate. The area designation can be the letter S, to specify the sides of a rectangle (separated by the letter X); or the letter R, to specify the radius of a circle. In both cases the units are nautical miles. In addition, the letter H can be added, followed by an altitude in thousands of feet.

For example, the reference GJQJ0207S6X8 designates a rectangle centered on Deal Island (GJQJ0207), running 6 nautical miles (11 km) east–west and 8 nautical miles (15 km) north–south. Designation GJPJ4103R5 means a circle around Point Lookout (GJPJ4103) with a radius of 5 nautical miles (9 km). Designation GJPJ3716H17 means a height of 17,000 feet over GJPJ3716.

== See also ==
- List of geodesic-geocoding systems
- Global Area Reference System (GARS)
- Maximum elevation figure correlated to each GEOREF quadrangle on VFR aviation maps
- Military Grid Reference System (MGRS)
- Area minimum altitudes on IFR charts
