= Hinterland Aviation =

Australian regional airline

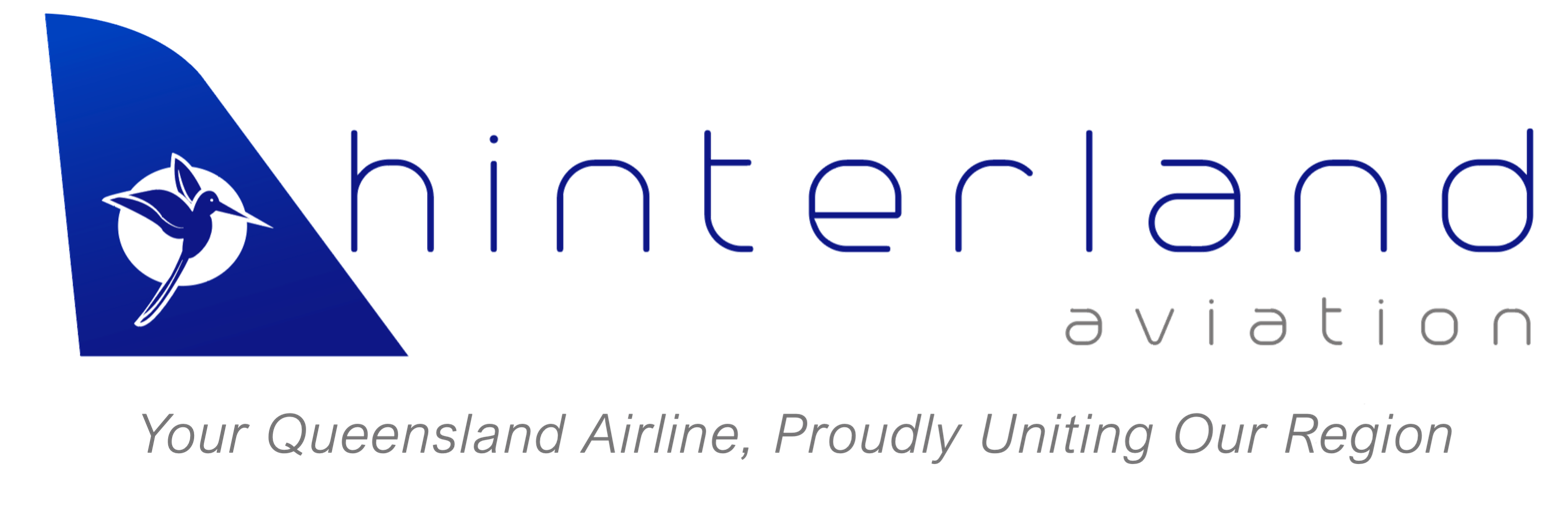
IATA	ICAO	Call sign
OI	HND	HINTERLAND
- Founded: 11 May 1984
- Hubs: Cairns Airport; Townsville Airport; Horn Island
- Fleet size: 14
- Destinations: 20
- Headquarters: Cairns, Australia
- Key people: Andrew Clair – CEO; Tristan Cabello – COO
- Employees: ~100
- Website: hinterlandaviation.com.au

Hinterland Aviation is a regional airline headquartered at Cairns Airport in Queensland, Australia. The airline operates scheduled passenger services from Cairns, Horn Island, and Townsville, as well as charter services.

== History ==
Hinterland Aviation was established on 11 May 1984. Since then, it has expanded operations to include both scheduled and charter flights. It operates more than 8,000 flights annually, carrying over 120,000 passengers on its regular public transport network and charter flights per year.

== Fleet ==
As of November 2025, Hinterland Aviation’s fleet includes the following aircraft:

Aircraft	Total	Orders	Passengers	Notes
Cessna C208 Caravan 208B & EX	14	—	12	Includes EX models.
Cessna 408 SkyCourier	—	2	19	Hinterland is the first Australian customer, with deliveries expected in 2026.
Total	14	2		

== Destinations ==
As of August 2025, Hinterland Aviation operates scheduled services to the following destinations:

=== From Cairns Airport ===
- Kowanyama
- Pormpuraaw
- Cooktown
- Coen
- Lockhart River

=== From Townsville Airport ===
- Palm Island

=== From Horn Island Airport ===
- Kubin Village (Moa Island)
- Badu Island
- Mabuiag Island
- Boigu Island
- Saibai Island
- Murray Island
- Darnley Island
- Yam Island
- Coconut Island
- Yorke Island
- Warraber Island

Some of the Torres Strait routes were introduced after the withdrawal of Skytrans from several islands, with Hinterland taking over to maintain air connectivity in the region.

== See also ==
- List of airlines of Australia
