= Torres Strait Regional Authority =

Australian government body

Regional authority overview
- Formed: 1 July 1994
- Jurisdiction: Torres Strait Islands
- Annual budget: $39.14 million AUD (2018–19)
- Minister responsible: Malarndirri McCarthy, Minister for Indigenous Australians
- Regional authority executives: Vonda Malone, Chief Executive Officer; Napau Pedro Stephen AM, Board Chairperson
- Website: tsra.gov.au

The Torres Strait Regional Authority is an Australian Government body established in 1994 to administer the Torres Strait Islands. It consists of 20 elected representatives. The primary function of the authority is to strengthen the economic, social and cultural development of the peoples of the Torres Strait area.

== The islands ==
The Torres Strait Islands lie to the north of Tropical Queensland's Cape York Peninsula and comprise 274 small islands, of which 17 are inhabited, located in Torres Strait which separates Australia and Papua New Guinea. Each island community elects a member to the Torres Strait Regional Authority.

Thursday Island (Waiben) and Horn Island (Nurupai) are the most well-known of the Torres Strait Islands. Activities on the islands are quite traditional, with fishing being the major economic activity. To travel to the remote islands (other than Thursday and Horn Islands) permission is required from the Torres Strait Island Regional Council.

The five major island groups of the Torres Strait include:

- Northern Division (Boigu, Dauan, Saibai)
- Eastern Islands (Darnley, Murray, Stephen)
- Western Division (St. Pauls, Kubin, Badu, Mabuiag)
- Central Division (Yorke, Coconut, Warraber, Yam)
- Southern Division (TI and Inner Islands, NPA and Mainland Australia)

== History ==
The authority was established in 1994, as a separate authority from the Aboriginal and Torres Strait Islander Commission, to deliver better services and programs to the Torres Strait Islander people living on the Islands.

Together with the Island Co-ordinating Council, the Torres Strait Regional Authority has been active in implementing community based management strategies. The adoption of a Marine Strategy for the monitoring and management of dugong and turtle populations in the seas around the islands was undertaken in 1999.

A 2001 evaluation found that employment and housing were the two areas of greatest need for improvement, being even worse than that of Torres Strait Islander people on the mainland and Australian Aboriginal people. However, in most other areas, such as health, cultural integrity and crime, the people on Islands fared better.

The Torres Strait Regional Authority's 2001 Bamaga Accord, which proposed a new regional governance framework for the Islands, was an expression of the people's aspiration to have greater autonomy.

In 2006, successful lobbying by the authority and the Island Co-ordinating Council resulted in the granting of $300,000 from the Federal Government to study the risks of climate change on the six largest Torres Strait Islands.

In 2010, after a nine-year legal battle, the Torres Strait Regional Authority made a successful native title claim to 40,000 km² of sea between Cape York Peninsula and Papua New Guinea. This was the largest native title claim in Australia's history.

The Torres Strait Territory Coalition was formed in 2010, by the elected leaders of the Torres Strait Island Regional Council, the Torres Strait Regional Authority and the Torres Shire Council, with the aim of gaining official Territory status for the Torres Strait Islands. The plan would see the Torres Strait Regional Authority and local governments in the area abolished, but this has not come to pass.

== Governance ==
The Torres Strait Regional Authority consists of 20 elected representatives, with its primary function being to strengthen the economic, social and cultural development of the peoples of the Torres Strait area.

The Torres Strait Regional Authority board is led by a chair of the Torres Strait Regional Authority and a deputy chair. The current chair is Napau Pedro Stephen. The day-to-day functions of the Torres Strait Regional Authority are carried out by an Administration Department led by a chief executive officer, currently Vonda Malone.

=== Chairs ===
- 1 July 1994 – March 1997: Getano Lui (Jnr) (b. 1952)
- March 1997 – 19 April 2000: John Abednego
- 19 April 2000 – May 2004: Terry Waia
- May 2004 – November 2012: John Toshie Kris
- November 2012 – September 2016: Joseph Elu
- September 2016 – Present: Napau Pedro Stephen

== See also ==
- Torres Strait Island Region (a Queensland LGA)
- List of Australian government entities
