= Skytrans Australia =

Australian airline

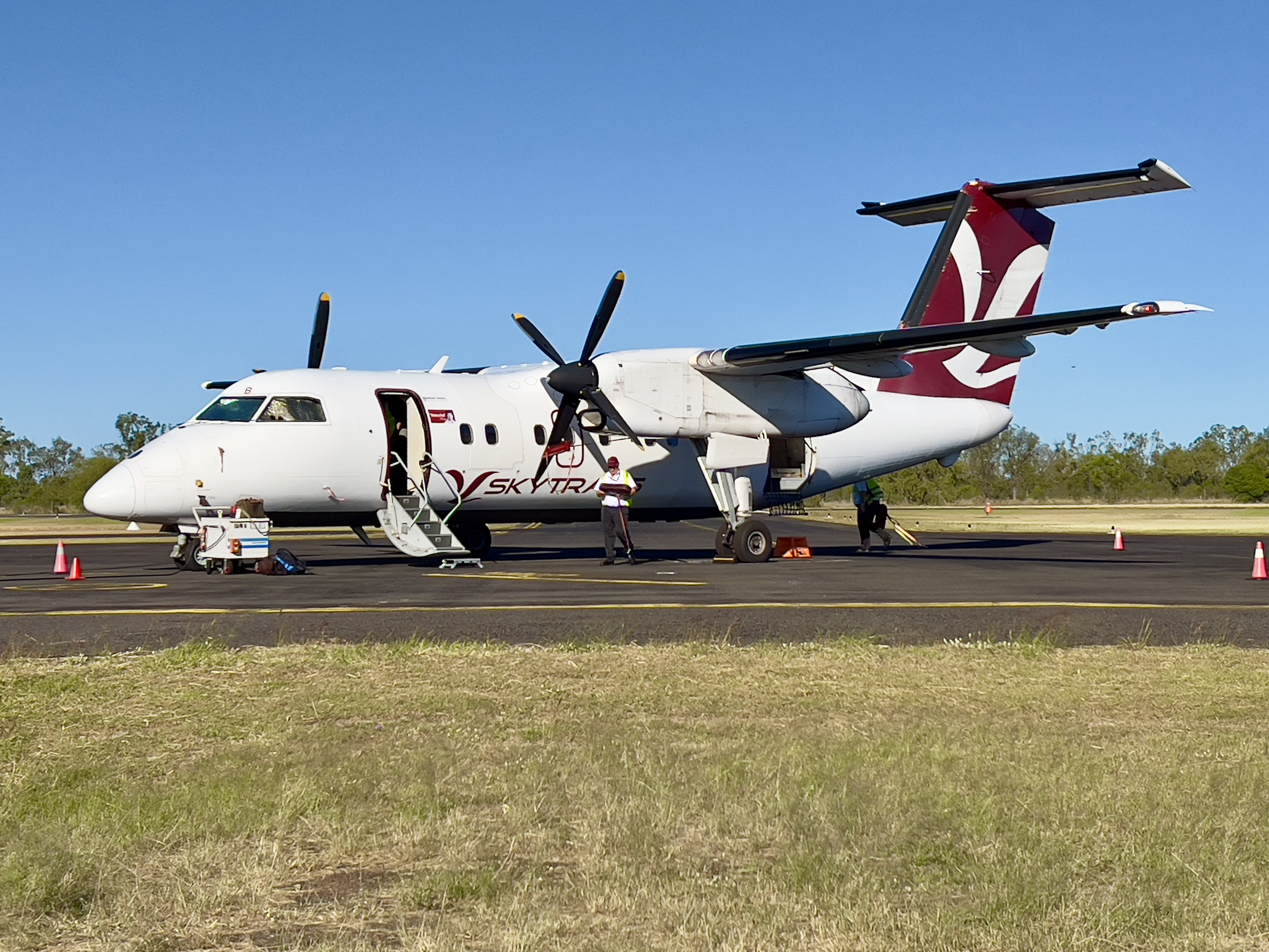
- Skytrans Dash 8-100
IATA	ICAO	Call sign
QN	SKP	SKYTRANS
- Founded: October 1990
- Commenced operations: 1993; 1 April 2015
- Operating bases: Brisbane; Cairns
- Fleet size: 11
- Destinations: 14
- Parent company: Avia Solutions Group
- Headquarters: Cairns, Queensland, Australia
- Key people: Gytis Gumuliauskas (Managing Director & CEO)
- Founders: David & Sue Barnard
- Website: skytrans.au

Skytrans Australia (founded as Skytrans) is an Australian airline and air charter business based in Cairns, Rockhampton and Townsville, in Queensland. The airline operates RPT (Regular Public Transport), charter and ACMI (Aircraft, Crew, Maintenance and Insurance) services in Cairns, Horn Island, Brisbane, Rockhampton and Townsville.

On 31 March 2015, two months after being placed into administration, the company returned to the skies. As of March 2024, the airline is now owned by European-based Avia Solutions Group.

== History ==
Skytrans was founded by David and Sue Barnard in October 1990 as a charter airline, and began scheduled flights in 1993. In November 2000, Skytrans merged with AirSwift Aviation, another small regional airline based in Cairns. In June 2001, Skytrans took over services to Cooktown and Karumba from MacAir Airlines. In January 2005, the airline began to operate in competition with QantasLink on the Cairns to Townsville route, operating from its own terminals in both cities.

In December 2006, the airline was acquired from its founders by Australian Aviation Holdings, owner of Queensland Regional Airlines (QRA) and Inland Pacific Air. Skytrans and QRA subsequently merged under the Skytrans Regional brand.

Late in 2014, the carrier had sought to reduce costs by cutting its workforce of 200 employees by over half while trimming its fleet of seven Dash 8-100s and three Dash 8-300s.

Skytrans suspended operations with effect from 2 January 2015 when it was placed in voluntary administration. In a statement, Managing Director Simon Wild blamed the worsening Australian dollar currency exchange rate, coupled with a tough operating environment – worsened by the loss of three Queensland regulated regional air routes in late 2014. The end of operations came a day after the carrier marked its 25th anniversary of Queensland services - outback and regional Queensland, the Gulf country, and Cape York services on 2 January 2015.

On 31 March 2015, Skytrans returned to the skies under the ownership of Collings Holdings Airlines owned by Peter Collings, who also owns West Wing Aviation, and former Australian Rugby League player, Johnathan Thurston.

In January 2024, the world's largest ACMI (Aircraft, Crew, Maintenance, and Insurance) provider, Avia Solutions Group, announced its intention to acquire ownership of Skytrans, with the acquisition completed in March 2024.

Since the acquisition, Gytis Gumuliauskas, has become managing director at Skytrans. Gytis has extensive experience within the aviation industry, covering various positions across both airlines and aviation services companies. Since 2006, he has held managerial positions including Lead Auditor ISAGO, IATA DAQCP, Nominated Post Holder Ground Operations, COO, CEO and Accountable Manager. Gytis' academic background is in aviation mechanics and now he specialises in developing and executing business strategies and transformational change.

In April 2024, Avia Solutions announced their plans for Skytrans to operate a fleet of up to 20 aircraft from the Airbus A320 family for wet leasing operations, with the total number of A320 aircraft dependent on customer demand. Gytis, said that "Passenger operations will be our main area of focus, with cargo being an area we're willing to explore... [by] expanding the fleet with A319 aircraft for passenger and with A321F for cargo transportation."

On 28 October 2024, QantasLink and Skytrans announced a partnership for the continued operation of Lord Howe Island flights. This would see QantasLink's three De Havilland Canada Dash 8-200 acquired by Skytrans for them to carry out these operations. These flights will be code-shared by Qantas, with the flights to operate out of Qantas Terminal 3 at Sydney Airport. Skytrans will fully takeover the service on the 26 February 2026 with the license to operate the route until March 2030.

On 9 May 2025, Skytrans ended its service to 11 Torres Strait Islands and retired all Cessna 208B Caravans. An agreement was reached with Northern Territory Air Services and Hinterland Aviation to continue to provide services to these remote communities.

Between 24 June 2025 and 10 February 2026, Skytrans was rebranded and known as SmartLynx Australia, aligning the company with sister airlines under the Avia Solutions Group. However, following the collapse of SmartLynx Airlines, Avia Solutions Group announced its divestment from the SmartLynx brand entirely. This resulted in SmartLynx Australia returning to its original Skytrans brand, featuring a new logo.

== Fleet ==
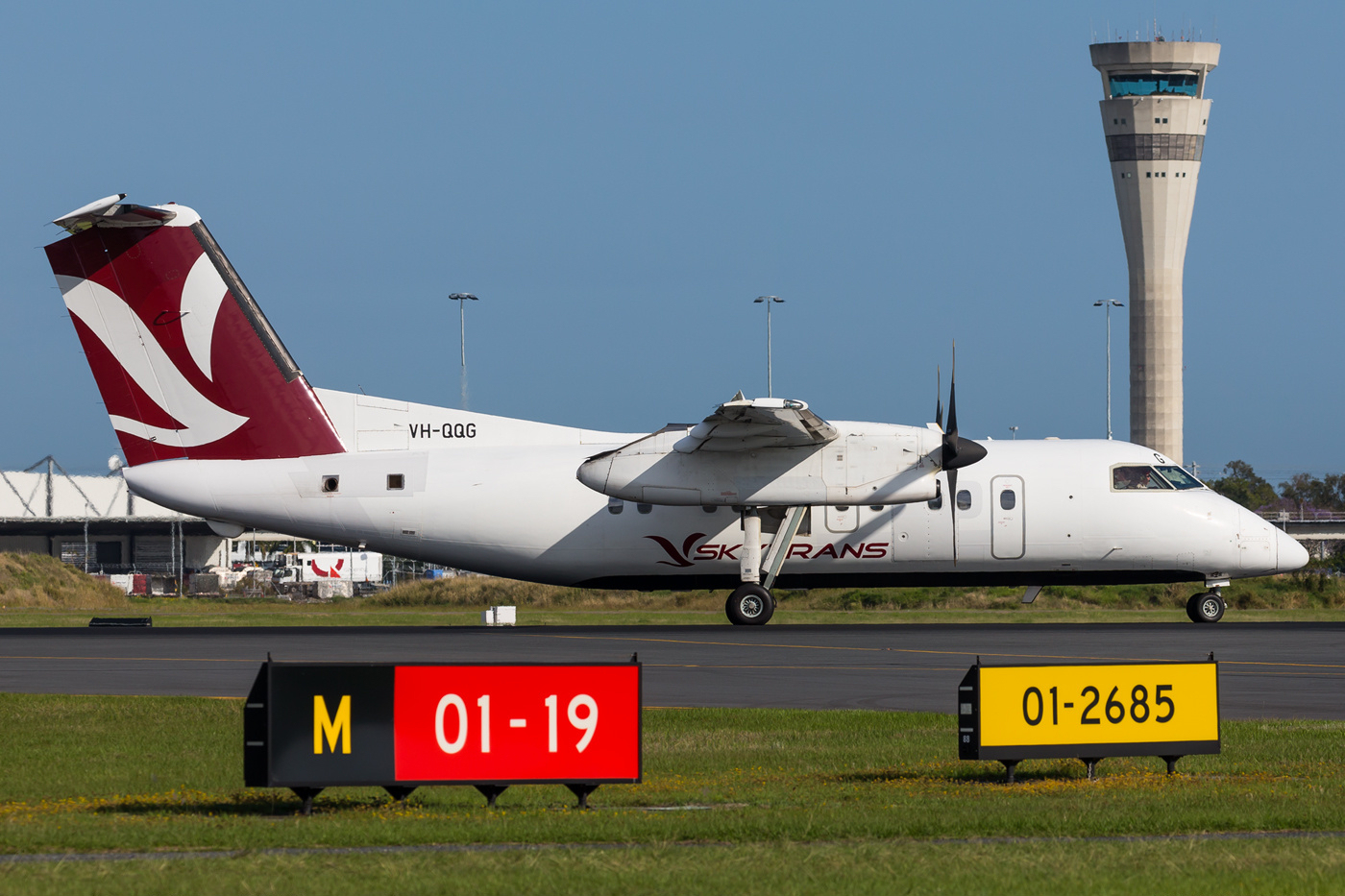
Skytrans Dash 8-100 at Brisbane Airport

As of February 2026, Skytrans Australia operates the following aircraft:

Aircraft	In service	Orders	Passengers	Notes
Airbus A319-100	1	—	138	Plans to operate up to 20 A320 family aircraft for wet leasing operations.
De Havilland Canada Dash 8-100	5	—	36	
De Havilland Canada Dash 8-200	2	—	36	Former QantasLink aircraft.
De Havilland Canada Dash 8-300	2	—	50	
Total	10	—		

== Destinations ==
Skytrans Australia operates RPT and charter flights throughout the Cape York and Torres Strait regions. Skytrans also provides charter flights out of Brisbane, Rockhampton, and Townsville airports for both the Queensland Gas Company (QGC) and Bravus Mining Resources.

Destinations served from Cairns Airport:

- Kowanyama
- Pormpuraaw
- Townsville
- Aurukun
- Lockhart River
- Horn Island
- Bamaga
- Proserpine
- Rockhampton
- Moranbah

Destinations served from Horn Island Airport:

- Cairns
- Lockhart River
- Bamaga

Destinations served from Brisbane Airport:

- Chinchilla
- Miles

Destinations served from Whitsunday Coast:

- Rockhampton
- Townsville

Destination served from Sydney Airport:

- Lord Howe Island
- Cobar (seasonal)

=== Codeshare agreements ===
Skytrans has codeshare agreements with the following airline:

- Qantas

== Sponsorships ==
Skytrans Australia has delivered multimillion-dollar sponsorships and endorsements to communities in Queensland, donating to more than 250 organisations. Skytrans is a major sponsor of the Cairns Taipans in the Northern Pride Rugby Team in the QRL Queensland Rugby League and has supported various causes such as AFL Kickstart, Choice Business Australia, The Queensland Cancer Council, and Harold's House.

== See also ==
- List of airlines of Australia
