= Tanu =

Tanu may refer to:

== People ==
- Malietoa Tanumafili I (1879–1939), Samoan prince
- Tanu Nona (1902–1980), Australian pearler and politician
- Tanu Roy (born 1980), Indian actress and model

== Places ==
- Tanganyika African National Union (TANU)
- Tanu (Haida village), a village of the Haida people on Haida Gwaii, British Columbia, Canada
- Tanu, Canada, a National Historic Site of Canada in British Columbia
- Tanu, Sarawak, Malaysia, a town near Tusor
- Tanu Forest Park, Gambia

== Other uses ==
- A tanu (The Witness), a 1969 Hungarian film
- CCGS Tanu, a Canadian fisheries patrol vessel
- Pseudophilautus tanu, a frog of the family Rhacophoridae
- Tanu, a character in the children's fantasy novel Fablehaven by Brandon Mull
- The Tanu, a race from the Saga of Pliocene Exile book series by Julian May

== See also ==
- Le Tanu, a commune in the Manche department, France
- Tanus (disambiguation)
