= Torres Strait Air =

Australian airline

IATA	ICAO	Call sign
-	-	-
- Founded: 2013
- Fleet size: 11
- Destinations: 20
- Headquarters: Horn Island, Queensland, Australia
- Key people: Daniel Takai (Chief Executive Officer)
- Website: torresair.com

Torres Strait Air is an Australian airline based in Horn Island, Queensland, Australia, offering charter services between to the Torres Strait Islands and Cape York Peninsula islands. It also provides charter services between the region and Papua New Guinea.

== Fleet ==
Torres Strait Air fleet
Aircraft	In service	Orders	Passengers	Notes
Aero Commander 500S	1	-	6	
Britten-Norman BN-2 Islander	7	10	9	
Cessna 206	3	-	5	
Total	11	10		

=== Former fleet ===
Torres Strait Air previously operated the following aircraft.

- Cessna 208 - 1 aircraft (2016–2020)

== Destinations ==
As of 2024, Torres Strait Air offered services to the following destinations:

- Queensland, Australia
  - Aurukun
  - Badu Island
  - Bamaga
  - Boigu Island
  - Cairns
  - Coconut Island
  - Darnley Island
  - Horn Island
  - Kowanyama
  - Mabuiag Island
  - Moa Island
  - Lockhart River
  - Murray Island
  - Pormpuraaw
  - Saibai Island
  - Warraber Island
  - Weipa
  - Yam Island
  - Yorke Island
- Papua New Guinea
  - Daru

== Incidents ==
- On 3 October 2022, a Britten-Norman Islander BN-2A VH-WQA made a forced landing on a road near Kubin Airport on Moa Island due to fuel starvation.
- On 8 March 2015, an Aero Commander 500 aircraft registered VH-WZV over-ran the runway at Badu Island Airport during an attempted take-off attempt, following an aborted take-off.
