= Kubin Airport =

Airport in Queensland, Australia

Kubin Airport Moa Island Airport
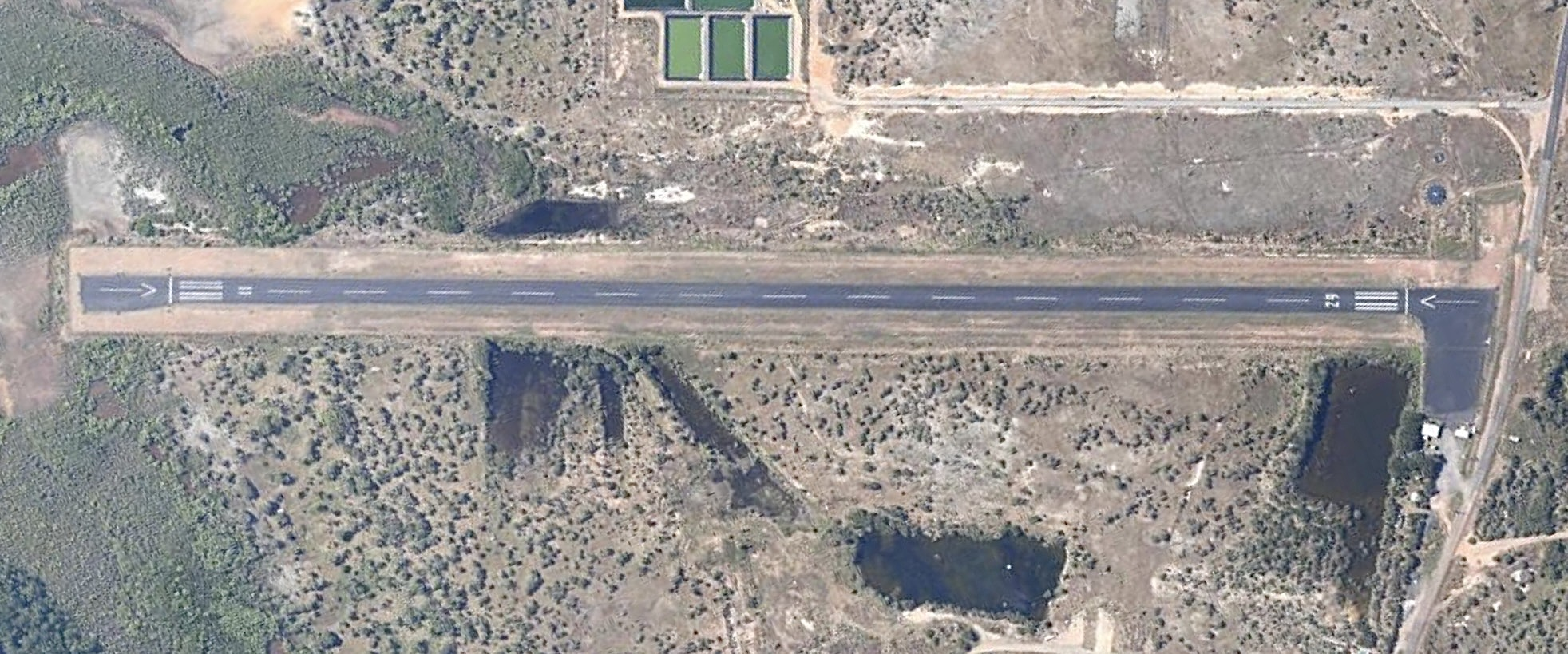
- Aerial view of Kubin Airport taken between 24 July and 30 October 2021.
- IATA: KUG; ICAO: YKUB

Summary
- Airport type: Public
- Operator: Torres Strait Island Regional Council
- Location: Kubin, Moa Island, Queensland, Australia
- Elevation AMSL: 15 ft (4.6 m)
- Coordinates: 10°13′35″S 142°13′10″E

Map
- Location in Queensland

Runways
Direction	Length		Surface
Direction	m	ft	Surface
11/29	1,000	3,281	Unrated/Sealed
- Sources: AIP and World Aero Database

Kubin Airport (IATA: KUG, ICAO: YKUB) is an airfield near Kubin, a village on Moa Island, one of the Torres Strait Islands in Queensland, Australia. It was initially established in 1983 as a fair-weather airport with a 680 metre long unpaved airstrip. In late 1999, the runway was sealed and extended to 1000 metres, allowing air services to operate year-round.

== History ==
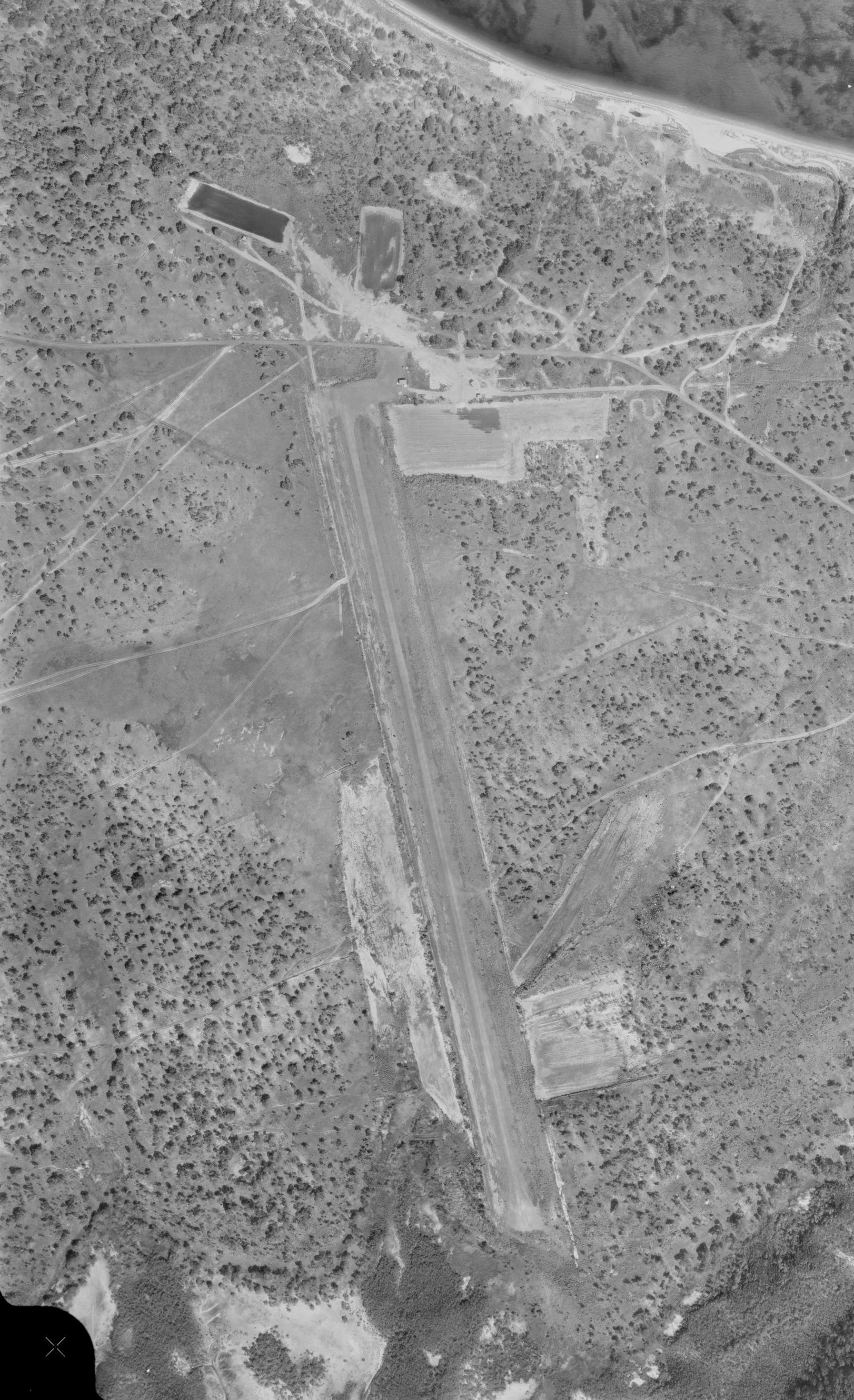
Aerial view of Kubin Airport taken on 1 November 1987.

Construction of an airstrip at Moa Island began in 1983 under a broader trend of improving airport infrastructure in the Torres Strait since the 1970s. During construction, a cultural site with a Bu shell (Syrinx aruanus) on some rocks were moved to make way for the airstrip. On 23 September 1983, the new airstrip opened as Wees Nadia Memorial Airport alongside the Anu Namai-Memorial Park on Moa Island. It was attended by Pat Killoran, Director of the Department of Aboriginal and Islanders Advancement. The opening ceremony day's activities included a dugong and turtle feast and Island dancing extending into the night.

=== Modernisation ===
Upgrading the unpaved runway began during the second half of 1999, extending it to 1000 metres from 680 metres. In September 1999, the sealing of the unpaved runway was completed. It provided all-weather operations and year-round air services to the island.

== Facilities ==
The airport is at an elevation of 15 ft (5 m) above sea level. It has one runway designated 11/29, which measures 1,000 m × 18 m (3,281 ft × 59 ft).

== Airlines and destinations ==
Airlines	Destinations
Hinterland Aviation	Badu Island, Horn Island, Mabuiag Island
Skytrans Airlines	Badu Island, Horn Island, Mabuiag Island

== See also ==
- List of airports in Queensland
