= Tanus =

Tanus may refer to:

- Tanus, Tarn, France
- Tanus (Crete), a town of ancient Crete

== People with the surname ==
- Jonatan Tanus (born 1995), Finnish ice hockey player
- Sari Tanus (born 1964), Finnish doctor and politician

== See also ==
- Tanu (disambiguation)
- Tanos (river), Peloponnese, Greece
- Taunus (disambiguation)
