= Air Satellite =

Airline based in Baie-Comeau, Quebec, Canada

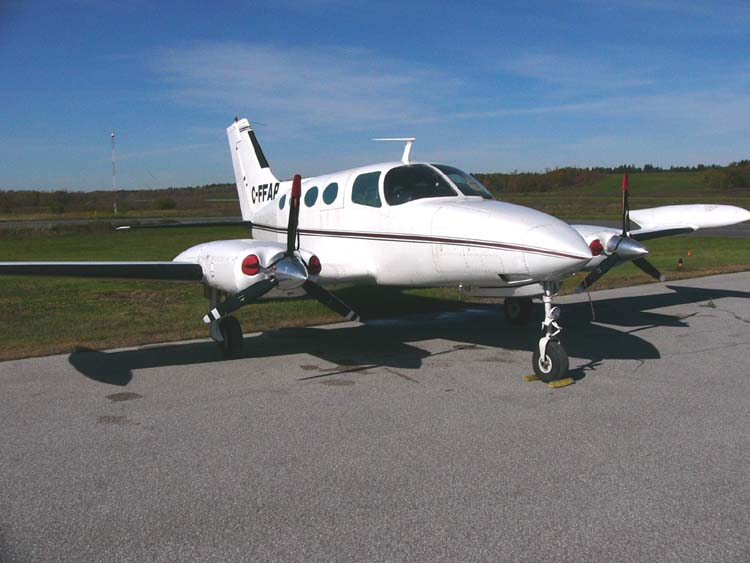
- Air Satellite used the Cessna 402
| IATA | ICAO | Call sign |
|---|---|---|
| 6O | ASJ | SATELLITE |
- Founded: 1968
- Commenced operations: May 1968
- Ceased operations: 2007
- Hubs: Baie-Comeau Airport
- Fleet size: 2
- Headquarters: Baie-Comeau, Quebec, Canada

Air Satellite was an airline based in Baie-Comeau, Quebec, Canada. It operated scheduled, charter passenger and cargo services, as well as supplying aviation fuel, ground services and aircraft maintenance and repair. Its main base was Baie-Comeau Airport, with hubs at Rimouski Airport, Sept-Îles Airport, Havre Saint-Pierre Airport and Quebec Airport.

== History ==
The airline was established in 1968 and started operations in May 1968. It was founded by Jean Fournier and Real Poulin as a flying school. The acquisition of other related companies led to the launch into passenger and cargo transport services. In 1989 Air Satellite acquired Air-Aviation stock of Rimouski.

Air Satellite sustained a fatal accident on December 7, 1998, when its aircraft, a Britten-Norman BN2A Islander, fell into the St. Lawrence River one mile from the Baie-Comeau Airport, killing 7 and injuring 3 more. The crash was one cause for the airline's diminished success, which eventually led to its sale in 2007 to Exact Air.

== Fleet ==
The Air Satellite fleet consisted of the following aircraft in August 2007:

- 2 Raytheon Beech King Air 100
- 3 Cessna 402
- 1 Cessna 310

== See also ==
- List of defunct airlines of Canada
