= Badu Island =

Island in Queensland, Australia

Badu; Badu Island
- Suburb
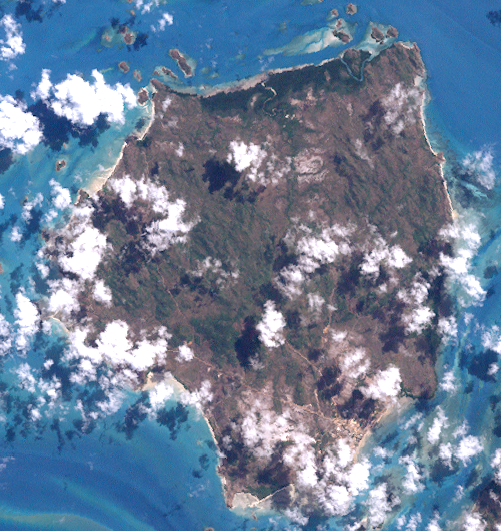
- A satellite image of Badu Island

- Interactive map of Badu; Badu Island
- Coordinates: 10.1202°S 142.1394°E
- Country: Australia
- State: Queensland
- LGA: Torres Strait Island Region

Government
  - State electorate: Cook
  - Federal division: Leichhardt

Area
  - Total: 101.0 km^{2} (39.0 sq mi)

Population
  - Total: 704 (2021 census)
  - Density: 6.970/km^{2} (18.053/sq mi)
- Time zone: UTC+10:00 (AEST)
- Postcode: 4875

Badu or Badu Island (/ˈbɑːduː/; Kala Lagaw Ya: Badhu, pronounced [bad̪u]; also Mulgrave Island), is an island in the Torres Strait 60 kilometres (37 mi) north of Thursday Island, Queensland, Australia. Badu Island is also a locality in the Torres Strait Island Region, and Wakaid is the only town, located on the south-east coast. This island is one of the Torres Strait Islands. The language of Badu is Kala Lagaw Ya.

The Mura Badulgal (Torres Strait Islanders) Corporation administers land on behalf of the Badulgal people. The Badulgal people's ownership of Badu and surrounding islands in the Torres Strait was recognised in a native title determination on 1 February 2014, when the Queensland Government handed over to the Badulgal traditional owners freehold title to 9,836 hectares (24,310 acres) of land. The Mura Badulgal (Torres Strait Islanders) Corporation (an RNTBC) administers land on behalf of the Badulgal people.

In the 2021 census, Badu Island had a population of 704 people with 86.9% identifying as Indigenous Australians.

== Geography ==
The Island is approximately 52 kilometres (32 mi) north of Thursday Island.

The town of Dogai lies on the south-eastern coast facing Moa Island (10.1562°S 142.1711°E). The land use in the town is housing and residential amenities. The land outside the town is mostly undeveloped.

North-east of the town is the Badu Island Airstrip; it has a 500-metre (1,600 ft) runway.

There are a number of named headlands along the coast, commencing at the town and proceeding clockwise:

- Zigini Point (10.1812°S 142.1636°E)
- Point Upai (10.1806°S 142.1628°E)
- Rugged Point (10.1792°S 142.1343°E)
- Red Point (10.1492°S 142.1094°E)
- Coconut Point (10.1305°S 142.0889°E)
- Barabars Point (10.1143°S 142.0866°E)
- Tugu Point (10.0852°S 142.1089°E)
- North West Point (Bomal Point) (10.0700°S 142.1144°E)
- Round Rock Point (Dugu) (10.0601°S 142.1825°E)

== History ==
Kala Lagaw Ya is one of the languages of the Torres Strait. Kalaw Lagaw Ya is the traditional language used on the Western and Central islands of the Torres Strait. The Kalaw Lagaw Ya language region includes the territory within the local government boundaries of the Torres Shire Council.

In 1606, Luís Vaz de Torres sailed to the north of Australia through Torres Strait, navigating it, along New Guinea's southern coast.

Warfare (feuding, headhunting), farming, fishing, canoe building, house building, turtle and dugong hunting and a host of other activities were the main occupations of Badu men until the 1870s. However, headhunting and warfare along some pagan customs ceased with the adoption of Christianity.

Pearlers established bases on the island during the 1870s and by the early 1880s the islanders were becoming dependent on wages earned as lugger crews. At the same time, the first missionaries arrived. At the peak of the shell industry in the late 1950s, the Badu fleet of 13 boats employed a workforce of 200 providing work for many men, even from other islands as well. Once the shell trade declined, many people moved to the mainland for work.

Badu Island State School opened on 29 January 1905. On 1 January 2007, it became the Badu Island campus of Tagai State College.

On 1 February 2014, the Queensland Government handed over to the Badhulgal traditional owners freehold title to 9,836 hectares (24,310 acres) of land on Badu Island, ending a struggle for recognition dating back to 1939. The title deed was handed over by David Kempton, Assistant Minister for Aboriginal and Torres Strait Islander Affairs, to Badu Elder Lily Ahmat at a ceremony on the island. An Indigenous land use agreement was signed on 7 July 2014.

== Demographics ==
In the 2016 census, Badu Island had a population of 813 people with 86.3% identifying as Indigenous Australians.

In the 2021 census, Badu Island had a population of 704 people with 86.9% identifying as Indigenous Australians.

== Education ==
Badu Island Campus (Badhulgaw Ngurpay Lag) is a primary (Early Childhood to Year 6) campus of Tagai State College at 11 Ngurpai Yabu (also known as School Street, 10.1592°S 142.1632°E). The college has its main campus on Thursday Island. There are no secondary schools near Badu. The Tagai State College has only one secondary school campus, which is on Thursday Island and has boarding facilities for students from other islands. The alternatives are distance education or other boarding schools.

== Facilities ==
St Mark's Church was constructed in 1933 and construction was completed in 1935. On 12 January 1936 the church was dedicated to Reverend Stephen Davies, Bishop of Carpentaria. The church was built to accommodate approximately 700 people. The church is still used today.

The Badu Island Indigenous Knowledge Centre (IKC) is located in the Rural Transaction Centre on Nona Street, and is operated by the Torres Strait Island Regional Council. IKCs operate as libraries, meeting places, hubs, and keeping places.

The Badhulgaw Kuthinaw Mudh Art Centre sees local arts display and sell their works, and internationally recognised with the works of artists such as Alick Tipoti and Laurie Nona. Storing significant cultural artefacts, the centre also provides skills development and training.

Other facilities on Badu Island include:

- regional council office
- health centre with permanent doctor
- two grocery stores, with locally owned J&J Supermarket
- post office
- Centrelink agency
- football field
- motel

A number of other locally owned run businesses are in operation at Badu including live seafood exports.

== Notable residents ==
Notable people of Badu Island include:

- Tanu Nona (1902–1980), pearler and politician, lived at Badu
- Ethel May Eliza Zahel (1877–1951), teacher and public servant who lived and worked on Badu.

== See also ==
- Badu Island Airport
- List of Torres Strait Islands
- The Wild White Man of Badu

== Bibliography ==
- Dixon, Robert (2013). "Cannibalising indigenous texts:headhunting and fantasy in Ion L. Idriess's Coral Sea Adventures". In Creed, Barbara; Hoorn, Jeanette (eds.). Body Trade: Captivity, Cannibalism and Colonialism in the Pacific. Routledge. ISBN 978-1-136-71308-8.
- Beckett, Jeremy . (1987). Torres Strait Islanders: custom and colonialism. Cambridge University Press. ISBN 978-0-521-37862-8.
- Moore, David R. (1979). Islanders and Aborigines at Cape York. Australian Institute of Aboriginal Studies. ISBN 978-0-855-75082-4.
- Shnukal (1), Anna (2008). "Traditional Mua" (PDF). Memoirs of the Queensland Museum. 4 (2): 7–33.
