= Horizon Airways =

Charter Airline in Australia

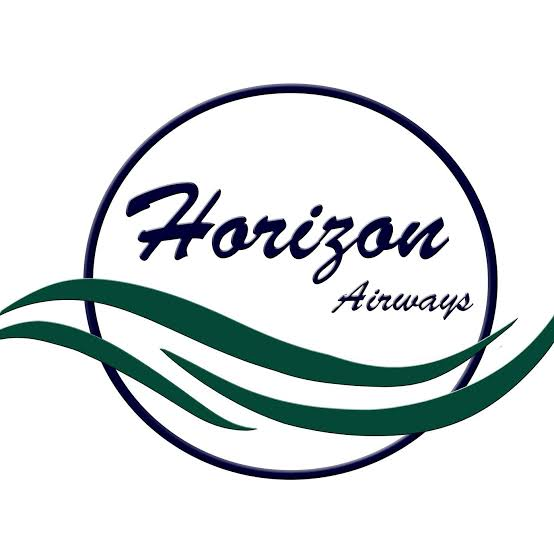
- Founded: 1994; 32 years ago Mackay, Queensland
- AOC #: CASA.AOC.0251
- Fleet size: 12
- Key people: Ed Morrison (CEO/Director) Matthew Munns (HOO/HOFO/HOTAC)
- Founder: Trish Mahlberg
- Website: https://horizonairways.com/

Horizon Airways is an Australian aviation company, providing both flight training and air charter flights in Central, Western and Northern Queensland.

Horizon Airways was founded by Trish Mahlberg in 1994 at Mackay Airport. After selling the business in July 2021 to Ed Morrison, the business has since expanded with additional bases at Cloncurry Airport, Innisfail Airport and Horn Island Airport.

== Company Details ==
Mr. Ed Morrison purchased Horizon Airways from Trish Mahlberg in July 2021, employing Mr. Matthew Munns as Chief Pilot, and Head of Operations. The company successfully transitioned in April 2022 to become a CASR 135 air transport operator, CASR 138 aerial work operator and CASR 141 flight training operator.

In early 2022, Horizon Airways opened a training base in Cloncurry, Queensland, offering training from recreational through to commercial pilot licenses.

In mid 2022, Horizon Airways opened a charter base in Horn Island, Queensland, initially offering charter flights in a single Cessna 206. Horizon Airways have expanded their operations to include three Cessna 206's and one Tecnam P2012 STOL.

== Aircraft fleet ==
Current Horizon Airways fleet
Aircraft	In service	Orders	Notes
Cessna 172	3	-	2x C172M, 1x C172N Mackay and Cloncurry Based
Cessna 172RG	2	-	Mackay Based
Cessna 152	1	-	Mackay Based
Cessna 206	3	-	Horn Island Based
Piper PA-34 Seneca	1	-	Innisfail Based
Piper PA-31 Navajo	3	-	Cairns Based
Tecnam P2012 Traveller	1	1	STOL Variant. Horn Island Based
Total Fleet Size	14	1	

=== Former fleet ===
Horizon Airways has previously operated the following aircraft types:

1. GippsAero GA8 Airvan - December 2023 to October 2024
