= Taunus (disambiguation) =

Taunus can refer to the following:

- Taunus, a mountain range in Germany
- Taunus Corporation, the American holding company for Deutsche Bank
- Ford Taunus, a large family car manufactured in Germany by Ford from 1939 to 1982

== See also ==
- Tanus (disambiguation)
