= Luftverkehr Friesland-Harle =

German regional airline

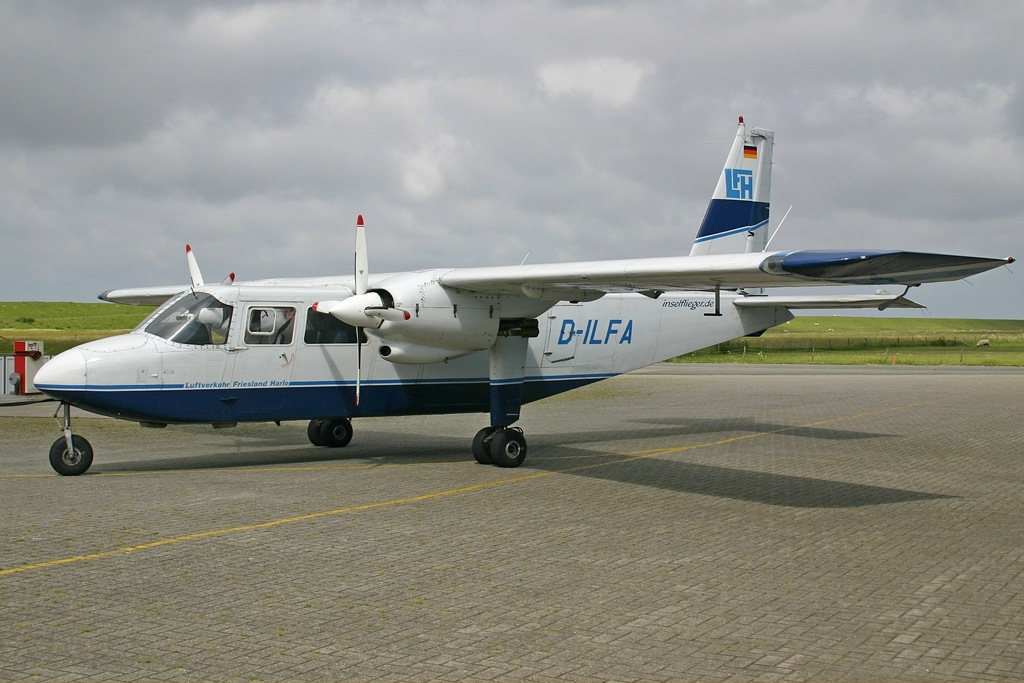
- Britten-Norman Islander
IATA	ICAO	Call sign
-	-	-
- Founded: September 1983
- Commenced operations: October 1983
- Ceased operations: 2014 (merged into FLN Frisia Luftverkehr)
- Fleet size: 8
- Parent company: FLN Frisia Luftverkehr from 2011
- Headquarters: Wangerland, Germany

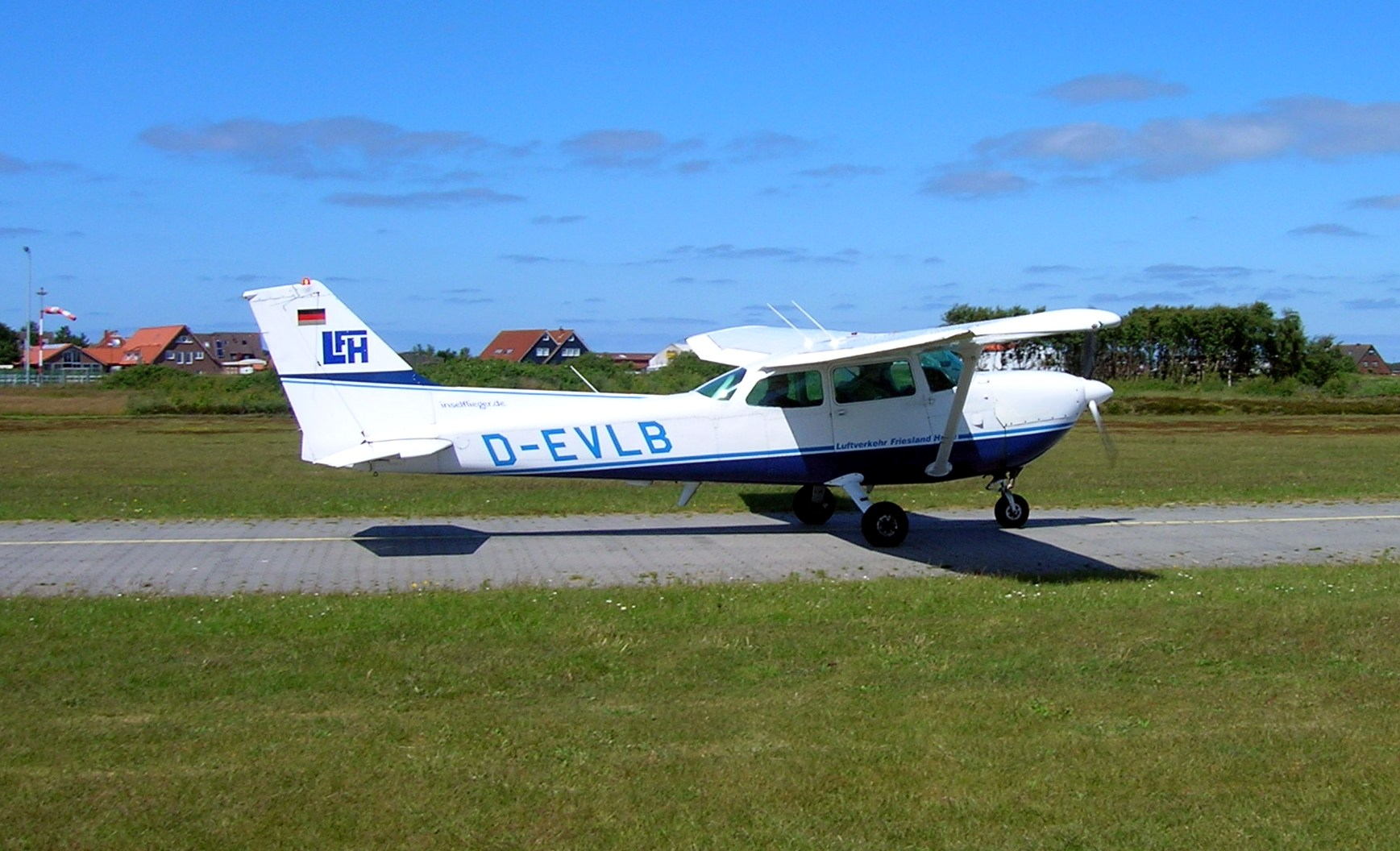
A Cessna 172 in 2009

Luftverkehr Friesland-Harle, commonly abbreviated LFH, was a small airline based in Wangerland, Germany, that was established in 1983 and which operated scheduled and chartered passenger and cargo flights, linking Harle Airfield (de) to the East Frisian Islands. Schedules were started on 1 October 1983, a few days after the foundation. At March 2007 it had 30 employees. In 2011, LFH was acquired by fellow FLN Frisia Luftverkehr, which continued to operate the subsidiary until it was fully absorbed in 2014.

== Destinations ==
As of 2013, LFH operated scheduled services between Harle and Wangerooge, on-demand flights to the other East Frisian Islands of Langeoog, Baltrum, Norderney, Juist and Borkum, as well as to Heligoland. The airline was also occasionally contracted to operate flights in Estonia.

== Fleet ==
As of August 2013, the LFH fleet consisted of the following aircraft types:

Aircraft type	In service
Britten-Norman Islander	5
Cessna 172	3
Total	8

== Incidents and accidents ==
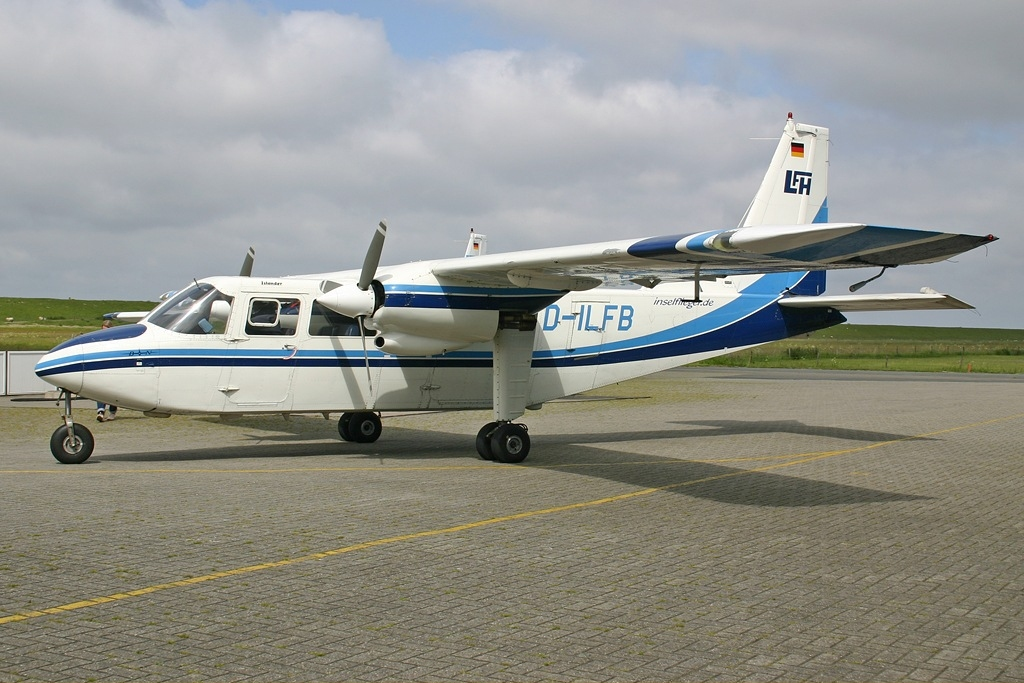
BN-2 Islander D-ILFB which crashed 2007

1. On 3 March 2007 at around 16:40 local time, an LFH Britten-Norman Islander (registered D-ILFB) overshot the runway at Ruhnu Airfield in Estonia during a poor-weather landing following a domestic flight from Pärnu. The aircraft was destroyed when it crashed into trees, but the pilot and the two passengers on board survived the accident.
2. Another one of the company's Islanders, registered D-ILFC, was damaged in a landing incident at Wangerooge on 29 June 2009. The aircraft, with one pilot and five passengers on board, was on a short 5-minute flight from Harle when the pilot had to abort landing twice because he was blinded by the sun. At the second go-around attempt, the aircraft slammed hard into the runway, destroying the left landing gear and substantially damaging the left wing. The pilot managed to get airborne again and performed a successful emergency landing at nearby Jever Air Base. There were no injuries.
