= Air Satellite Flight 501 =

1998 aircraft crash in Quebec, Canada

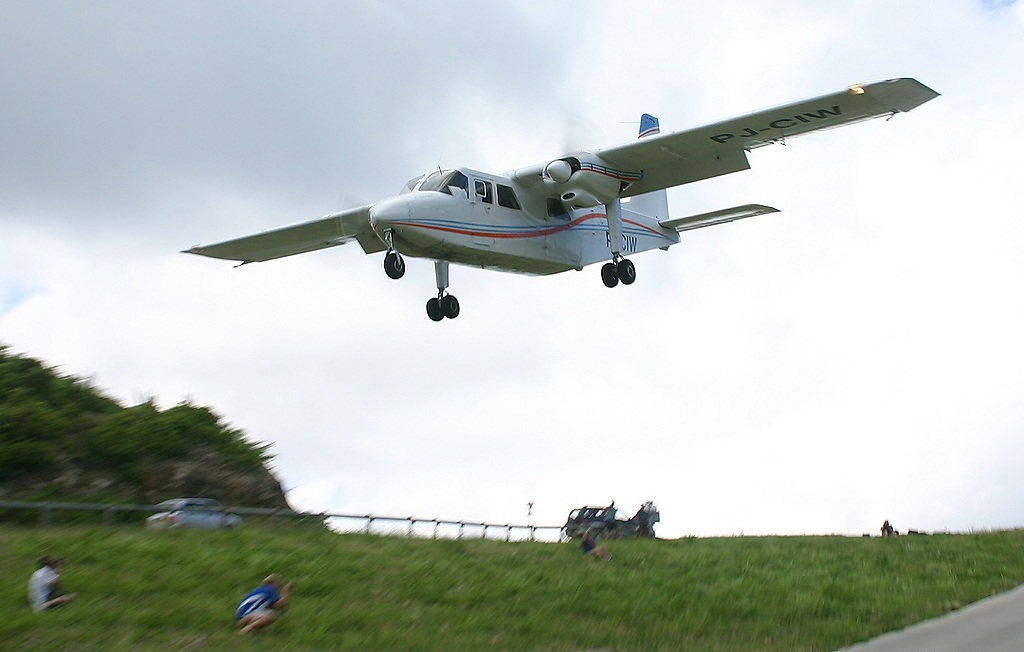
- A BN-2A-26 Islander similar to the aircraft that crashed.

Accident
- Date: 7 December 1998
- Summary: Stall and loss of control
- Site: St. Lawrence River near Pointe-Lebel, Quebec, Canada

Aircraft
- Aircraft type: Britten-Norman BN2A-26 Islander
- Operator: Air Satellite
- Registration: C-FCVK
- Flight origin: Baie-Comeau Airport, Baie-Comeau, Quebec, Canada
- Destination: Rimouski Aerodrome, Rimouski, Quebec Canada
- Occupants: 10
- Passengers: 8
- Crew: 2
- Fatalities: 7
- Survivors: 3

Air Satellite Flight 501 was a scheduled domestic passenger flight from Baie-Comeau to Rimouski in Quebec that was operated by the regional airline Air Satellite. On 7 December 1998, while taking off in freezing conditions, the aircraft pitched up suddenly and became unstable while the flaps were being retracted. Deciding the aircraft could not safely continue the flight, the pilot maneuvered to return to Baie-Comeau. During the turn, the aircraft rolled rapidly to the left and crashed into the St. Lawrence River. Six of the 8 passengers and the co-pilot were killed in the crash or while awaiting rescue, which came 98 minutes after take-off due to faulty equipment and the failure of the crew to transmit a distress call.

== Aircraft ==
The aircraft involved, a Britten-Norman BN2A-26 Islander, serial number 2028 registered as C-FCVK, was manufactured in 1986 and received its Certificate of Airworthiness on 27 October 1988. At the time of the accident the airframe had a total of 9,778 flight hours. It was powered by two Lycoming O-540-E4C5 engines, which were noted as having maintenance irregularities upon inspection of the wreckage. The aircraft logbook noted a significant increase in motor oil consumption on 1 December 1998, six days before the accident.

On the day of the accident, the pilot-in-command arrived at the airport at approximately 04:45 EST to inspect the aircraft and conduct pre-flight operations. The aircraft had been stored inside the Air Satellite hangar since the night before, and the pilot found no irregularities after conducting a walk around inspection of the aircraft. At approximately 09:00 EST (13:00 UTC), the door of the hangar was opened to allow the aircraft to acclimatize to the outside temperature, preventing the buildup of ice on the flight surfaces when falling snow touched the warmer surfaces of the aircraft. It was brought outside of the hangar between 10:00 and 10:15, where the pilot and co-pilot performed runup and aircraft system inspections. After being informed that there would be eight passengers, the pilot-in-command asked Air Satellite's flight monitoring attendant to enter 500 pounds of fuel on the Air Satellite weight and balance sheet. Due to the poor weather conditions and the likelihood that they would need to divert to Mont-Joli, the pilot requested that an additional 300 pounds of fuel be added, bringing the total fuel level to 800 pounds. This brought the total aircraft weight more than 200 pounds above the maximum allowable take-off weight, contributing to reducing the aircraft's performance.

== Flight crew ==
The pilot-in-command, 40-year-old Jean-François Roch, had 1,098 flying hours, including 234 hours on the Britten-Norman BN-2. The co-pilot, 24-year-old Soledade Lauzon, was a 24-year-old flight instructor with 679 flying hours and 68 hours on the Britten-Norman BN-2. Both crew members were certified and qualified for the flight in accordance with existing regulations, and regularly flew the route between Baie-Comeau and Rimouski twice a day, five days a week. The pilot had limited experience in IFR conditions, but his total experience flying in snowy weather was four days-all occurring within the three weeks prior to Flight 501.

== Flight ==
Flight ASJ501 was scheduled to depart Baie-Comeau Airport for Rimouski Aerodrome at 06:15 Eastern Standard Time (11:15 UTC) on 7 December 1998. The scheduled departure was delayed almost five hours due to an area of freezing rain which was causing severe icing conditions in the area. The air temperature was very near the freezing point (−0.2 °C), creating a wet snow with a high water content. Environment Canada reported that more than 1cm of snow fell while the aircraft was outside, and that snow had accumulated on the aircraft's surfaces. While taxiing, the pilot-in-command François Roch concluded that the snow was not adhering to the windshield and therefore the flight surfaces were not contaminated and the aircraft did not need to be de-iced.

Flight 501 received takeoff clearance using Instrument Flight Rules (IFR) from the flight service specialist (FSS) at Mont-Joli Airport at 11:04 EST (16:04 UTC). The aircraft took off at 11:09 EST (16:09 UTC) with eight passengers and two pilots on board. At that time, visibility was approximately 0.5 statute miles with moderate snow showers. Despite not de-icing the aircraft, Roch had started the propeller de-icing unit, the stall warning system, pitot heating, and the windshield heat panel. Shortly after takeoff, the co-pilot, Soledade Lauzon, informed the Mont-Joli FSS that they had taken off from Baie-Comeau. Forty seconds later, Lauzon read back instructions received from the FSS to contact Montreal Area Control Centre (ACC) on 134.65MHz. This was the last transmission received from Flight 501.

Roch reduced engine power to a climb setting and continued on a runway heading at a climb rate of approximately 500 feet per minute and a speed of 100 knots. At 500 feet above sea level (ASL), the aircraft turned right to intercept the Baie-Comeau VOR in accordance with standard departure procedure. After initiating the turn but before entering the cloud layer, Roch retracted the flaps. The flaps should have been retracted before setting the climb setting engine power, according to the take-off checklist. Almost immediately, the nose of the aircraft pitched up suddenly, greatly reducing the aircraft's general stability as the aircraft entered an area of wind shear. The aircraft's speed dropped from 100 knots to 70 knots, indicating a stall. In response, Roch extended the flaps to 25° and lowered the nose of the aircraft. Having determined the aircraft was not safe to continue the flight, he attempted to return to Baie-Comeau and began lining up to land on Runway 28. Shortly after beginning a slightly banked left turn, the left wing tilted toward the St. Lawrence River, and the aircraft pitched downward. Roch attempted to regain control by pulling on the control column and turning the control wheel to right the level of the aircraft. However, Flight 501 was at an insufficient altitude to recover from the stall. The aircraft crashed in the St. Lawrence River at 11:11 EST (16:11 UTC), approximately 1 nm from the end of Runway 10 and 0.5nm from shore.

Four of the passengers were killed instantly when the floor in the middle of the plane buckled upward as the wing collapsed upon impact. At the time of the crash, the water was approximately 1 meter deep with a rising tide. The aircraft had three rows of two seats and a two-seat bench at the rear of the cabin. Roch, Lauzon, and passengers in seats 1A, 1B, 4A and 4B survived the initial impact. Lauzon sustained a serious facial injury and was unconscious after the crash. Roch and passengers from seats 1A and 1B were able to free the co-pilot from her seat and brought her up on top of the wreckage where they awaited assistance. The passengers in 4A and 4B were unable to move and remained seated and secured in the two-seat bench. As the tide rose, the water level came up to their waists. Due to their injuries, the survivors on the top of the cabin were unable to help those passengers out of the wreckage. While Roch and the passenger from seat 1A held onto Lauzon, the passenger from seat 1B laid down on top of the cabin roof and held the head of the passenger in seat 4B out of the water until the cabin was submerged between 12:00 and 12:15. The passenger in seat 4A never regained consciousness after the crash and also drowned. Shortly after the water covered the wreckage, the survivors, all suffering from hypothermia after spending nearly an hour and a half in the freezing water, could no longer hold onto the unconscious Lauzon, and she was carried away by the current at 12:30.

== Search and rescue operations ==
The Emergency Locator Transmitter (ELT) on board the aircraft was not installed in accordance with the manufacturer's specifications. Instead, it was mounted on the floor of the aircraft, increasing the risk of damage. In addition, after deciding to return to Baie-Comeau, the pilot-in-command failed to transmit an emergency message. When the plane hit the water, the ELT was ejected from its mounting plate and the antenna connection contacted the water. As a result, the ELT transmitted a reduced signal that prevented the search and rescue satellite-aided tracking (SARSAT) system from validating the system. The ELT did broadcast between 11:11 and 11:15; however, the SARSAT database calculated the signal's geographic position as 111nm from the accident site. Signals broadcast by the ELT on 121.5MHz and 243MHz frequencies were restricted to line-of-sight limitations, and the remote communications outlet (RCO) at the Baie-Comeau tower was not tuned to the emergency frequency. As a result, a distress call was not received, heard, or reported during the search, hampering and significantly delaying rescue operations.

At 11:12, the Montreal Area Control Centre (ACC), the Mont-Joli Flight Service Station (FSS), and some aircraft in flight attempted to contact Flight 501. The Mont-Joli FSS informed the Baie-Comeau airport that Air Traffic services (ATS) had lost contact with Flight 501 shortly after takeoff at 11:27. Four minutes later, an airport maintenance attendant at Baie-Comeau went to the apron with a direction finder to see if he could receive an ELT signal. Meanwhile, a second airport maintenance attendant searched the runway. The attendants at the airport were unable to locate the aircraft, and notified the Pointe-Lebel fire department and various police departments. At 11:50, the Baie-Comeau airport manager attempted to locate the aircraft from the control tower. Unable to find the aircraft, the airport personnel informed the Rescue Coordination Centre (RCC) in Halifax, Nova Scotia, which dispatched a Hercules from Canadian Forces Base (CFB) in Trenton, Ontario, to search for Flight 501. The Canadian Coast Guard (CCG) was notified of the accident at 11:54. They dispatched the CCGS George R. Pearkes, then berthed at Baie-Comeau harbor, to search for the downed aircraft at 11:57. At 11:59, the Mont-Joli FSS declared the aircraft was missing and moved into a Code Yellow alerting phase.

A young girl, Anne-Charlie Bouffard, was watching the river and spotted the wreckage of Flight 501 around 12:00. Her mother reported the sighting to the Sûreté du Québec (SQ), the provincial police service of Quebec. SQ requested assistance from a commercial operator, Héli-Manicouagan, to dispatch a Bell 206 helicopter to the site of the accident. At 12:14, the Halifax RCC dispatched a Bell CH-146 Griffon helicopter from CFB Bagotville to the scene to rescue the victims. The Bell 206 departed Baie-Comeau at 12:27, arriving on the scene at 12:36. By now, the survivors had been clinging to the wreckage of Flight 501 in freezing temperatures for 87 minutes. They were suffering from hypothermia and serious injuries sustained in the crash. The Héli-Manicouagan Bell 206 was not equipped with floats or a winch, and had to hover over the wreckage to recover the survivors. Despite this, the aircraft maintenance engineer was able to pull one of the survivors of Flight 501 on board the helicopter. The survivor was then brought to emergency personnel on shore. Two minutes later, the Bell 206 returned to the scene and rescued the two other survivors at 12:47 - 98 minutes after the crash.

Due to difficult access to the water, the distance to be covered in rough water, and the adverse environmental conditions, the first boat arrived at the scene of the accident at 13:11 EST (18:11 UTC), nearly 21 minutes after the survivors were evacuated by helicopter. Search operations continued throughout the night, while divers collected the bodies of the victims except co-pilot Lauzon, whose body was never recovered.

== Investigation and aftermath ==
After the accident, the minister of public security Serge Ménard ordered a public inquiry to be held at the Baie-Comeau courthouse to shed light on the timing of the emergency response. During the hearings, the director of Baie-Comeau airport, Serge Parent, argued that the emergency operations plan did not allow for a helicopter to be dispatched to search for a missing aircraft until it was confirmed that it had crashed. Without an ELT signal, it was impossible to confirm that Flight 501 had indeed crashed.

The Transportation Safety Board of Canada (TSB) identified several maintenance deficiencies on C-FCVK. These deficiencies included a defective lift sensor on the stall warning system, an incorrect shoulder harness installation, the condition of the engines and alternators, and the ELT transmitter being mounted outside of manufacturer specifications. The TSB determined that C-FCVK's certificate of airworthiness did not meet regulatory requirements.

The TSB also concluded that the pilots had little experience in adverse weather conditions and therefore had difficulty making effective decisions before and during the flight. The pilot had only flown in wintery conditions four times, and these flights were all conducted within three weeks prior to the crash. This inexperience likely contributed to the pilot's decision not to de-ice the aircraft prior to takeoff. With the defective stall warning system, the crew was not alerted to the impending stall. The crew's failure to transmit an emergency message before returning to Baie-Comeau, as well as the failure of the ELT, significantly delayed search and rescue operations. Additionally, a lack of lifejackets on board the aircraft likely contributed to greater loss of life. The TSB criticized Air Satellite's standard operating procedures on aircraft maintenance, supervision of operations, and crew training.

Following the accident, the Baie-Comeau Airport included Héli-Manicouagan as a front-line operator in its emergency operations plan, and modified airport procedures so helicopters could be dispatched before a missing airplane had been confirmed as down.
