= Tanu Nona =

Australian pearler and politician (1902–1980)

Tanu Nona OBE (c. 1902 — 10 December 1980) was an Australian pearler and politician. Nona, of mixed Samoan and Torres Strait Islander ancestry, operating pearling boats along the coast of Queensland from the 1920s until his death. He was also a local councillor on the Badu Island council and a leading figure in local government among the western islands group.
