= Horn Island Airport =

Airport in Queensland, Australia

- IATA: HID; ICAO: YHID

Summary
- Airport type: Public
- Operator: Torres Shire Council
- Location: Horn Island, Queensland
- Hub for: Torres Strait Air Cape Air Transport Horizon Airways
- Elevation AMSL: 43 ft (13 m)
- Coordinates: 10.5856°S 142.2927°E

Maps
- Location within Queensland Location within Australia Location within Southeast Asia
- Interactive map of Horn Island Airport

Runways
Direction	Length		Surface
Direction	m	ft	Surface
08/26	1,389	4,557	Asphalt
14/32	1,235	4,052	Asphalt
- Sources: Australian AIP and aerodrome chart

Horn Island Airport (IATA: HID, ICAO: YHID) is an airport on Horn Island in the Torres Strait, Queensland, Australia. It is owned and operated by the Torres Shire Council and is also known as Ngurupai Airport.

Domestic fixed wing charter flights and scheduled flights are carried out by SkyTrans, Hinterland Aviation, Cape Air Transport, Horizon Airways, and Torres Strait Air. The only International services are carried out by Torres Strait Air, with charter flights to Papua New Guinea.

== History ==
Prior to 1939, Thursday Island (to the north-west of Horn Island) had a small airstrip on the north side of the island. It was 450 metres (1,480 ft) long and 15 metres (49 ft). As it was not possible to extend it, in 1939 it was decided that for both civilian and military purposes, a larger airstrip should be built on Horn Island.

=== World War II ===
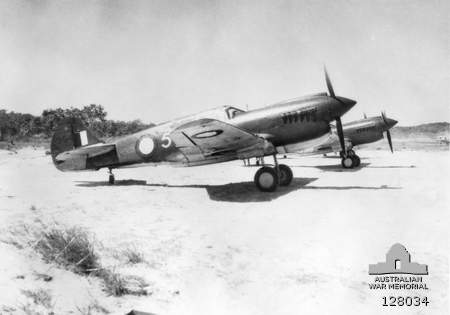
84 Squadron RAAF Kittyhawks on Horn Island, 1940

The Civil Constructional Corps and the Department of Main Roads began construction of an advanced operational airbase on the island during World War II, commencing in 1940. RAAF Base Horn Island was completed in 1941 and was used as a staging base for Allied aircraft moving between Australia and New Guinea. The airfield consisted of two intersecting runways, with revetments for aircraft parking.

==== Japanese bombing raids against Horn Island Aerodrome ====
After Darwin, Horn Island was the second-most bombed area of Australia by the Japanese in World War II.

- 14 March 1942
- 18 March 1942
- 30 April 1942
- 11 May 1942
- 6 July 1942
- 30 July 1942
- 1 August 1942
- 17 June 1943

==== Units based at Horn Island Aerodrome ====
The units were:

- 7th Fighter Squadron of 49th Fighter Group, March 1942 – 18 April 1942 (Curtiss P-40s)
- No. 6 Squadron RAAF
- No. 7 Squadron RAAF
- No. 24 Squadron RAAF
- No. 32 Squadron RAAF
- No. 75 Squadron RAAF
- No. 84 Squadron RAAF
- No. 28 Operational Base Unit RAAF

==== Memorial ====
The Horn Island Veterans Memorial in front of the airport commemorates the American and Australian servicemen who fought and died in the defence of Horn Island and the Torres Strait during World War II. It was designed by Vanessa Seekee OAM and Gordon Cameron OAM from local materials.

== See also ==
- List of airports in Queensland
