= Tanu Forest Park =

Forest park in the Gambia

- IUCN category IV (habitat/species management area)
- Location: Gambia
- Area: 2,667 ha (6,590 acres)

Tanu Forest Park is a forest park in the Gambia. It covers 3,000 hectares.
