= Mabuiag Island Airport =

Airport in Queensland, Australia

- IATA: UBB; ICAO: YMAA

Summary
- Airport type: Private
- Operator: Torres Strait Island Regional Council
- Elevation AMSL: 30 ft (9.1 m)
- Coordinates: 09°56′59.9″S 142°11′42″E

Map
- Location in Queensland

Runways
Direction	Length		Surface
Direction	m	ft	Surface
15/33	460	1,509
- Sources: Australian AIP and aerodrome chart

Mabuiag Island Airport (IATA: UBB, ICAO: YMAA) is an airport on Mabuiag Island, Queensland, Australia. It has one of the shortest commercially operated runways in Australia. The airport was built in 1982 during a push to expand communications and healthcare services through airports to the Torres Strait. In 2000, the runway was sealed to accommodate all-weather operations, after being plagued by a poor runway surface for years.

== History ==
In July 1982, investigations and surveys were underway for an airstrip on Mabuiag Island to improve transport and communications facilities.

=== Modernisation ===
Over the years, each monsoon season would create a muddy, slippery airstrip. Additionally, a sand filled drum and raised runway threshold obstructed approach, contributing to two accidents when a sudden downdraught occurred. In 2000, the State Government contributed $135,000 and the Strait Regional Authority provided $300,000 for sealing the 460 metre long airstrip. The project also included the construction of perimeter fencing and a storage shed. In late November 2000, the new additions were opened by State Member for Cook, Steve Bredhauer. The new runway provided year-round services for the island, supporting all-weather operations.

Under Aviation Transport Security Act 2004, Mabuiag Island Airport was recategorised as a Category 6 security controlled airport on 20 December 2011. In 2009-10, the runway was improved under a broader $9 million package involving other islands. In 2025, Skytrans ended their Cessna C208B operations at the airport.

== Facilities ==
Mabuiag Island Airport operates a single 460 metre long runway, which is considered to be one of Australia's shortest in commercial use. It sits on an elevation of nine metres, positioned on the northwestern side of the island. It is between two hills, however no obstacle lighting is provided for pilots at night.

== Accidents & incidents ==
- On 2 April 1987, a Britten-Norman BN-2A-21 Islander's (registered VH-SBH) right main gear struck a sand filled drum during descent on approach to the airport. Consequently, the right wing buckled and the right engine mount was fractured from impact. The aircraft then experienced a downdraught, resulting in touchdown occurring before the threshold. The pilot was uninjured.

== See also ==
- List of airports in Queensland
