= Tanus (Crete) =

Coordinates: 35°26′51″N 24°12′02″E

Tanus or Tanos (Ancient Greek: Τάνος) was a town of ancient Crete. Tanus minted coins in antiquity, some of which have survived, with the epigraph ΤΑΝΙΩΝ.

The site of Tanus is tentatively located near modern Almyrida/Castel Apicorno.
