= CCGS Tanu =

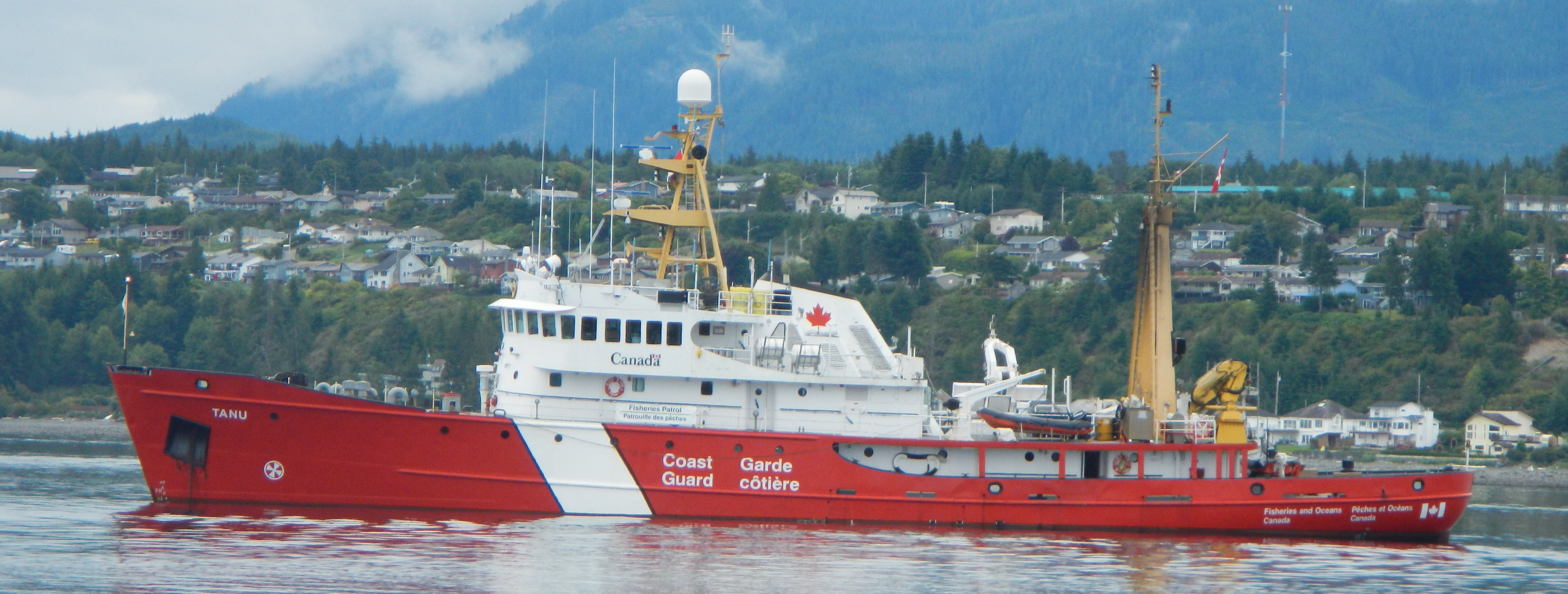
- CCGS Tanu in 2019

History

Canada
- Name: Tanu
- Operator: Canadian Coast Guard
- Builder: Yarrows Ltd., Esquimalt
- Yard number: 324
- Launched: 1968
- Completed: September 1968
- Commissioned: 1968
- Home port: CCG Base Patricia Bay
- Identification: IMO number: 6817754
- Status: Ship in active service

General characteristics
- Type: Fisheries patrol vessel
- Tonnage: 753 GT; 203 NT
- Displacement: 925 long tons (940 t) full load
- Length: 52.1 m (170 ft 11 in)
- Beam: 9.9 m (32 ft 6 in)
- Draught: 3.5 m (11 ft 6 in)
- Installed power: 2 × Fairbanks Morse - 38D8 geared diesels; 1,968 kW (2,639 hp)
- Propulsion: 1 × controllable-pitch propeller
- Speed: 13.5 knots (25.0 km/h)
- Range: 5,000 nmi (9,300 km) at 11 knots (20 km/h)
- Endurance: 22 days
- Complement: 15

CCGS Tanu (Note: CCGS stands for Canadian Coast Guard Ship) is a fisheries patrol vessel in service with the Canadian Coast Guard. The ship was constructed in 1968 by Yarrows at their yard in Esquimalt, British Columbia and entered service the same year. Home ported at Patricia Bay, British Columbia, the ship is primarily used to carry out fisheries patrols and search and rescue missions along Canada's Pacific coast.

== Description ==
Tanu was the third of three vessels designed for fisheries patrol use on Canada's Pacific coast. Tanu had two near-sister ships, CCGS Cape Freels and CCGS Chebucto all designed for fisheries patrols but differed slightly in layout. Tanu has a full load displacement of 925 long tons (940 t), a gross tonnage (GT) of 753 and net tonnage (NT) of 203. (Note: Saunders has the gross register tonnage as 746 tons, while Maginley & Collin have it as 754 tons.) Tanu is 52.1 metres (170 ft 11 in) long with a beam of 9.9 metres (32 ft 6 in) and a draught of 3.5 metres (11 ft 6 in). (Note: The Miramar Ship Index states the vessel's measurements at construction as 54.7 metres (179 ft 6 in) long overall and 50.2 metres (164 ft 8 in) between perpendiculars with a beam of 10.0 metres (32 ft 10 in).)

The ship is powered by two Fairbanks Morse-38D8 geared diesel engines driving one controllable pitch propeller and bow and stern thrusters.. The machinery is rated at 1,968 kilowatts (2,639 hp) and gives the vessel a maximum speed of 13.5 knots (25.0 km/h; 15.5 mph). Tanu has capacity for 236.4 m^{3} (52,000 imp gal) of diesel fuel which gives the ship a range of 5,000 nautical miles (9,300 km; 5,800 mi) at 11 knots (20 km/h; 13 mph) and an endurance of 22 days. The vessel is also equipped with three Caterpillar C9 generators and one Perkins 2430 emergency generator. Tanu has a complement of 15 composed of 6 officers and 9 crew, with berths for an additional 16. The vessel can be equipped with two 12.7 mm machine guns.

== Service history ==
Tanu was constructed by Yarrows with the yard number 324 at their yard in Esquimalt, British Columbia and launched in 1968. The ship was completed in September 1968 and entered service that same year. The vessel is registered in Ottawa, Ontario and is homeported at the Canadian Coast Guard base in Patricia Bay, British Columbia. The vessel is primarily tasked with performing fisheries patrols on the Canadian Pacific coast.

In October 2010, Tanu underwent a major refit performed by Allied Shipbuilders of North Vancouver, British Columbia that upgraded the two main engines to decrease emissions, installed three new generators to modernize the electrical generating system, along with new sewage treatment plant, navigation and communication equipment, galley and hospital. The vessel returned to active service in March 2011.

In April 2018, Tanu was among three Canadian Coast Guard vessels that responded to the distress call of the fishing vessel Western Commander in the Hecate Strait. Three of the crew were rescued, with a fourth dying of a heart attack during the event. The 75-year old fishing vessel which had been listing to starboard upon the Coast Guard's arrival, later sank. In July 2018, Tanu was among the Canadian Coast Guard vessels tasked with performing the largest survey of marine mammal populations in British Columbia waters. Tanu was assigned to survey Hecate Strait, Johnstone Strait, the Strait of Georgia and into Juan de Fuca Strait.

== Sources ==
- "CCG Fleet: Vessel Details - CCGS Tanu". Canadian Coast Guard. Archived from the original on 24 November 2018.
- Maginley, Charles D. & Collin, Bernard (2001). The Ships of Canada's Marine Services. St. Catharines, Ontario: Vanwell Publishing Limited. ISBN 1-55125-070-5.
- "Tanu (6817754)". Miramar Ship Index.
- Saunders, Stephen, ed. (2009). Jane's Fighting Ships 2009–2010 (112 ed.). Alexandria, Virginia: Jane's Information Group Inc. ISBN 978-0-7106-2888-6.
