= Badu Island Airport =

Airport in Queensland, Australia

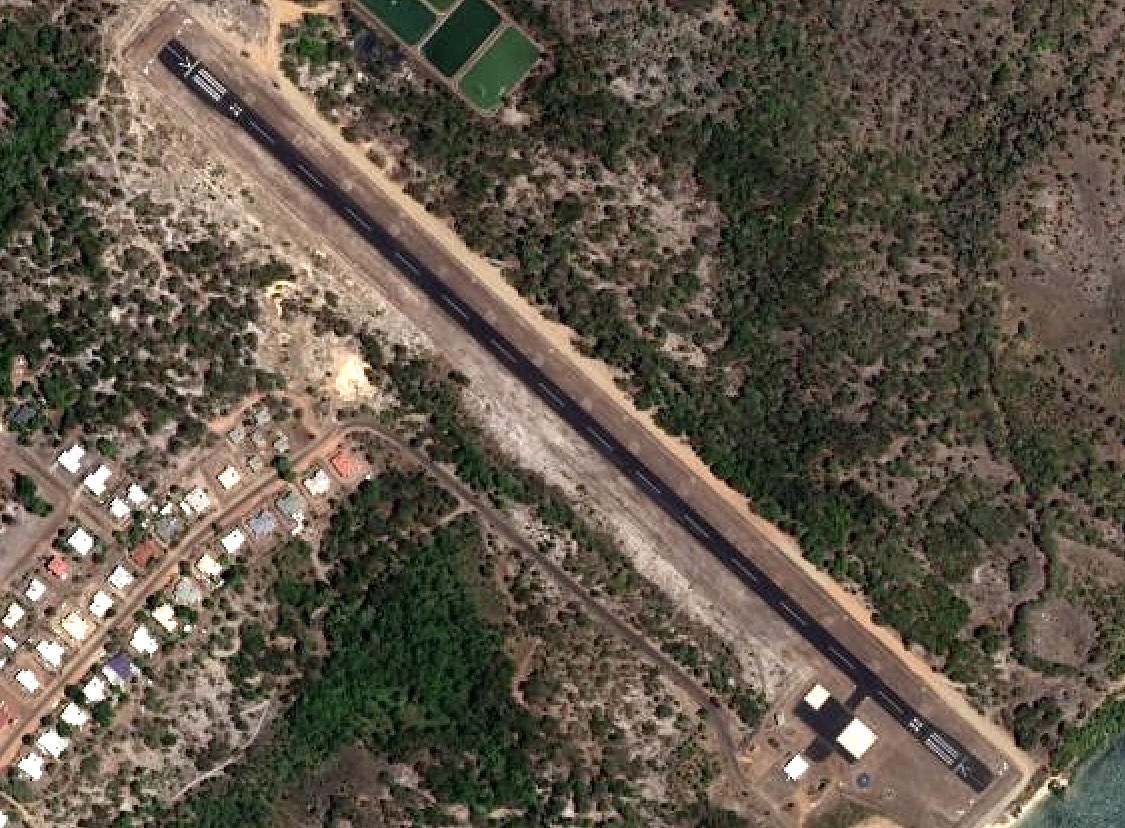
- Aerial view of Badu Island Airport taken on 1 December 2023.
- IATA: BDD; ICAO: YBAU

Summary
- Airport type: Private
- Operator: Torres Strait Island Regional Council
- Location: Badu Island, Queensland, Australia
- Elevation AMSL: 45 ft (14 m)
- Coordinates: 10°09′00″S 142°10′30″E

Map
- Location in Queensland

Runways
Direction	Length		Surface
Direction	m	ft	Surface
12/30	820	2,690	Sealed
- Sources: AIP

Badu Island Airport (IATA: BDD, ICAO: YBAU) is an airport on Badu Island, Queensland, Australia. It was established in 1971, providing fair-weather operations for the Badu Island community. In 2001-2, the runway was paved to provide year-round operations.

== History ==
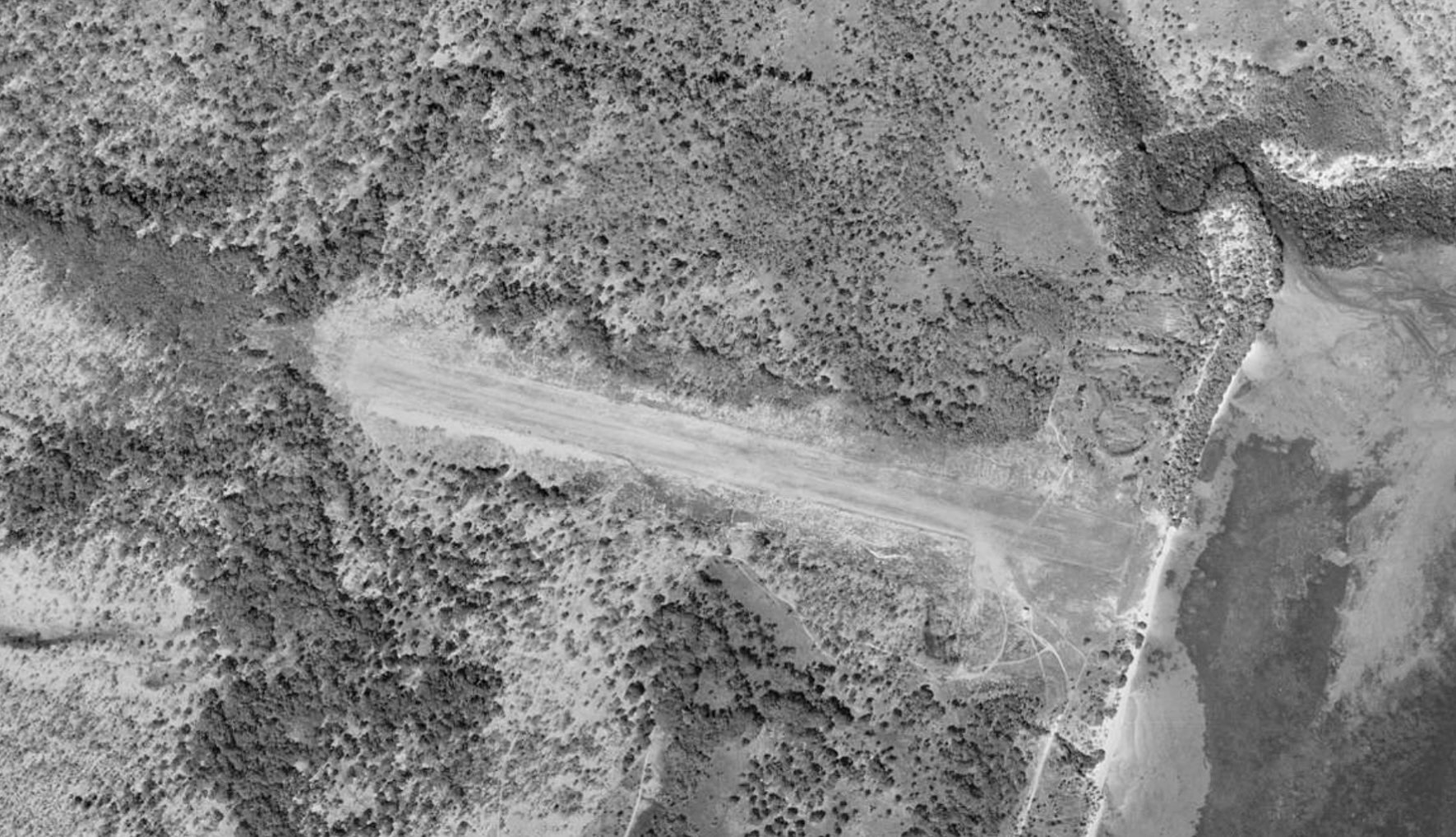
Aerial photo of Badu Island Airstrip taken on 22 October 1987.

In October 1965, a request was made for the Queensland Government to improve aerial connectivity to the Torres Strait, which could support healthcare support for those living at Badu Island and many others. As a result, the State Government began the construction of multiple airstrips in the Torres Strait area. An airstrip at Badu Island was completed in early 1971, becoming the first project of the scheme. Barney Chapman served as the officer-in-charge of the airstrip's construction. In December 1978, a tractor valued at $9,000 was acquired for general duties at the airstrip.

=== Modernisation ===
On 22 October 2001, construction of a sealed apron and 850 metre runway commenced, costing $750,000. Additionally, a two kilometre access road to the airstrip was also sealed. After five months, on 15 March 2002, Badu Island Airport was opened by the then Transport and Main Roads Minister Steve Bredhauer. Upgrading the Boigu Island Airport soon followed. After it was opened, Badu Island was enabled with year-round air operations.

In 2010-11, the runway was re-sealed with bitumen at a cost of $400,000. Under Round 7 of the Remote Airstrip Upgrade Program, Badu Island Airport received the installation of perimeter fencing, under a broader package of $665,270. The upgrade resulted in the replacement of older fences in 2020. The potential installation for night lighting, passenger facilities, additional storage and maintenance facilities, and a car park have been included in the 2022 Badu Island Master Plan.

== Facilities ==
Badu Island Airport is equipped with a single runway; 12/30 measuring 850 metres long. It is equipped with Pilot Activated Lighting and supported by a paved apron on the southern end.

== Accident & incidents ==
- On 2 November 1994, a Cessna 310R's (registered VH-JOF) landing gear struck the ground or an object while overshooting the runway. The pilot noticed that the runway appeared uneven and unserviceable for landing, and diverted to Horn Island afterwards. At the time, the operator involved in the incident was unaware that the airstrip was closed for maintenance.

== See also ==
- List of airports in Queensland
