= Britten-Norman BN-2 Islander =

STOL utility transport aircraft series, 1965

BN-2 Islander
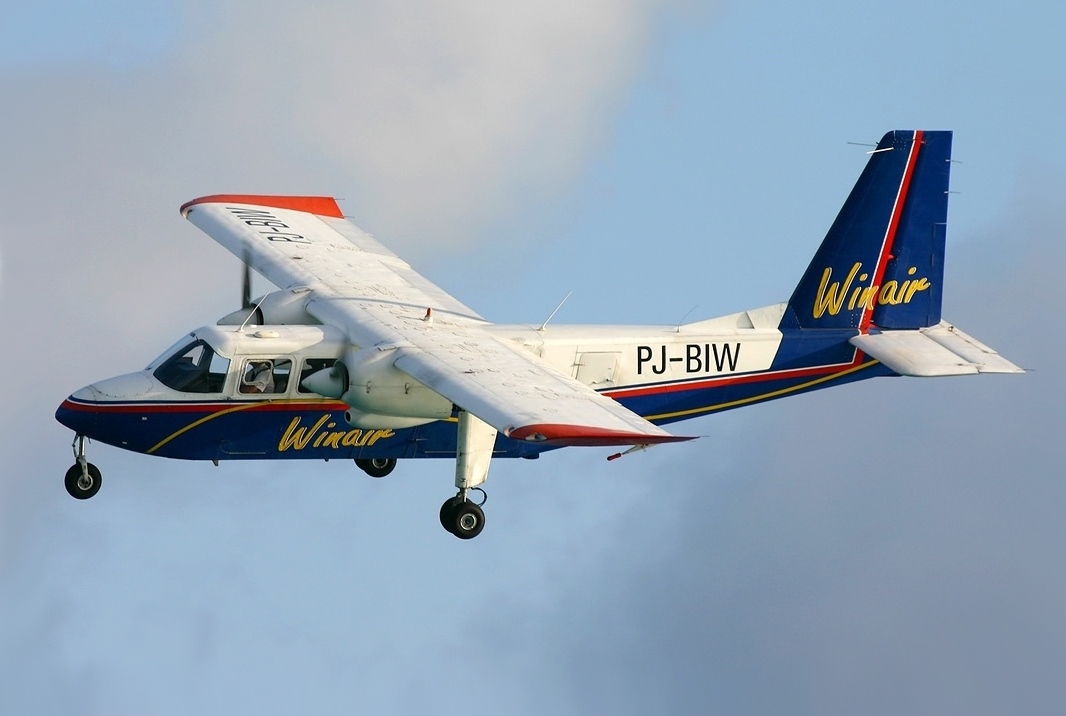
- A Winair Britten-Norman BN-2 Islander

General information
- Type: Utility aircraft/airliner
- National origin: United Kingdom
- Manufacturer: Britten-Norman
- Designer: John Britten, Desmond Norman
- Status: In active service
- Primary users: Vieques Air Link FLN Frisia Luftverkehr; Air Flamenco; Cape Air
- Number built: 1,280

History
- Manufactured: 1965–present
- First flight: 13 June 1965
- Developed into: Britten-Norman Defender; Britten-Norman Trislander

The Britten-Norman BN-2 Islander is a British light piston utility aircraft and regional airliner designed and originally manufactured by Britten-Norman of the United Kingdom. Still in production, the Islander is one of the best-selling commercial aircraft types produced in Europe. Although designed in the 1960s, over 750 are still in service with commercial operators around the world. The aircraft is a light transport with over 30 military aviation operators around the world.

Initial aircraft were manufactured at Britten-Norman's factory in Bembridge, Isle of Wight, UK. After Fairey Aviation acquired the Britten-Norman company, its Islanders and Trislander aircraft were built in Romania, then shipped to Avions Fairey in Belgium for finishing before being flown to the UK for flight certification. Being certified in 1967, the Islander is still in production.

In September 2023, it was announced that production of the Islander has returned to the UK, after fifty-five years of manufacturing abroad.

== Development ==
=== Origins ===
In 1953, Britten-Norman was formed for the purpose of converting and operating agricultural aircraft, amongst other vehicles such as the Cushioncraft hovercraft. In 1963, the firm initiated development work upon what would become the Islander, having sensed a demand for a simple and inexpensive twin-piston engine aircraft. The founders, John Britten and Desmond Norman, had observed the rapid growth of the commuter airline sector, and concluded that capacity was of a higher value to these operators than either range or cruising speed, thus the Islander emphasized payload over either of these attributes.

Through the use of low wing- and span-loading to generate greater effectiveness than conventional counterparts, the Islander could lift considerably heavier payloads than the typical aircraft in its power, weight or cost classes. To reduce manufacturing costs, both the wings and tail surfaces maintain a constant chord and thickness, while the ribs within the aircraft's wing are all identical; both rivets and external fishplate joints are used for the same purpose. The type was originally intended to use a fabric-and-steel design. A light alloy monocoque approach was adopted instead. The structure is designed to give rise to and experience low levels of stress, and has an infinite fatigue life without testing.

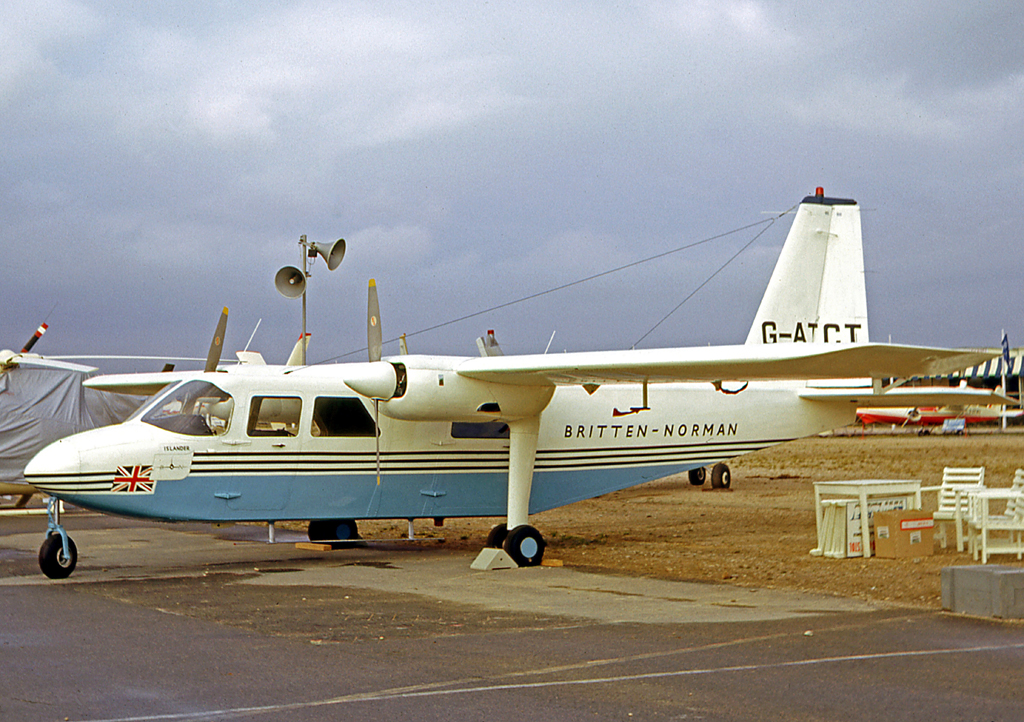
The prototype BN-2 Islander displayed at the 1965 Paris Air Show six days after its maiden flight

On 13 June 1965, the first prototype BN-2 Islander conducted its maiden flight, powered by a pair of Rolls-Royce/Continental IO-360B piston engines; only four days later, the prototype appeared at the Paris Air Show. The IO-360B engines were later replaced by more powerful Lycoming O-540-E engines, which were located further outboard on the wings, for superior single-engine climb performance. On 20 August 1966, a second BN-2 prototype performed its first flight. These prototype aircraft, while resembling subsequent production models for the most part, were outfitted with different, less powerful engines. On 24 April 1967, the first production Islander performed its first flight; UK type certification was received in August 1967, US authorities also certified the type in December 1967.

Initial production of the Islander started at the Britten-Norman factory at Bembridge on the Isle of Wight; however, within a few years the company found that it could not produce the aircraft at a sufficient rate to keep up with the customer demand. To expand production, a contract was placed with Intreprinderea de Reparatii Material Aeronautic (IRMA) of Romania, initially to assemble kit-form aircraft, which were then sent to the UK for completion. In August 1969, the first Romanian-assembled Islander performed its first flight. IRMA proved successful at economically producing the aircraft, producing roughly 30-40 aircraft per year at times, and eventually became the primary manufacturing site for the Islander. In 1977, IRMA received a contract for the production of a further 100 Islanders; from that point on, the firm produced all subsequent Islander aircraft. More than 500 of the type were manufactured in Romania.

In 1970, a military version of the Islander, marketed as the Defender, conducted its first flight. Modifications included the addition of underwing hardpoints for armaments/equipment, and the main cabin area being fitted out for light troop transport and support aircraft duties. The Defender capitalised on the aircraft's rugged structure, making it suitable for long-term operations in developing countries. Purchases by police and military customers have typically been for use in surveillance and counter-terrorism operations. The Maritime Defender is another military version of the Islander, intended for search and rescue, coastal patrol and fishery protection.

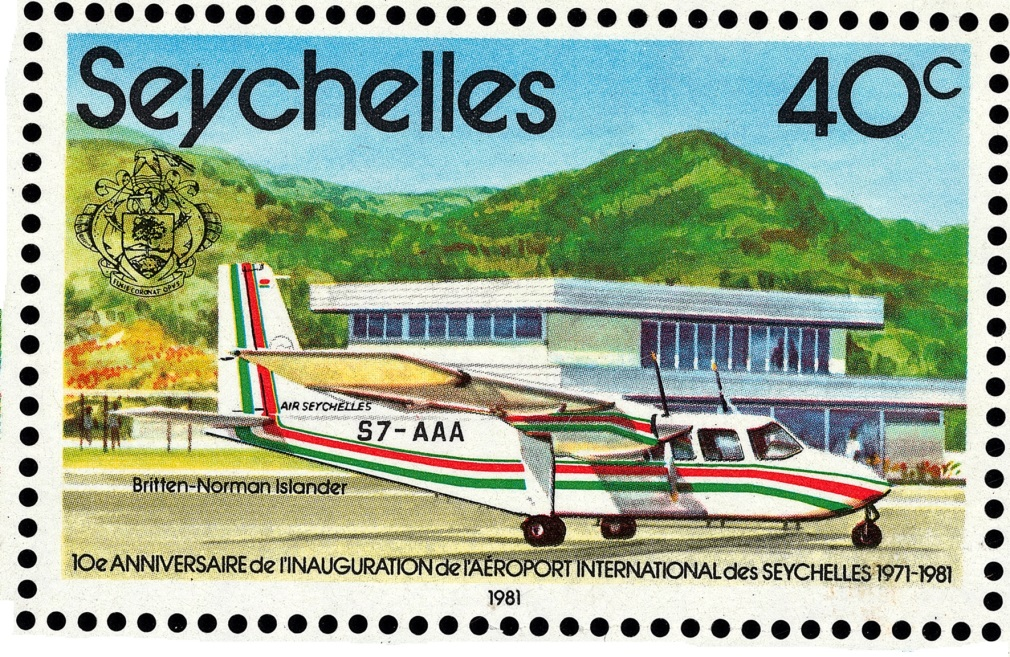
A Seychellois Stamp with an illustration of a Britten-Norman Islander, 1981

=== Further development ===
Despite the relative success of the Islander, Britten-Norman experienced wider financial difficulties during the late 1960s, ultimately resulting in the company entering receivership in October 1971. In August 1972, Britten-Norman was purchased by the Fairey Aviation Group, forming the Fairey Britten-Norman company; shortly thereafter, the majority of manufacturing activity for both the Islander and Trislander was transferred to its Avions Fairey factory in Gosselies, Belgium. Completed aircraft were flown to Bembridge for final customer preparation prior to delivery.

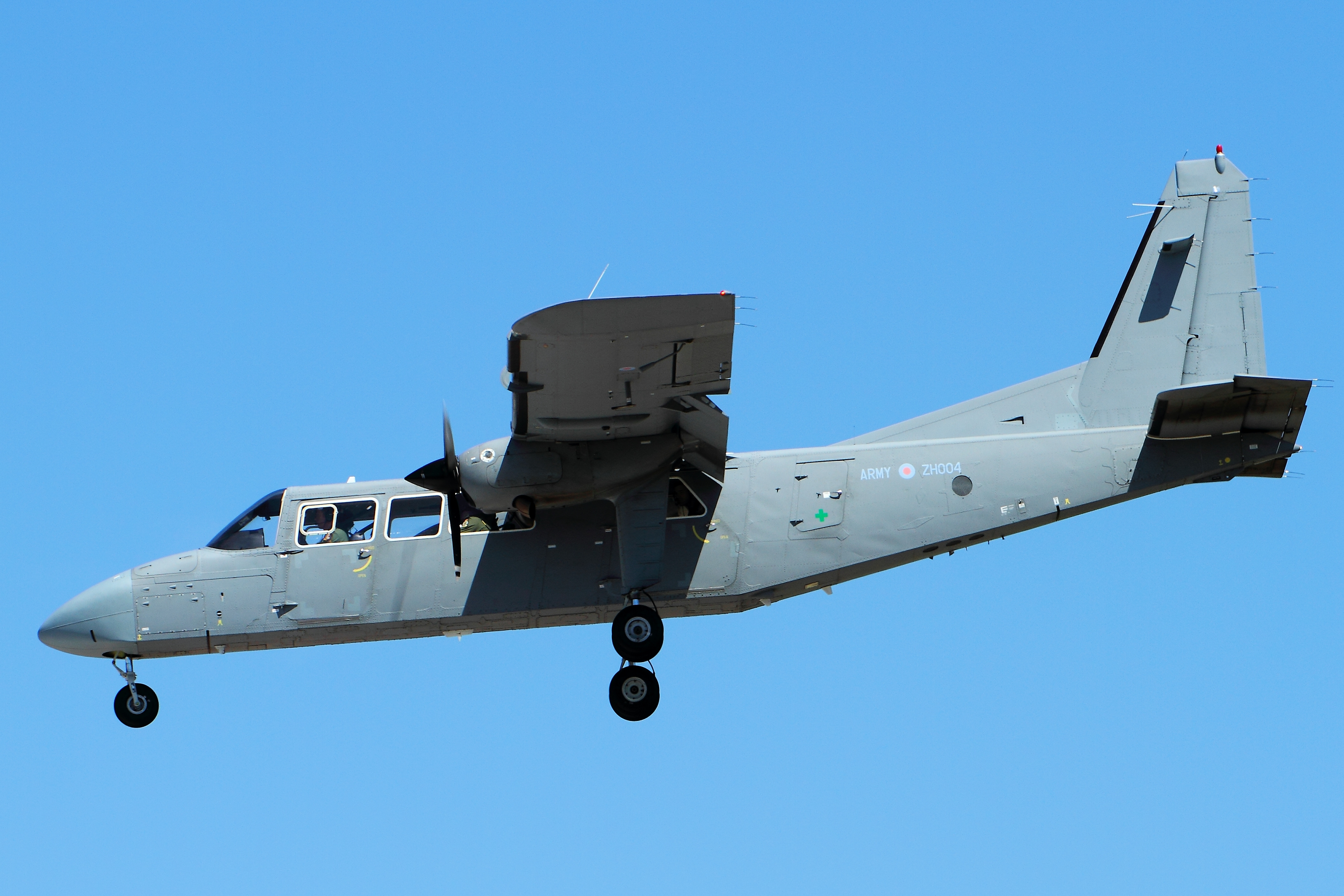
Inflight BN-2T

Fairey Aviation set about the development of a more powerful model, the Turbo Islander, equipped with a pair of Lycoming LTP101 turboprop engines. However, testing revealed that the LTP101 engines were too powerful for the aircraft; thus, following a period of re-designing, the project evolved into the Turbine Islander (BN-2T), equipped with a pair of Allison 250 turboprop engines instead. However, Fairey encountered financial difficulty, resulting in the Fairey Britten-Norman company entering receivership and the firm's acquisition by Oerlikon Buerle of Switzerland, leading to the formation of Pilatus Britten-Norman, whereupon some production activity was transferred back to Bembridge.

Another development was a turbo-normalizing system with RaJay turbocharger for the -2, -3, -6, -8, and -9 models allowing full power up to 14,000 feet (4,300 metres) with attendant increase in true airspeed and takeoff and climb performance. Presently Talco in Texas holds the STC.

In 1969, an improved version, the BN-2A Islander, conducted its maiden flight. It incorporated aerodynamic and flight equipment improvements, such as lower-drag engine cowlings and undercarriage, an improved interior, and an expanded rear baggage area with external access. In 1970, to improve hot-and-high performance, more powerful Lycoming O-540-K1-B5 engines were made available, alongside optional tiptanks and an elongated nose to house baggage.

In 1975 Philippine Aerospace Development Corporation was granted License production and programmed depot maintenance (PDM) of BN2 Islander wherein 67 units were produced from 1975-1995.

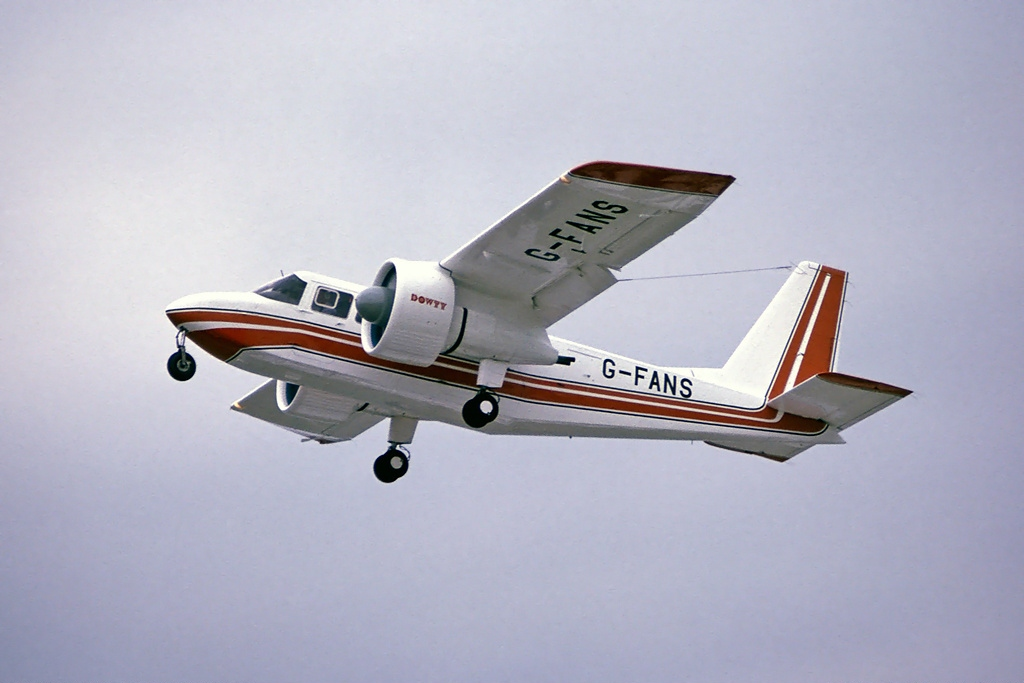
Islander equipped with ducted fans, 1978

In 1977, a single standard BN-2 was refitted with Dowty Rotol ducted fans. The ducted fan produced less noise than conventional propeller propulsion. Some structural strengthening of the main wing spar at the root was required due to the extra weight. This aircraft was subject to 18 months of flying trials to test the suitability of the ducted fan as a means of reducing aircraft noise; these tests reportedly demonstrated a 20 decibel noise reduction as well as increased thrust and reduced pollution.

In 1978, a further improved version, the BN-2B Islander II, was produced as a result of a product improvement program. The BN-2B model involved several changes, including a redesigned cockpit and a reduction in cabin noise levels. In 1980, it was decided to make available turboprop engines for the type, adopting twin Allison 250-B17C engines; when the latter are installed, the aircraft is designated the BN-2T Turbine Islander. The first such BN-2T entered service in 1981.

In February 1999, the acquisition of Romaero, the Romanian manufacturer of the Islander, by Britten-Norman Group was announced. By May 2006, a greater sales emphasis was being placed upon the Defender over the Islander. In December 2006, aerospace publication Flight International observed that: "The only civil aircraft that remains in production in the UK is the tiny Britten-Norman Islander".

In early 2008, B-N was studying a version powered by 350 hp (260 kW) aircraft diesel engines with SMA Engines, already offering the 230 hp (170 kW) SMA SR305-230. In May 2010, Britten-Norman announced that manufacturing of the Islander would be relocated from Romania to a new site in the UK, due to the rising costs of production in Romania.

==== Return to UK manufacture ====
In 2023 Britten-Norman reactivated their original production line at Bembridge in the Isle of Wight and closed down overseas manufacture. New aircraft, to be produced at two per year initially and rising thereafter, are expected to continue the practice of incorporating progressive improvements to the current design. These include a glass cockpit from Garmin.

==== Electric Project Fresson ====
In conjunction with Britten-Norman, Cranfield Aerospace Solutions (CAeS), a subsidiary of Cranfield University, is developing an electric propulsion system for the over 700 Islanders currently operated.

=== Trislander ===
In 1968, the original second Islander prototype was re-used for a further development programme, being modified into a stretched aircraft with greater capacity, referred to as the Super Islander. However, the Super Islander programme was aborted without proceeding to certification. The prototype later received further design changes to produce the three-engined version, the BN-2A Mk III Trislander. This aircraft has a stretched fuselage, modified landing gear and a third engine, which is mounted on the tail. On 11 September 1970, the Trislander prototype conducted its maiden flight, appearing at the 1970 Farnborough Air Show the same day.

== Design ==
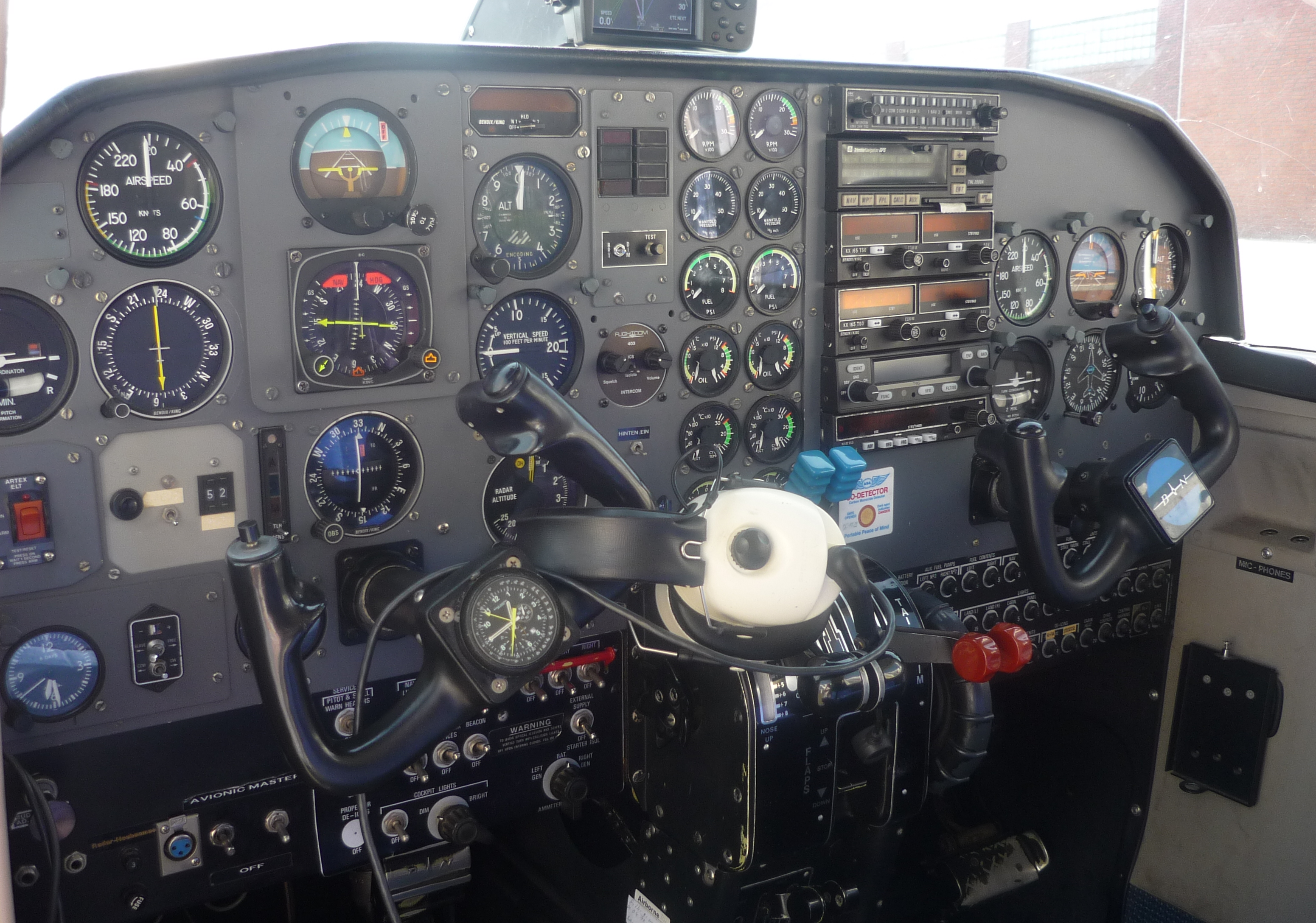
Cockpit of a BN-2 Islander

The Britten-Norman BN-2 Islander is a shoulder-wing cantilever monoplane with a rectangular fuselage and two wing-mounted engines; early aircraft were equipped with a pair of piston engines while later production models may be alternatively fitted with turboprop engines in their place. The rectangular cross section fuselage, which is furnished with a conventional tail unit and fixed tricycle landing gear, can accommodate a single pilot and up to nine passengers in a commuter configuration, or operate in a mixed cargo/passenger capacity. The cabin can be rapidly reconfigured, allowing for a single aircraft to undertake a diverse range of tasks within a minimal period of time. Often referring to the type as "The world's most versatile aircraft", Britten-Norman promotes the Islander's low direct operating costs, minimal maintenance, and its stability in flight as major attributes of the aircraft.

The original Islander was designed with an emphasis upon providing ease of access within the short haul sector to remote locations as a safe, efficient, and profitable transport aircraft. It has been regularly used by such operators, including the frequent use of unprepared rough airstrips and from challenging terrain; the Islander being capable of short takeoff and landing (STOL) operations. The low load height and wide side doors provide for easy access for passenger and cargo operations, while the aircraft's ability to maintain a high takeoff frequency has led to the type's use for parachuting. For operating within noise-sensitive environments, silencers can be equipped on the aircraft's engines and four-bladed propellers can be used.

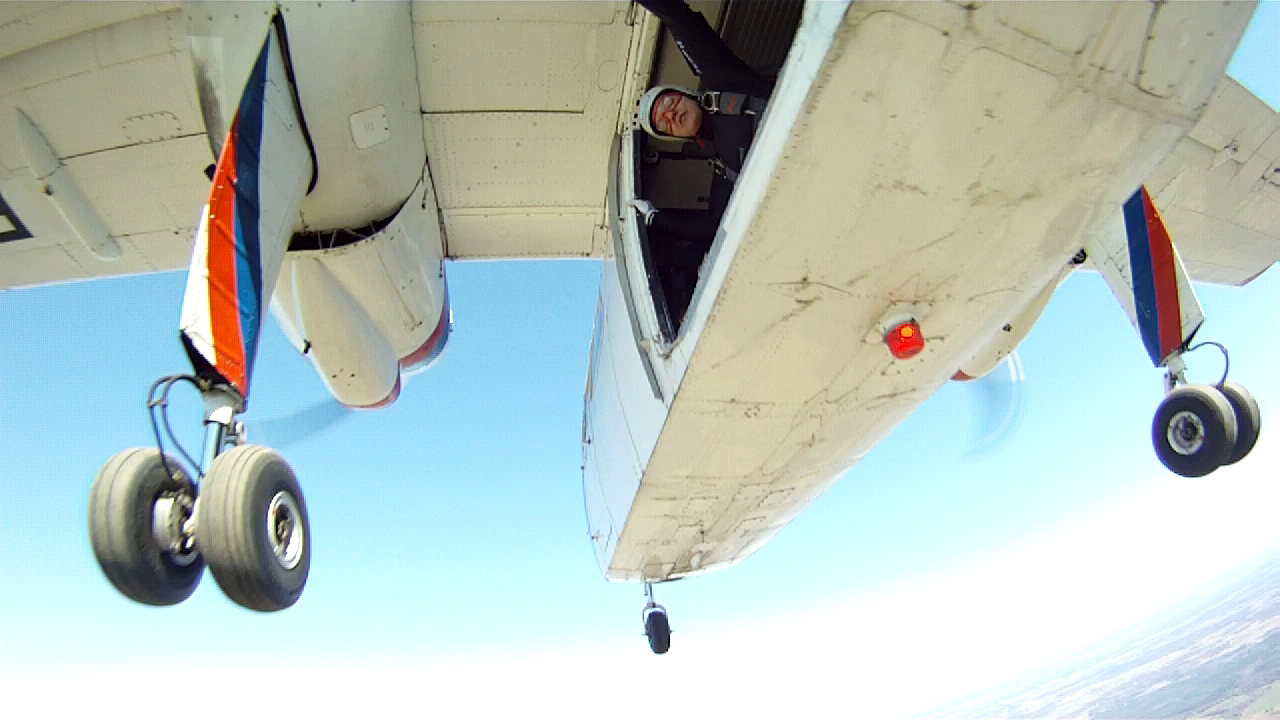
Exit in a parachuting exercise

Designed as a small and inexpensive commuter/utility aircraft, various cabin configurations and equipment loadouts are available to suit a wide variety of different purposes, including charter flights, scheduled flights, agricultural uses, aerial firefighting, air freight VIP/executive transport, aerial surveillance, air ambulance, paradropping, and law enforcement. The design programme can be entirely personalized, allowing each customer to be involved in every area of the aircraft's manufacture to mold it to their preferences. Later versions of the Islander offer various options, including enlarged bay doors, 3-bladed scimitar propellers, low drag fairings, modern interior, ergonomic leather seating, in-flight entertainment systems, and alternative seat arrangements; underwing hardpoints can also be installed for carrying pod, spray booms and other external stores.

== Operational history ==
Immediately following commercial availability, US distributor Jonas Aircraft ordered 30 Islanders, and placed orders for another 112 aircraft within a year. When equipped with four 54-gallon fuel tanks, the Islander was able to ferry itself across the transatlantic route, via Gander International Airport, Newfoundland, for US deliveries. The Islander's long-range capabilities were highlighted when the type won the 1969 London-Sydney air race.

In 1974, sales of the Islander surpassed the 548-order record for British multi-engine commercial aircraft. In 1982, another production milestone was reached with the delivery of the 1,000th Islander. From the 1980s onwards, sales noticeably declined; according to Britten-Norman Chief Executive William Hynett, this was due to the global market having become saturated by the type and there being only a low civil demand for additional aircraft, in part due to the longevity of in-service Islanders. As of 2016, Britten-Norman claim that the Islander is in daily service with roughly 500 operators in more than 120 countries.

Between 1976 and 2006, Scottish airline Loganair operated a number of Islanders as air ambulances, covering areas such as the island communities in the Hebrides. The Islander services Loganair's Westray to Papa Westray flight, the shortest scheduled flight in the world at 1.7 mi (2.7 km); the scheduled flight time including taxiing is two minutes.

Several commuter airlines and general aviation charter operators in the U.S. also flew the Islander including Stol Air Commuter in scheduled passenger service in northern California from their San Francisco International Airport (SFO) hub and Channel Islands Aviation in southern California which used the aircraft for the flights to Channel Islands National Park. Another U.S. commuter airline operator was Wings Airways which operated high frequency shuttle service into the Philadelphia International Airport (PHL).

By October 2019, 800 Islanders were in service including around 600 used for short flights.

On 28 August 2023, Torres Strait Air stated that it is investing $16.3 million to upgrade its fleet with ten new Britten-Norman Islander aircraft.

== Variants ==
BN-2
Prototype first flown in 1966 with two 260 hp (190 kW) Lycoming O-540-E4B5 piston engines.

BN-2A
Production version with minor modification from prototype and increased takeoff weight.

BN-2A-2
A BN-2A with modified flaps, and two 300 hp (220 kW) Lycoming IO-540-K1B5 (fuel injected) engines.

BN-2A-3
A BN-2A-2 with increased wingspan and fitted with extra wingtip fuel tanks.

BN-2A-6
A BN-2A with wing leading edge modifications and two 260 hp (190 kW) Lycoming O-540-E4C5 engine.

BN-2A-7
A BN-2A-6 with increased wingspan and fuel capacity.

BN-2A-8
A BN-2A-6 with droop flaps.

BN-2A-9
A BN-2A-7 with droop flaps.

BN-2A-10
A BN-2A-8 with increased takeoff weight and 270 hp (200 kW) Lycoming TIO-540-H1A (turbo-charged, fuel injected) engines.

BN-2A-20
A BN-2A-2 with increased takeoff weight and minor improvements.

BN-2A-21
A BN-2A-3 with increased takeoff weight.

BN-2A-23
A BN-2A-21 with lengthened nose.

BN-2A-24
A BN-2A-26 with lengthened nose.

BN-2A-25
A BN-2A-27 with lengthened nose.

BN-2A-26
A BN-2A-8 with increased takeoff weight.

BN-2A-27
A BN-2A-9 with increased takeoff weight.

BN-2A-30
A BN-2A-20 fitted with floats. Twin floats were attached to the undercarriage legs and incorporated retractable landing gear.

BN-2A-41
Turbo Islander with lengthened nose, droop flaps and two Lycoming LTP-101 turboprops, first flown in 1977.

Britten-Norman BN-2B Defender

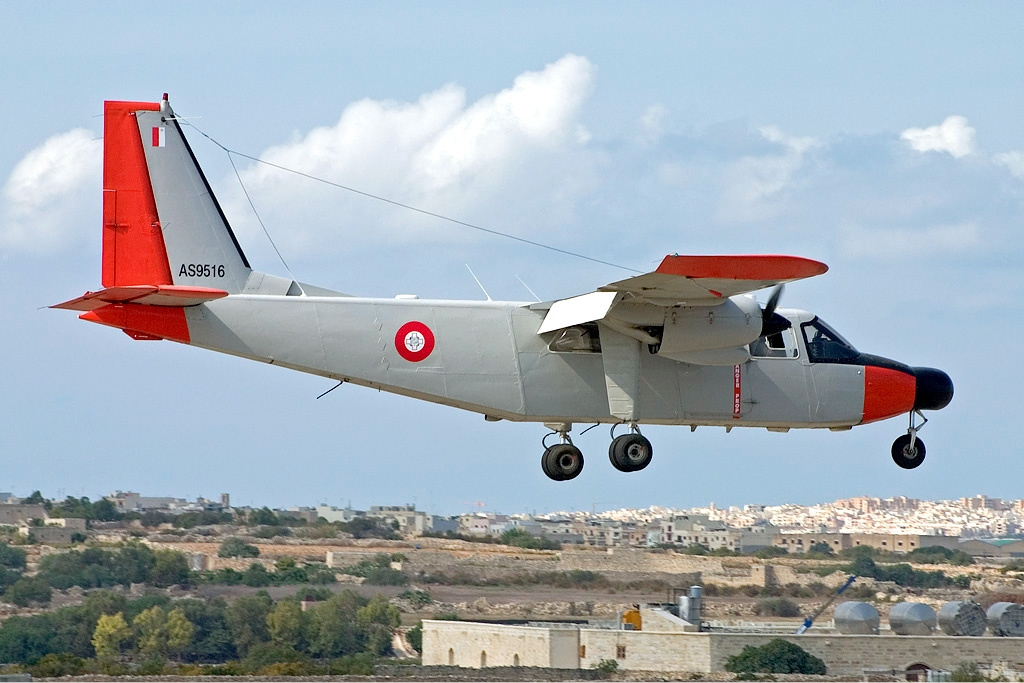
A Maltese Air Force Islander

Defender military variant with 300 hp (220 kW) IO-540-K1B5 engines and underwing hard points and military modifications.

BN-2B-20
A BN-2A-20 with improved soundproofing and increased landing weight and other minor modifications.

BN-2B-21
A BN-2A-21 with Model B improvements.

BN-2B-26
A BN-2A-26 with Model B improvements.

BN-2B-27
A BN-2A-27 with Model B improvements.

BN-2T
Turbine Islander based on BN-2A-26 with two 320 shp (240 kW) Allison 250-B17C turboprops. Seating for up to 9 passengers.

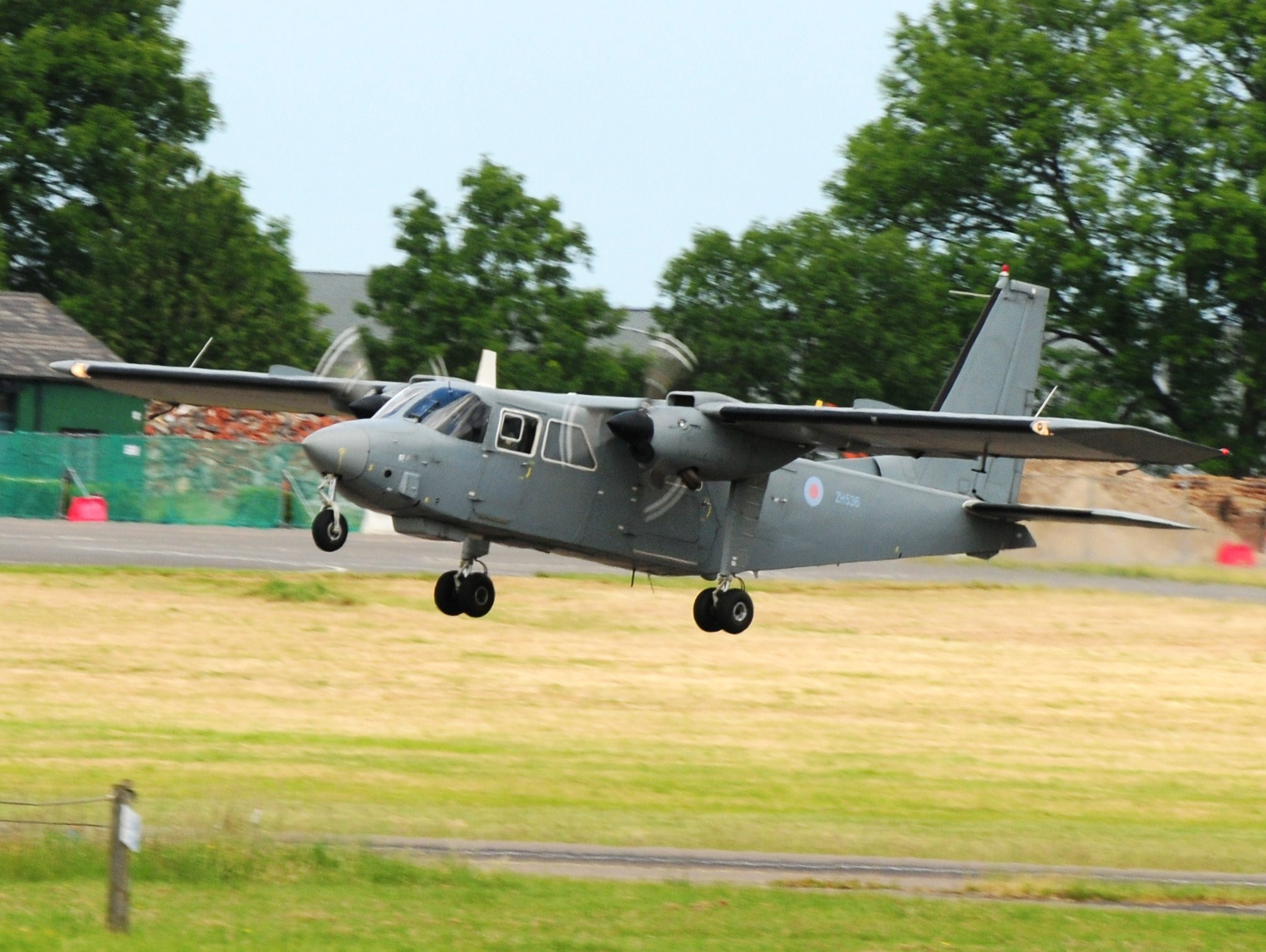
Islander CC2 of the RAF

Islander AL1
Variant of the BN-2T for communications and reconnaissance duties with the British Army; seven built. Used for aerial reconnaissance and photography in Northern Ireland during Operation Banner by No. 1 Flight Army Air Corps based at Aldergrove. 1 Flight was later integrated into No. 651 Squadron. Redesignated Islander R1 in 2019 after being transferred to the Royal Air Force.

Islander CC2 and CC2A
Variant of the BN-2T for the Royal Air Force; three operated. These aircraft were retired from the RAF in 2017.

Maritime-Defender
Armed maritime reconnaissance and patrol aircraft.

BN-2A-III Trislander
Three-engined Trislander, a stretched BN-2A with 18 seats and three 260 hp (190 kW) Lycoming O-540-E4C5 piston engines.

== Operators ==
=== Military and government ===
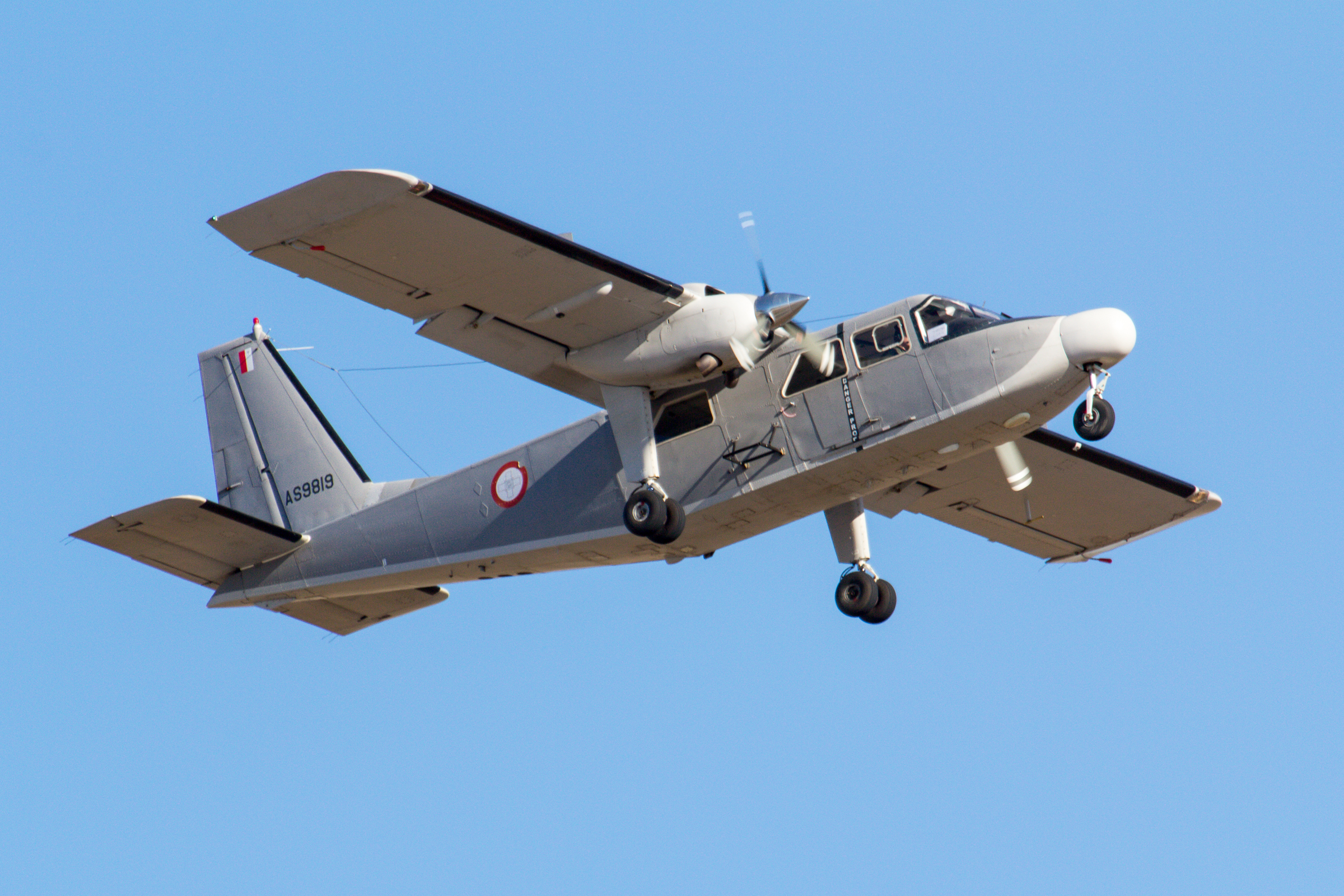
Armed Force of Malta Britten-Norman Islander at the 2015 Malta International Airshow

Abu Dhabi

- Abu Dhabi Defence Force

Angola

- National Air Force of Angola

Antigua and Barbuda

- Antigua and Barbuda Air Wing

Belgium

- Belgian Army

Belize

- Belize Defence Force Air Wing

Botswana

- Botswana Defence Force Air Wing

Cambodia

- Royal Cambodian Air Force

Central African Republic

- Central African Republic Air Force

Ciskei

- Ciskei Defence Force

Cyprus

- Cyprus Air Forces

Denmark

- Danish Home Guard

Finland

- Finnish Air Force (leased)

Falkland Islands

- Falkland Islands Government Air Service

Gambia

- Gambia Armed Forces

Ghana

- Ghana Air Force

Guyana

- Guyana Defence Force

Haiti

- Armed Forces of Haiti

Hong Kong

- Royal Hong Kong Auxiliary Air Force

India

- Indian Naval Air Arm

Indonesia

- Indonesian Army

Ireland

- Irish Air Corps

Israel

- Israeli Air Force

Jamaica

- Jamaica Defence Force

Madagascar

- Military of Madagascar

Malawi

- Military of Malawi

Mali

- Air Force of Mali

Malta

- Maltese Air Wing

Mauritania

- Military of Mauritania

Mauritius

- Mauritius Coast Guard

Mexico

- Mexican Air Force

Myanmar

- Myanmar Air Force

Nepal

- Nepalese Army Air Service

Oman

- Royal Air Force of Oman

Panama

- Panamanian Public Forces

Philippines

- Philippine Navy
- Philippine Coast Guard

Rhodesia

- Rhodesian Air Force

Romania

- Romanian Air Force

Seychelles

- Seychelles Air Force

South Africa

- South African Air Force

Thailand

- Royal Thai Air Force

Turkey

- Military of Turkey

United Arab Emirates

- United Arab Emirates Air Force

United Kingdom

- Police Service of Northern Ireland

Venezuela

- Army of Venezuela

Zaire

- Zaire Air Wing

Zimbabwe

- Air Force of Zimbabwe

=== Civilian ===
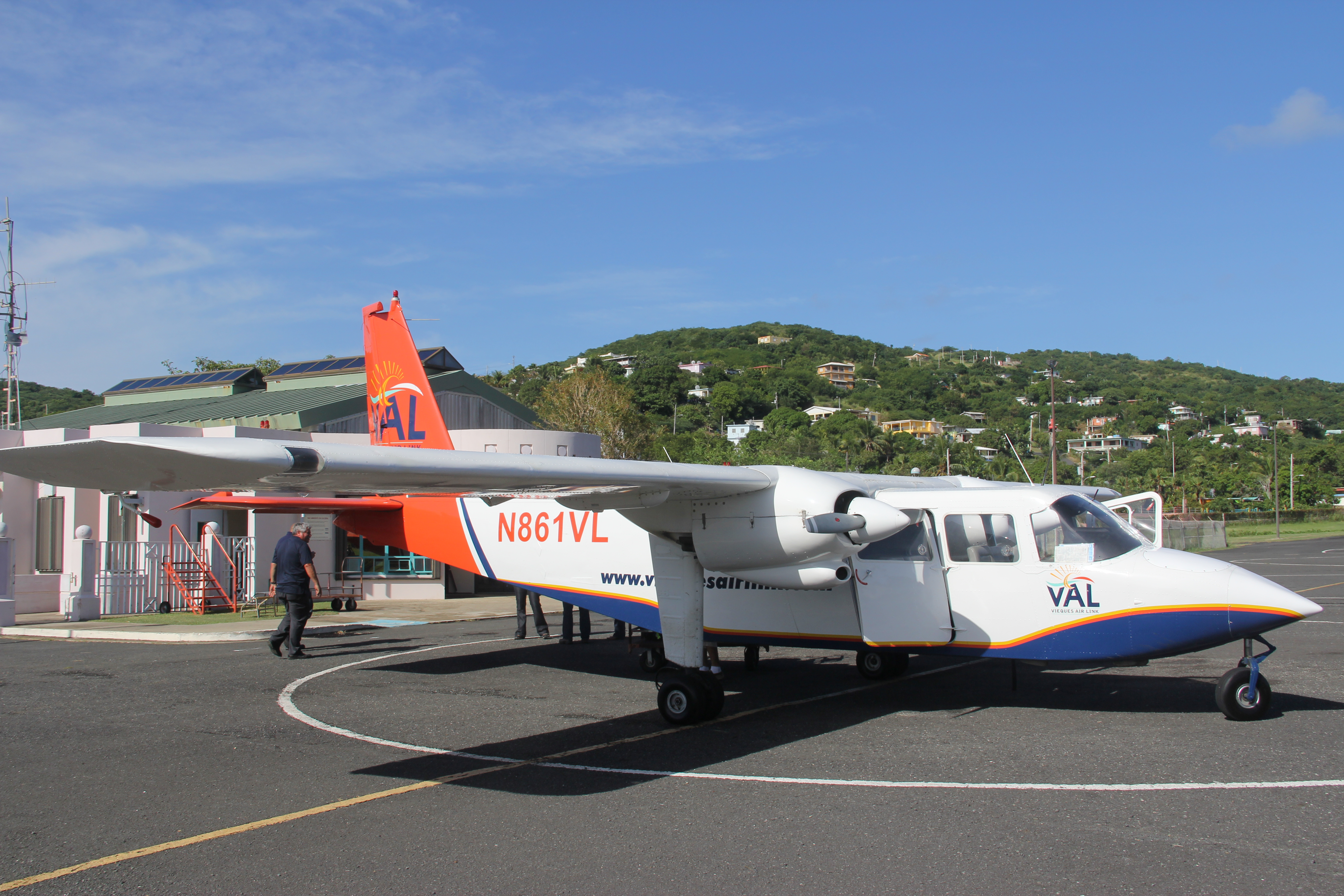
Vieques Air Link Britten-Norman BN-2 Islander at Benjamín Rivera Noriega Airport

Australia

- Par Avion - 1 Islander: VH-ZOU
- Torres Strait Air - 7 Islanders + 10 on order

Bahrain

- Gulf Aviation

Belize

- Maya Island Air- 3 as of 1979.

Brazil

- VOTEC

Canada

- Air Montmagny
- Great River Air
- Sable Aviation
- South Nahanni Airways

Fiji

- Air Fiji

France

- Air Caledonie
- Air Tetiaroa

Germany

- FLN Frisia Luftverkehr
- OFD Ostfriesischer Flugdienst

Greece

- Olympic Aviation

Ireland

- Aer Arann Islands

Montserrat

- FlyMontserrat

New Zealand

- Stewart Island Flights

Puerto Rico

- Air Flamenco

United Kingdom

- Hebridean Air Services
- Isles of Scilly Skybus
- Loganair

United States

- Cape Air
- Crested Butte Air Service
- Gem Air
- Gulf Coast Airlines
- New England Airlines

Vanuatu

- Unity Airlines

=== Former operators ===
Antigua and Barbuda

- LIAT

British Virgin Islands

- Air BVI

Finland

- Finnish Air Force (Britten-Norman BN-2A Islander)

Germany

- Luftverkehr Friesland-Harle
- OLT

Indonesia

- Sabang Merauke Raya Air Charter

Iraq

- Iraqi Air Force

Iceland

- Flugfélag Austurlands
- Flugfélag Vestmannaeyja
- Vængir

Mauritius

- RVL Aviation

New Zealand

- Barrier Air
- Mount Cook Airlines
- Sea Bee Air
- Fly My Sky

Philippines

- Philippine Air Force
- Philippine National Police - 2 Units .The Philippine Constabulary purchased Britten-Norman Islander 2A21 aircraft on September 26, 1979.

Somalia

- Somali Air Force

United Kingdom

- Royal Air Force

United States

- Stol Air Commuter

== Accidents ==
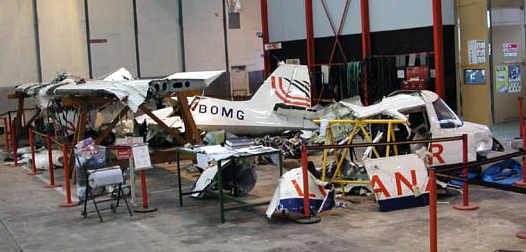
2005 Loganair Islander accident Wreckage

- 1974 Harbor Airlines accident - On 26 December 1974, a Britten-Norman BN-2A crashed 1 mile (1.6 km) north of Seattle-Tacoma International Airport in a snowstorm; the pilot and three of the five passengers died. The cause was determined to be a clogged pitot tube.
- 1975 Aer Arann accident - Aircraft Overran. Written Off
- 1980 Aer Arann accident - Aircraft Overran. Written Off
- 1980 Flugfélag Austurlands Islander accident - On 22 September 1980, a Britten Norman BN-2A Islander flew into fog and crashed into Smjörfjöll mountain region in east Iceland; three on board died.
- 1989 New England Airlines Britten-Norman Islander Crash - 28 November 1989, a BN-2A Islander, N127JL, flying to Westerly crashed into the sea 3 to 5 miles northwest of Block Island. All 8 people on board, 7 passengers and pilot were killed.
- 1994 Sintang crash - On 25 April 1994, a Britten-Norman BN-2A Islander operated by Dirgantara Air Service struck Mount Saran while on descent in poor weather, 10 out of 11 on board died.
- 1996 Loganair Islander accident
- 1998 Pointe-Lebel Air Satellite crash
- 2002 Tarakan crash - On 7 November 2002, a Britten-Norman BN-2A Islander operated by Dirgantara Air Service crashed shortly after takeoff after the pilot encountered engine problems and tried to land back, 7 out of 10 on board died.
- 2005 Loganair Islander accident
- 2009 Divi Divi Airlines crash
- 2005 L.A.B. Flying Service accident
- 2012 FlyMontserrat crash
- 2014 Romania Britten-Norman Islander crash
- 2016 Sunbird Aviation crash
- 2018 Airlines of Tasmania crash - On 8 December 2018, a Britten-Norman BN-2A Islander operated by Airlines of Tasmania crashed in southwest Tasmania in a likely VFR into IMC incident
- 2021 Island Airways crash - On 13 November 2021, a Britten-Norman BN-2A Islander crashed while attempting to land at Welke Airport on Beaver Island, Charlevoix County, Michigan. Four deaths were reported.
- 2022 Air Flamenco crash - On 15 February 2022, a Britten-Norman BN-2A Islander (N821RR) veered off the runway at Culebra Airport (CPX), Puerto Rico doing substantial right wing and propeller damage. None of the three persons on board were injured.
- 2024 Air Taxi Vanuatu crash - On 15 July 2024, a BN-2A Islander operated by Air Taxi Vanuatu crashed close to its destination of Port Vila; one of the five people on board died.

== Specifications (BN-2B Islander) ==
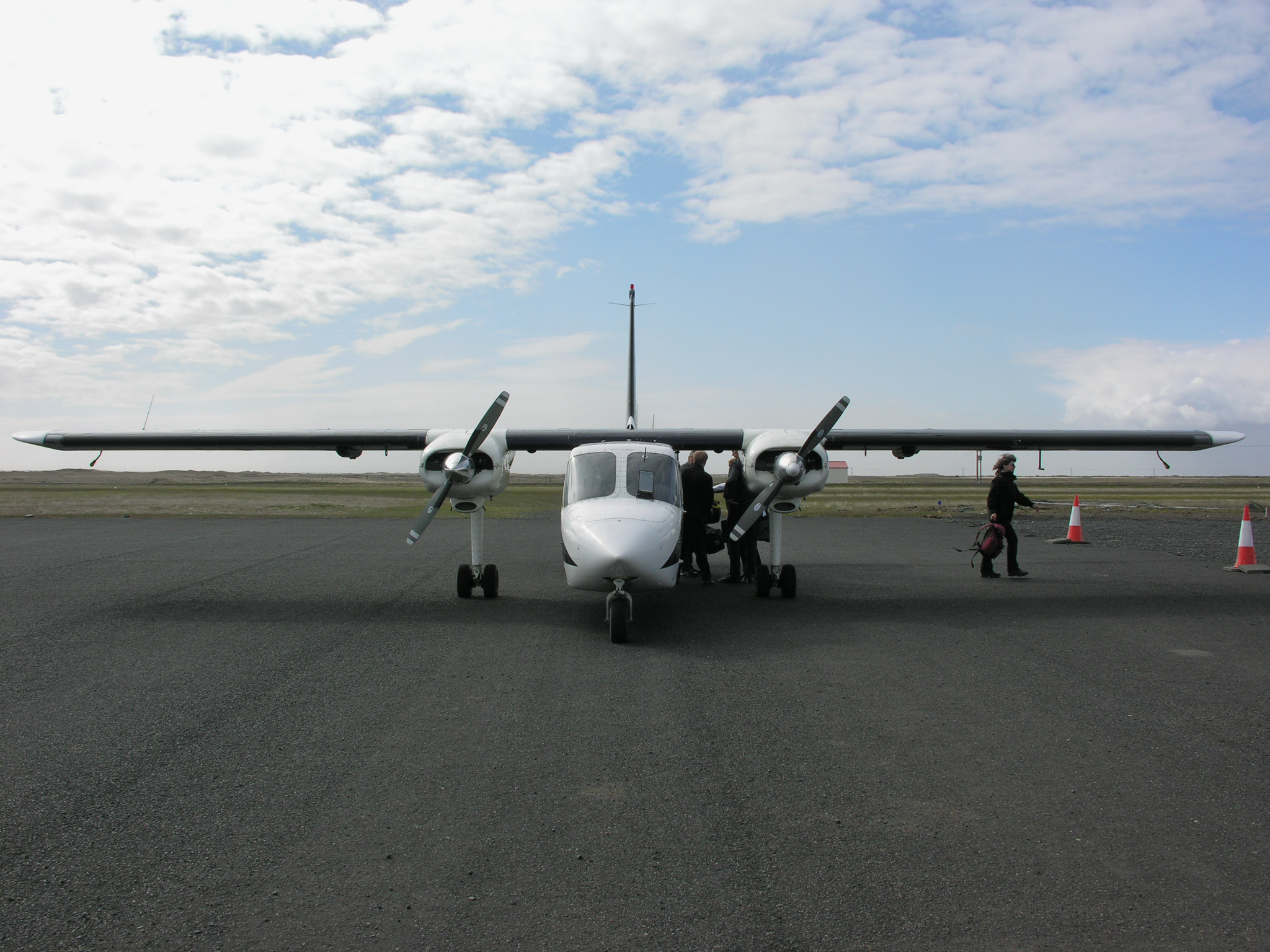
Front view, on ground

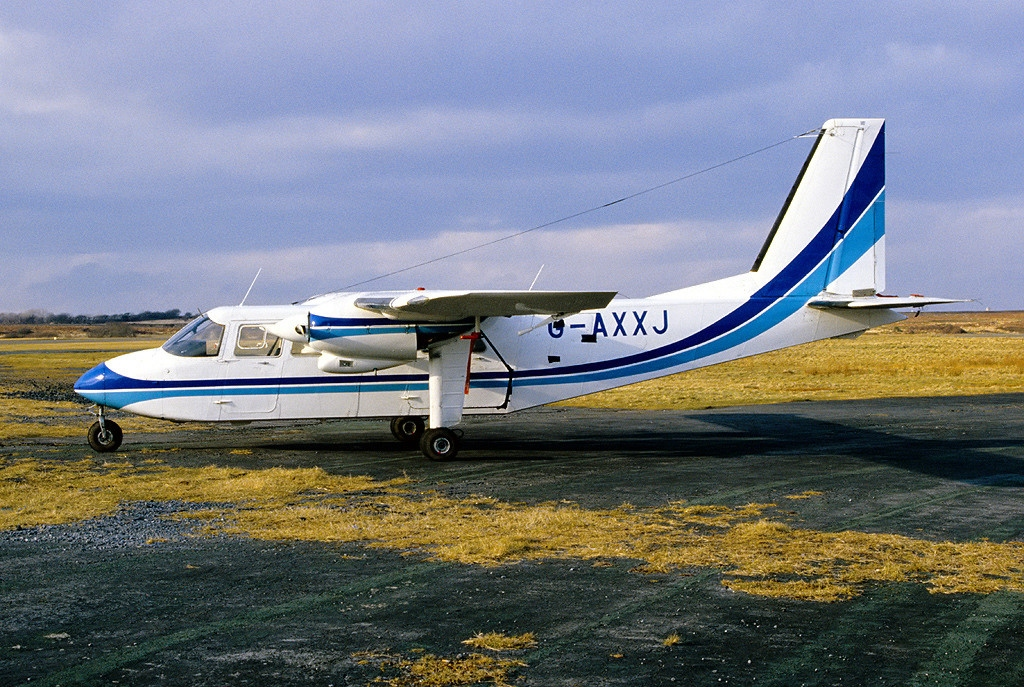
Side view, on ground

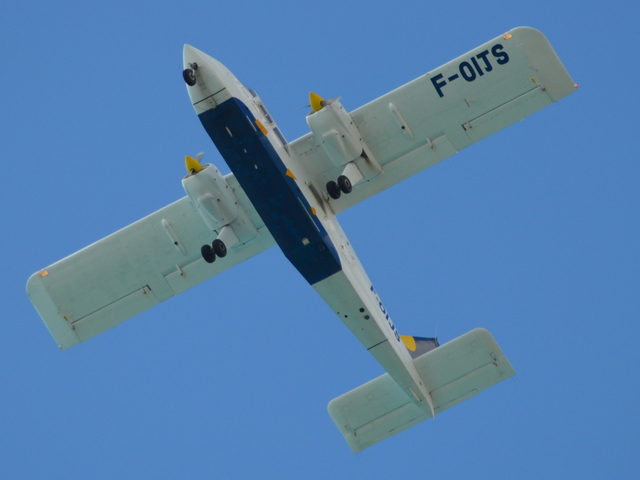
Planform view, showing low aspect ratio wing

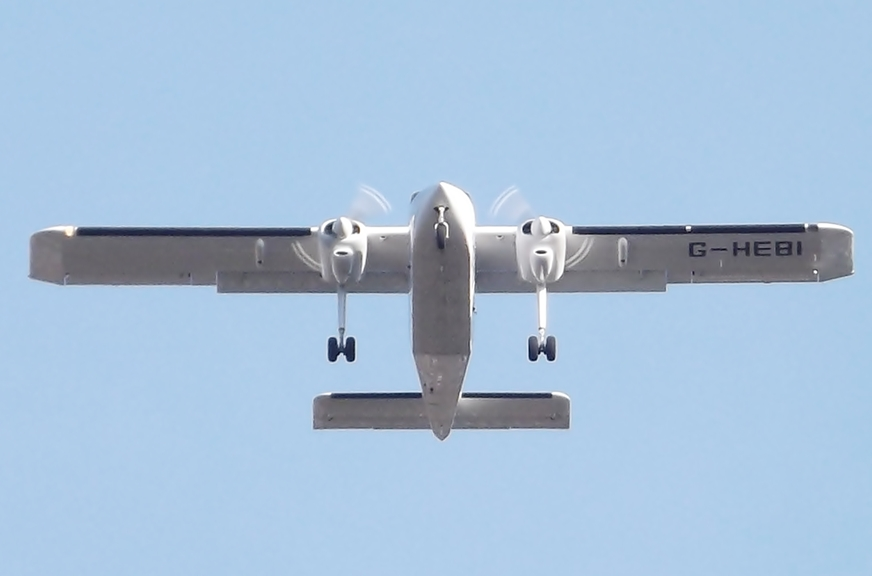
Inflight front view from below

Data from Jane's All the World's Aircraft 1988-89

General characteristics

- Crew: 1
- Capacity: 9 passengers / 2,048 lb (929 kg) maximum payload
- Length: 35 ft 7 3/4 in (10.86 m)
- Wingspan: 49 ft 0 in (14.94 m)
- Height: 13 ft 8 3/4 in (4.18 m)
- Wing area: 325.0 sq ft (30.19 m^{2})
- Aspect ratio: 7.4:1
- Airfoil: NACA 23012
- Empty weight: 4,114 lb (1,866 kg) equipped (without avionics)
- Max takeoff weight: 6,600 lb (2,994 kg)
- Fuel capacity: 137 imp gal (165 US gal; 620 L)
- Powerplant: 2 × Lycoming O-540-E4C5 6-cylinder air-cooled horizontally-opposed piston engines, 260 hp (190 kW) each
- Propellers: 2-bladed Hartzell HC-C2YK-2B constant speed propellers, 6 ft 6 in (1.98 m) diameter

Performance

- Maximum speed: 148 kn (170 mph, 274 km/h) at sea level
- Cruise speed: 130 kn (150 mph, 240 km/h) at 12,000 ft (3,700 m) (59% power)
- Stall speed: 40 kn (46 mph, 74 km/h) (flaps down)
- Never exceed speed: 183 kn (211 mph, 339 km/h)
- Range: 755 nmi (869 mi, 1,398 km) at 130 kn (150 mph; 241 km/h) and 12,000 ft (3,700 m) (59% power, standard fuel)
- Service ceiling: 13,000 ft (4,000 m)
- Rate of climb: 860 ft/min (4.4 m/s) at sea level
- Take-off run to 50 ft (15 m): 1,218 ft (370 m) (at sea level)
- Landing run from 50 ft (15 m): 980 ft (300 m) (at sea level)

== See also ==
Related development

- Britten-Norman Trislander
- Britten-Norman Defender

Aircraft of comparable role, configuration, and era

- Cessna 402
- Cessna 208 Caravan
- Dornier Do 28
- GippsAero GA8 Airvan
- Piper PA-31 Navajo
- Tecnam P2012 Traveller
- Antonov An-2
