= Warraber Islet, Queensland =

Warraber Islet
- Suburb
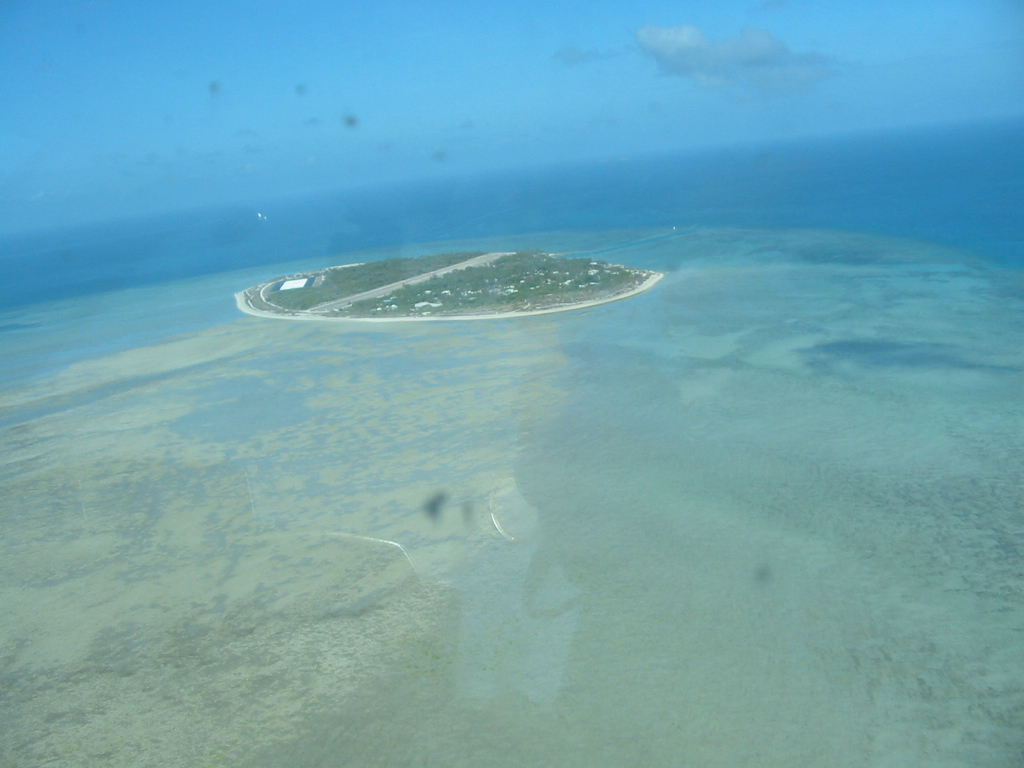
- Warraber Island, 2011

- Interactive map of Warraber Islet
- Coordinates: 10.2075°S 142.8244°E
- Country: Australia
- State: Queensland
- LGA: Torres Strait Island Region

Government
  - State electorate: Cook
  - Federal division: Leichhardt

Area
  - Total: 0.7 km^{2} (0.27 sq mi)

Population
  - Total: 287 (2021 census)
  - Density: 410/km^{2} (1,060/sq mi)
- Time zone: UTC+10:00 (AEST)
- Postcode: 4875
Suburbs around Warraber Islet
| Torres Strait | Burrar Islet | Coral Sea |
| Torres Strait | Warraber Islet | Coral Sea |
| Torres Strait | Guijar Islet | Coral Sea |

Warraber Islet is an island locality in the Torres Strait Island Region, Queensland, Australia. It consists of a single island, Sue Islet (also known as Warraber), the middle island of The Three Sisters. The only town is Sue Island on the eastern part of the island. In the 2021 census, Warraber Islet had a population of 287 people.

== Geography ==
Warraber Island Airport bisects the island, running from the north-west to the south-east (10.2073°S 142.8236°E).

== Demographics ==
In the 2016 census, Warraber Islet had a population of 245 people.

In the 2021 census, Warraber Islet had a population of 287 people.

== Education ==
Warraber Island Campus is a primary (Early Childhood-6) campus of Tagai State College on Yessie Street in the town of Sue Island (10.2063°S 142.8279°E).

There are no secondary schools on the island. The nearest government secondary school is on Thursday Island.
