= List of Torres Strait Islands =

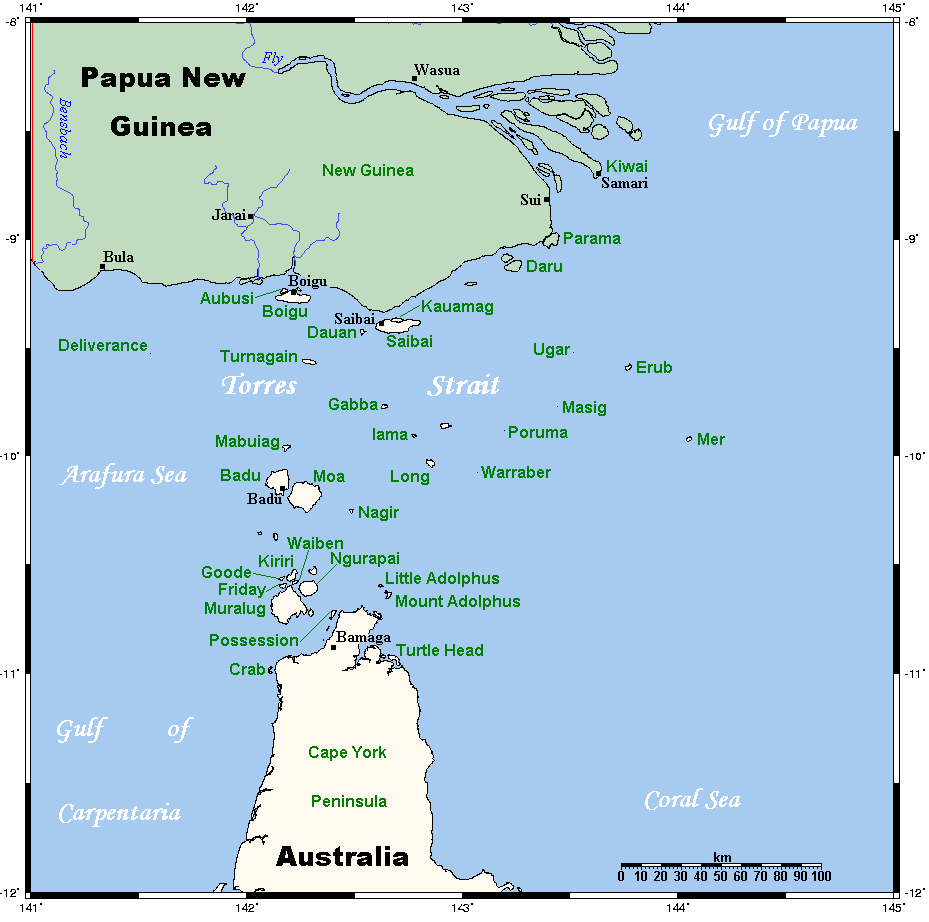
Map of the Torres Strait Islands

The Torres Strait Islands are a group of at least 274 small islands in the Torres Strait between Queensland, Australia and Papua New Guinea.

This is a list of the named islands and island groups in the Torres Strait. In addition there are unnamed islands and named and unnamed rocks.

Almost all of the islands in the Torres Strait are part of Australia; consequently all entries in this table are in Australia unless noted as being in Papua New Guinea.

== Table of islands ==
Name	Other names	Position	Group	Population	Area (km²)	Freehold?	Notes
Aipus Island		9.941°S 142.172°E	Belle Vue Islands				
Akone Islet		10.66730112°S 142.6700377°E					
Albany Island		10.72981076°S 142.6053586°E					
Allison Islet	Nur Islet	10.100278°S 142.08139°E					
Anchor Cay		9.36194°S 144.09889°E					
Arden Island	Garboy Island	9.868334°S 143.171112°E	Belle Vue Islands				
Aubussi Island		9.23389°S 142.169724°E	Talbot Islands				
Aukane Islet		9.868055°S 143.393616°E	Bourke Isles				
Aureed Island		9.953611°S 143.289734°E	Bourke Isles				
Badu Island	Mulgrave Island	10.115556°S 142.144714°E		690	97.8		
Barn Island	Parau Island	10.839058°S 142.318069°E					
Barney Island	Tuin	10.218888°S 142.166382°E					
Belle Vue Islands		9.934444°S 142.161377°E					
Bet Islet	Burrar Islet	10.145833°S 142.819443°E	The Three Sisters	0	0.2		
Boigu Island		9.260278°S 142.213608°E	Talbot Islands	270	72.2		
Bond Island		10.073509°S 142.26445°E					
Booby Island		10.604167°S 141.910828°E					
Bourke Island		9.883234°S 143.484436°E					
Bourke Isles		9.84417°S 143.40222°E					
Bramble Cay		9.1425°S 143.87611°E					
Brewis Island		10.8875°S 142.69417°E					
Browne Island	Ngul	10.223611°S 142.153885°E					
Bush Islet		10.70888085°S 142.5978684°E					
Campbell Island	Tappoear Island	9.56018°S 143.492767°E					
Canoe Cay		9.70028°S 143.83361°E					
Canoe Island	Dadali	10.343888°S 142.108612°E					
Cap Islet	Muquar Island	9.836007°S 142.714996°E	Belle Vue Islands				
Castle Island	Bakilai	10.047123°S 142.157776°E					
Channel Island		10.35184°S 142.228058°E					
Cheropo Island		10.68898058°S 142.2808592°E					
Clarke Island	Tukupai	10.207953°S 142.145828°E					
Coconut Island	Poruma Island, Parremar Island, Cocoa Nut Island	10.048612°S 143.06778°E		180	0.54		
Crab Island	Moent	10.973055°S 142.105835°E					
Dalrymple Islet	Damuth Island	9.609445°S 143.303055°E					
Darnley Island	Erub Island	9.586945°S 143.770554°E		316	5.5		
Daua Island	Dowar Island, Dauar	9.94389°S 144.02583°E			0.37		
Dauan Island	Cornwallis Island	9.42323389°S 142.5361169°E	Murray Islands	120	4		
Dayman Island	Teran	10.76159026°S 142.3736798°E					
Deliverance Island	Warul Kawa	9.516854°S 141.571945°E					
Dove Islet		9.996389°S 143.029434°E					
Dugong Islet		10.52004517°S 143.1001704°E					
Dumaralug Island		10.764059°S 142.213074°E					
Duncan Islands		10.236667°S 142.079437°E					
East Cay		9.39194°S 144.21778°E					
East Strait Island		10.49564064°S 142.4504092°E					
Eborac Island		10.68235038°S 142.5341391°E					
Entrance Island	Zuna Island	10.718225°S 142.295853°E					
		10.042778°S 142.06778°E	Farewell Islets				
Flat Islet		10.11806°S 142.07472°E					
Florence Island	Talab	9.956289°S 142.210831°E	Belle Vue Islands				
Friday Island	Gealug Island	10.596837°S 142.165283°E		20	4.8		
Gabba Island	Gerbar Island	9.765174°S 142.633331°E					
Gainaulai Islet		10.31684208°S 142.0927734°E					
Getullai Island		10.189722°S 142.514999°E					
Goods Island	Palilug	10.562672°S 142.159729°E					
Great Woody Island	Kai Yalubi Island	10.7040408°S 142.3526891°E					
Green Islet	Ilapnab	10.191112°S 142.117783°E					
Half Way Island		10.105556°S 143.320282°E					
Hammond Island	Keriri Island	10.54572715°S 142.2141809°E		204	14.5		
Hawkesbury Island	Warral Island	10.37103572°S 142.1315632°E					
High Island	Wurrka	10.725169°S 142.414185°E					
High Island	Wia	10.200277°S 142.1689°E					
Horn Island	Narupai	10.607114°S 142.28418°E		650	53.8		
Iadi Island		9.931012154°S 142.1577759°E	Belle Vue Islands				
Ida Island		10.70964062°S 142.5579888°E					
Johnson Islet		10.65787222°S 142.7542657°E					
Kabbikane Islet		9.819346°S 143.40831°E	Bourke Isles				
Kamutnab Islet		9.961666°S 142.152222°E	Belle Vue Islands				
Kanig Island		10.24239826°S 142.0827789°E	Duncan Islands				
Kapuda Islet		10.564893°S 142.224731°E					
Karniga Island		10.76732017°S 142.38718°E					
Kaub Islets		9.960555077°S 142.210556°E	Belle Vue Islands				
Kaumag Island		9.367678°S 142.696121°E					
Keatinge Islet		10.62694°S 142.66333°E					
Keats Island	Homogar Islet ?, Umaga Parish	9.684167°S 143.430283°E	Yorke Islands				
Kerr Islet		9.60889°S 141.568893°E					
Kodall Island		9.740001°S 143.446945°E	Yorke Islands				
Kongan Rock		9.945178986°S 142.1738892°E	Belle Vue Islands				
Kunai Islet		10.583055°S 142.176392°E					
Lacey Island		10.611667°S 142.610001°E					
Layoak Islet		9.862223°S 143.308334°E	Bourke Isles				
Little Adolphus Island		10.59412085°S 142.6157781°E					
Little Ida Island		10.72055531°S 142.5572205°E					
Little Roko Island		10.73593028°S 142.4191598°E					
Little Woody Island	Meggi Yalubi Island	10.71531069°S 142.3442993°E					
Lowry Islet		10.101111°S 142.818054°E					
Mabuiag Island	Jervis Island	9.954344918°S 142.1808474°E	Belle Vue Islands	50	7.5		
Mai Islet		10.72151094°S 142.6248383°E					
Markilug Islet	Markailag	10.77378°S 142.393356°E					
Marsden Islet	Eegarbu	9.711111°S 143.362228°E	Yorke Islands				
Marte Island		9.934345245°S 142.1636047°E	Belle Vue Islands				
Masig Island		9.749445°S 143.407501°E	Yorke Islands				
Meddler Island	Gaibait	10.702°S 142.383°E					
Meer Island	Maer Island, Mer Island, Murray Island	9.917°S 144.050°E	Murray Islands	485	4.29		
Meth Islet		10.223°S 142.067°E	Duncan Islands				
Middle Brother		10.712°S 142.681°E					
Mimi Islet		9.950°S 143.400°E	Bourke Isles				
Mipa Islet		9.960456848°S 142.1711121°E	Belle Vue Islands				
Moa Island	Banks Island	10.183°S 142.267°E		394	171.7		
Moimi Island		9.233°S 142.250°E	Talbot Islands				
Morilug Islet		10.822°S 142.6832°E					
Mouinndo Islet		10.828°S 142.366°E					
Mount Adolphus Island	Mori	10.673°S 142.652°E					
Mount Ernest Island	Nagheer Island	10.250°S 142.483°E					
Murangi Islet		10.695°S 142.493°E					
Nepean Island	Attagoy Island	9.567°S 143.650°E					
Nicklin Islet		10.671°S 142.650°E					
North Brother		10.704336°S 142.670013°E					
North Island		9.950°S 142.200°E					
North Island		10.028234°S 142.128891°E					
North Possession Island	Iem Island	10.082°S 142.327°E					
North West Islet		10.667°S 142.100°E					
Obelisk Islet		10.100°S 142.100°E					
Packe Island	Tarilag Island	10.743°S 142.223°E	Thursday Islands	10	0.7		
Parama Island	Bampton (former)	9.00250°S 143.41528°E					Papua New Guinea
Passage Island	Bupu	9.977°S 142.2393°E	Belle Vue Islands				
Pearce Cay	Mallicamas	9.500°S 143.283°E					
Pelican Islet		9.968054771°S 142.2158356°E	Belle Vue Islands				
Phipps Island	Zurat	10.277°S 142.102°E					
Pita Dabai Island		10.19083309°S 142.1741791°E					
Poll Islet	Guijar Islet	10.200°S 142.833°E	The Three Sisters				
Port Lihou Island	Yeta	10.43°S 142.14°E	Inner islands				
Portlock Island	Kulbi	10.117°S 142.359°E					
Possession Island	Tuined, Bedanug	10.725447°S 142.398071°E					
Prince of Wales Island	Muralag Island	10.684°S 142.185°E		20	204.6		
Puigulag Islet		9.96583271°S 142.2138824°E	Belle Vue Islands				
Pulu Islet		9.957°S 142.163°E	Belle Vue Islands				
Pumpkin Island	Ngurthai	10.02083302°S 142.1208344°E					
Pururai Islet		9.941667°S 142.179443°E	Belle Vue Islands				
Quoin Island		10.713°S 142.370°E				Yes	
Red Fruit Islet		9.936666°S 142.178345°E	Belle Vue Islands				
Red Island		10.884°S 142.359°E					
Red Wallis Island		10.849°S 142.026°E					
Rennel Island	Mauar	9.767°S 143.267°E	Yorke Islands				
Roberts Islet		9.967°S 143.117°E	Bourke Isles				
Roko Island		10.741°S 142.410°E					
Round Island		10.07444°S 142.09583°E					
Round Island		10.54143164°S 142.1911879°E					
Saddle Island		10.167°S 142.683°E					
Saibai Island		9.390°S 142.620°E		317	107.9		
Salter Island		10.598°S 142.637°E					
Sassie Island		10.033°S 142.850°E					
Scott Island		9.9625°S 142.209991°E	Belle Vue Islands				
Smith Cay		9.750°S 143.333°E	Yorke Islands				
South Brother		10.718781°S 142.688339°E					
South Island	Aia	10.045456°S 142.131668°E					
Spencer Island	Kulbai Kulbai	10.290°S 142.101°E					
Stephens Island	Hogar, Ugar Island	9.507°S 143.545°E		100	0.35		
Stonehenge	Gainaulai Islet	10.316944°S 142.092773°E					
Suarji Island		10.167°S 142.517°E					
Subur Islet		9.972°S 142.217°E	Belle Vue Islands				
Sue Islet	Warraber Islet	10.207°S 142.825°E	The Three Sisters	216	0.8		
Tern Island		10.998334°S 142.758896°E					
Tetley Island		10.7264217°S 142.7283669°E					
The Three Sisters		10.197223°S 142.825562°E					
Three Month Island		10.18388939°S 142.1688995°E					
Thursday Island	Wai-Ben, Waiben	10.579°S 142.220°E		2,682	3.5		
Tik Island		10.17750072°S 142.1761169°E					
Tobin Cay		9.612778°S 143.661377°E					
Tobin Island	Zagarsum	10.105278°S 142.344437°E					
Travers Island	Warral Island	10.368°S 142.363°E					
Tree Island		10.071111°S 142.069717°E					
Tree Island	Iul Island	10.704°S 142.597°E					
Trochus Island		10.92199019°S 142.6302797°E					
Tudu Island	Warrior Island	9.800°S 142.967°E					
Tuesday Islets		10.55174248°S 142.3456073°E					
Tuluaa Islet		10.84385983°S 142.3489806°E					
Turnagain Island	Buru Island	9.567°S 142.283°E					
Turtle Head Island		10.930°S 142.680°E					
Turtle Island		10.889°S 142.696°E				Yes	
Turtle Island	#35422	10.73622002°S 142.2556798°E					
Turu Cay		9.817°S 141.417°E					
Twin Island	Nelgee Island	10°27′46″S 142°26′32″E					
Underdown Islet		9.483°S 143.867°E					
Wai-Weer Islet		10.571111°S 142.177231°E					
Warakuikul Talab Island	Middle Island	9.950°S 142.221°E	Belle Vue Islands				
Wassel Island		10.74806°S 142.40583°E					
Watson Cay		10.040833°S 142.452225°E					
Waua Islet	Wyer Island, Waier Island	9.48°S 144.037°E	Murray Islands		0.22		
Wednesday Island	Maururra	10.527°S 142.307°E					
West Island	Ului	10.360°S 142.053°E					
Whale Island	Matu	10.246°S 142.071°E					
Widul Island		9.945°S 142.160°E	Belle Vue Islands				
Wilson Island	Maitak	10.233°S 142.083°E	Duncan Islands				
Womer Cay		10.793889°S 142.976654°E					
Woody Wallis Island		10.882°S 142.035°E					
Wuwurrka Islet		10.76100234°S 142.3941732°E					
Yam Island	Iama, Turtle Backed Island	9.900°S 142.767°E	Bourke Isles	338	2.6		
Yargas Island		10.18277836°S 142.1730652°E					
York Island		10.684°S 142.529°E					
Yorke Island	Masig Island	9.745°S 143.434°E		100	2		
Zagai Island	Dungeness Island	9.850°S 142.917°E					
