= Turtle Island (Newcastle Bay) =

Island in Queensland, Australia

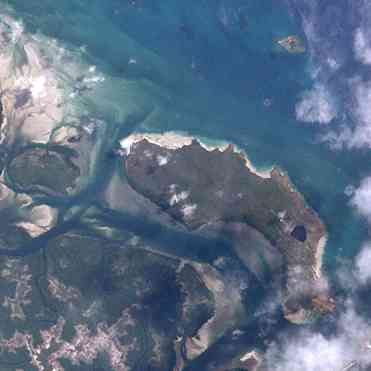
- Turtle Island (top right) with Turtle Head Island (centre) and Trochus Island (middle left).

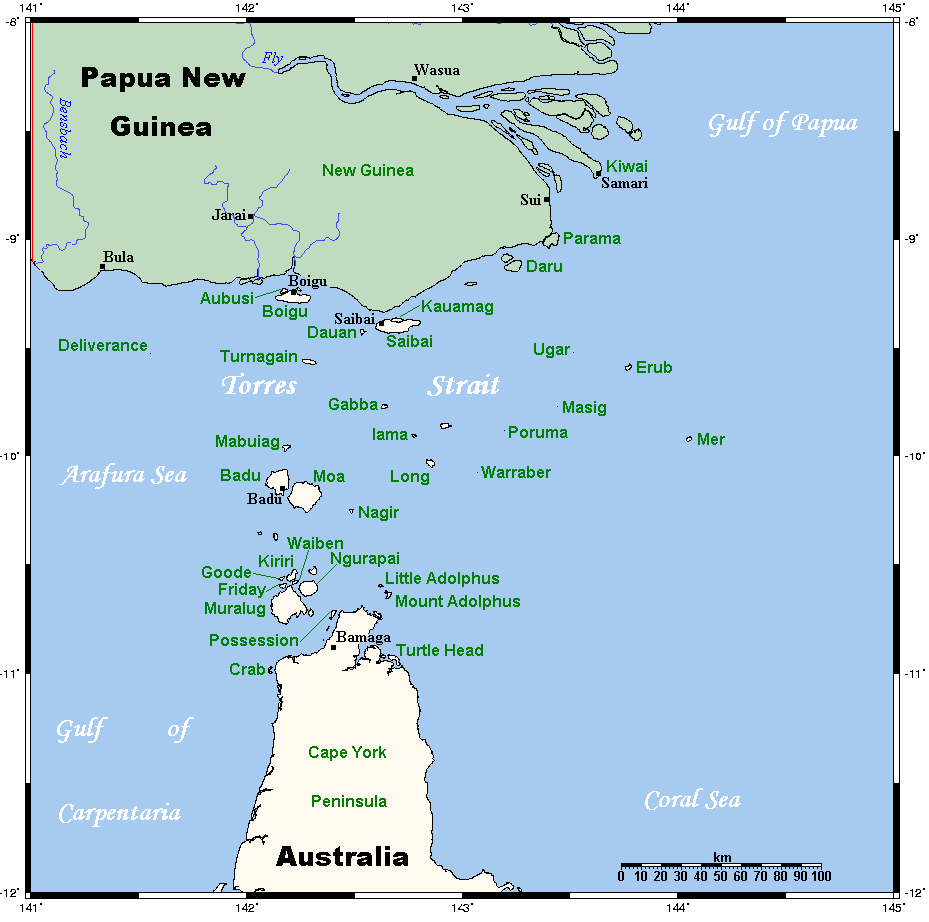
- A map of the Torres Strait Islands showing Turtle Island in the south eastern waters of Torres Strait, east of the Cape York Peninsula

Geography
- Location: Great Barrier Reef Marine Park, Northern Australia
- Coordinates: 10°53′20″S 142°41′46″E
- Archipelago: Torres Strait Islands
- Adjacent to: Torres Strait

Administration
- Australia
- State: Queensland
- Local government area: Shire of Torres

Demographics
- Ethnic groups: Torres Strait Islanders

Turtle Island is an island of the Torres Strait Islands archipelago, located in the Great Barrier Reef Marine Park, east of Cape York Peninsula, in Queensland, Australia.

The island is located in Newcastle Bay at the mouth of Escape River and Middle River, not far from Jackey Jackey Creek and adjacent to the Apudthama National Park. The island lies approximately 30 km (19 mi) southeast of Bamaga.

In the 19th century, ships were advised not to anchor to leeward of the island because it was unsafe.

== Features ==
The island is rocky and there is an extensive reef adjacent to it on the island's west side. There are mangrove bushes.

== See also ==
- List of Torres Strait Islands
