= Halfway Island =

Halfway Island is the name of several places:

- Halfway Island (Palmer Archipelago) an island in the Palmer Archipelago, Antarctica
- Halfway Island, one of several islands in Canada
- Halfway Island, an island off the east coast of Queensland, Australia
- Halfway Island, a place (or maybe an island) in Alaska, United States
- Halfway Island, an island in Hammond, NY United States

== See also ==
- Halfway Islet - an island that is part of the Great Barrier Reef
- Midway Island
