= SS Siberia Maru =

A number of steamships have been named Siberia Maru, including:

- SS Siberia Maru (1901), 11,814 GRT
- SS Siberia Maru (1909), 3,461 GRT
