= Sue Island, Queensland =

Sue Island Queensland
- Coordinates: 10.2062°S 142.8277°E
- Postcode(s): 4875
- Time zone: AEST (UTC+10:00)
- LGA(s): Torres Strait Island Region
- State electorate(s): Cook
- Federal division(s): Leichhardt

Sue Island is a town in the locality of Warraber Islet in the Torres Strait Island Region, Queensland, Australia.

== Geography ==
The town is on the north-western part of Warraber Islet.

== Education ==
Warraber Island Campus is a primary (Early Childhood-6) campus of Tagai State College on Yessie Street (10.2063°S 142.8279°E).

There are no secondary schools on the island. The nearest government secondary school is the secondary campus of Tagai State College on Thursday Island, where there are boarding facilities
