= Poll Island =

Island in Queensland, Australia

Poll Islet
Native name: Guijar
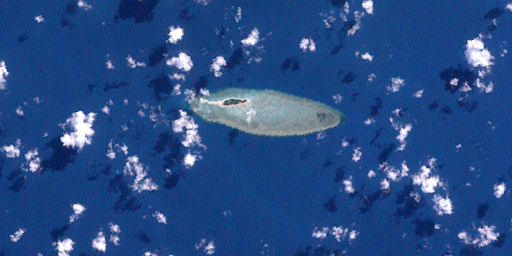
- Satellite image

- Location within Australia

Geography
- Location: Oceania
- Coordinates: 10°15′17″S 142°49′49″E
- Archipelago: The Three Sisters (Queensland)
- Adjacent to: Pacific Ocean
- Area: 0.114 km^{2} (0.044 sq mi)

Administration
- Australia

Demographics
- Population: Uninhabited

Additional information
- Time zone: AEST (UTC+10)

Poll Islet, (also known as Guijar or Poll Island), is an Australian island in the center of the Torres Strait Islands. It lies in the southern part of The Three Sisters island group and is located 5.2 kilometres (3.2 mi) south off Sue Island, the middle and only inhabited island in The Three Sisters. It is within the Guijar Islet locality in the Torres Strait Island Region local government area.

Poll Islet has a surface area of about 11 hectares, and is enclosed by a 5 km^{2} oval-shaped coral reef known as the Poll Islet Reef.

== See also ==
- List of Torres Strait Islands
