= Governor Ready (1825 ship) =

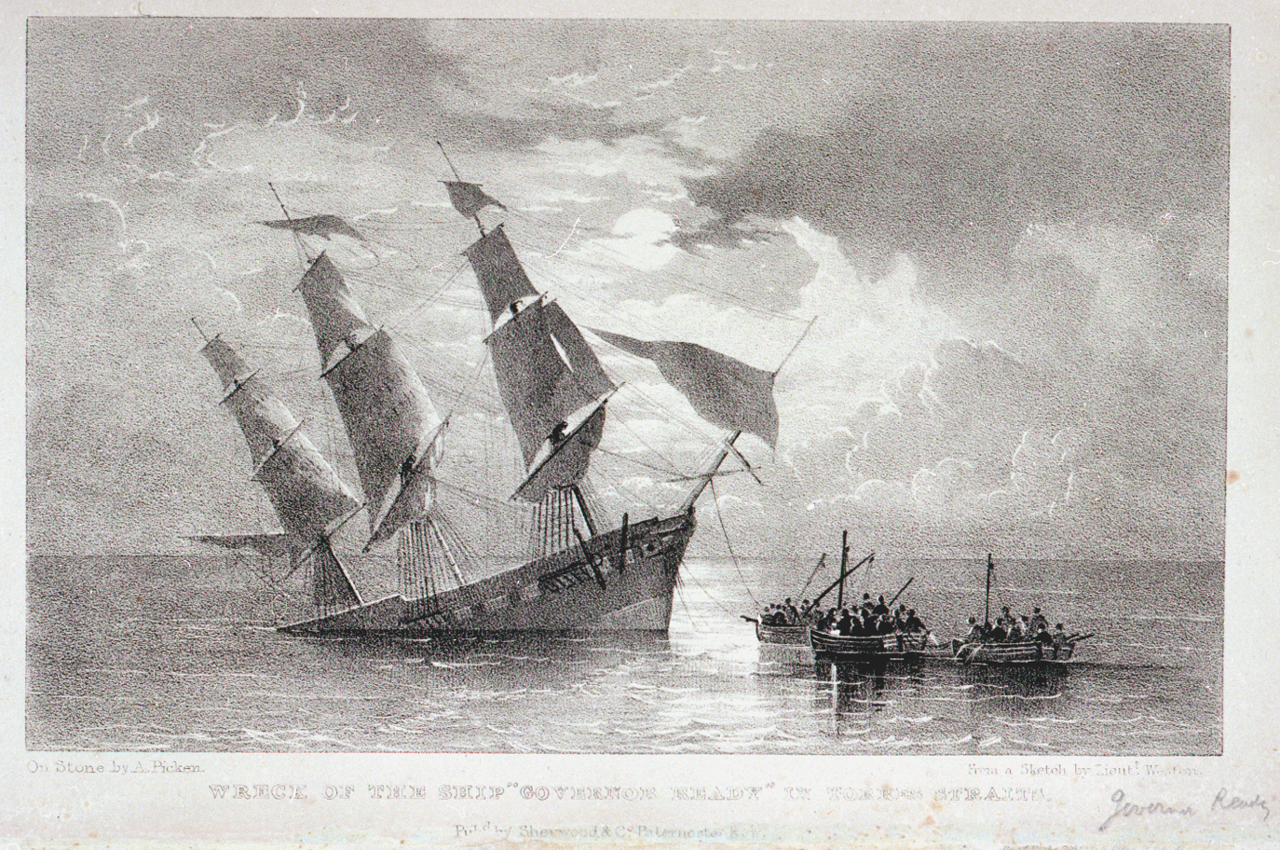
- The wreck of Governor Ready

History

United Kingdom
- Name: Governor Ready
- Builder: Prince Edward Island
- Launched: 1825
- Fate: Wrecked in 1829

General characteristics
- Type: Barque
- Tons burthen: 512 (bm)
- Propulsion: Sail

Governor Ready was built at Prince Edward Island, Canada in 1825. She made two voyages transporting convicts from England and Ireland to Australia. She was wrecked in the Torres Strait in May 1829.

== Career ==
Governor Ready first appeared in Lloyd's Register (LR) in 1826. It showed her master as J.Young, her owner as Cambridge, and her trade as Bristol–Quebec.

Under the command of John Young and surgeon Thomas Wilson, she left Plymouth, England on 3 April 1827 with 131 male convicts, passengers and cargo. She arrived at Hobart Town on 31 July 1827. One male convict died on the voyage.

Governor Ready sailed from Hobart with passengers, cargo and arrived at Sydney on 1 September 1827. She left Port Jackson on 29 September bound for Isle de France.

On her second convict voyage under the command of John Young and surgeon Thomas Wilson, she left Cork, Ireland on 21 September 1828 with 200 male convicts, passengers and cargo. She arrived at Sydney on 16 January 1829. No convicts died on the voyage.

Governor Ready left Port Jackson on 18 Match in ballast with passengers for Hobart Town.

== Fate ==
Governor Ready left Hobart on 2 April 1829 bound for Batavia, via Sydney. On 18 May, at about 3:00pm, the vessel struck a small detached coral patch in the Torres Strait between Murray and Halfway Islands and she immediately filled with water. The captain and crew abandoned the vessel and made for Timor, where they arrived after 14 days at sea. On their way they discovered the Duncan Islands in the central straits.
