= SS Seiko Maru =

A number of steamships have been named Seiko Maru, including:

- SS Seiko Maru (1890), 137 GRT
- SS Seiko Maru (1898), 108 GRT
- SS Seiko Maru (1909), 3,099 GRT
- SS Seiko Maru (1917), 371 GRT
- SS Seiko Maru (1935), 240 GRT
- SS Seiko Maru (1938), 164 GRT
- SS Seiko Maru (1940), 5,385 GRT
