= Belle Vue Islands =

Coordinates: 9°56′30″S 142°10′17″E

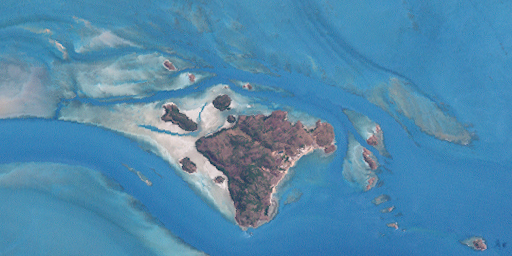
Landsat image of the Bellevue Islands

The Belle Vue Islands are a group of islands within the Torres Strait Islands, Queensland, Australia.

They include:

- Aipus Island
- Arden Island
- Cap Islet
- Florence Island
- Iadi Island
- Kamutnab Islet
- Kaub Islets
- Kongan Rock
- Mabuiag Island, the only inhabited island in the group
- Marte Island
- Mipa Islet
- North Island
- Passage Island
- Pelican Islet
- Puigulag Islet
- Pulu Islet
- Pururai Islet
- Red Fruit Island
- Scott Island
- Subur Islet
- Warakuikul Talab Island
- Widul Island

== See also ==
- List of Torres Strait Islands
