= Beanley Island =

Island in Queensland, Australia

- Interactive map of Beanley Island

Geography
- Location: Northern Australia
- Coordinates: 14.432°S 144.886°E
- Area: 0.07 km^{2} (0.027 sq mi)

Administration
- Australia
- State: Queensland

Beanley Island is part of the Great Barrier Reef Marine Park in the Howick Group National Park and is about 100 km south-east of Cape Melville in the Australian state of Queensland. It is around 7 hectares or 0.07 square km in size. This island is north-west of Howick Island.
