= Hampton Island =

Island in Queensland, Australia

- Interactive map of Hampton Island

Geography
- Location: Northern Australia
- Coordinates: 14.561°S 144.887°E
- Area: 0.28 km^{2} (0.11 sq mi)

Administration
- Australia
- State: Queensland

Additional information
- Time zone: AEST (Australian Eastern Standard Time)

Hampton Island is part of the Great Barrier Reef Marine Park and the southernmost island in the Cole Islands group and National Park and is about 100 km south-east of Cape Melville, Queensland. It is around 28 hectares or 0.28 square km in size.
