= Reef HQ =

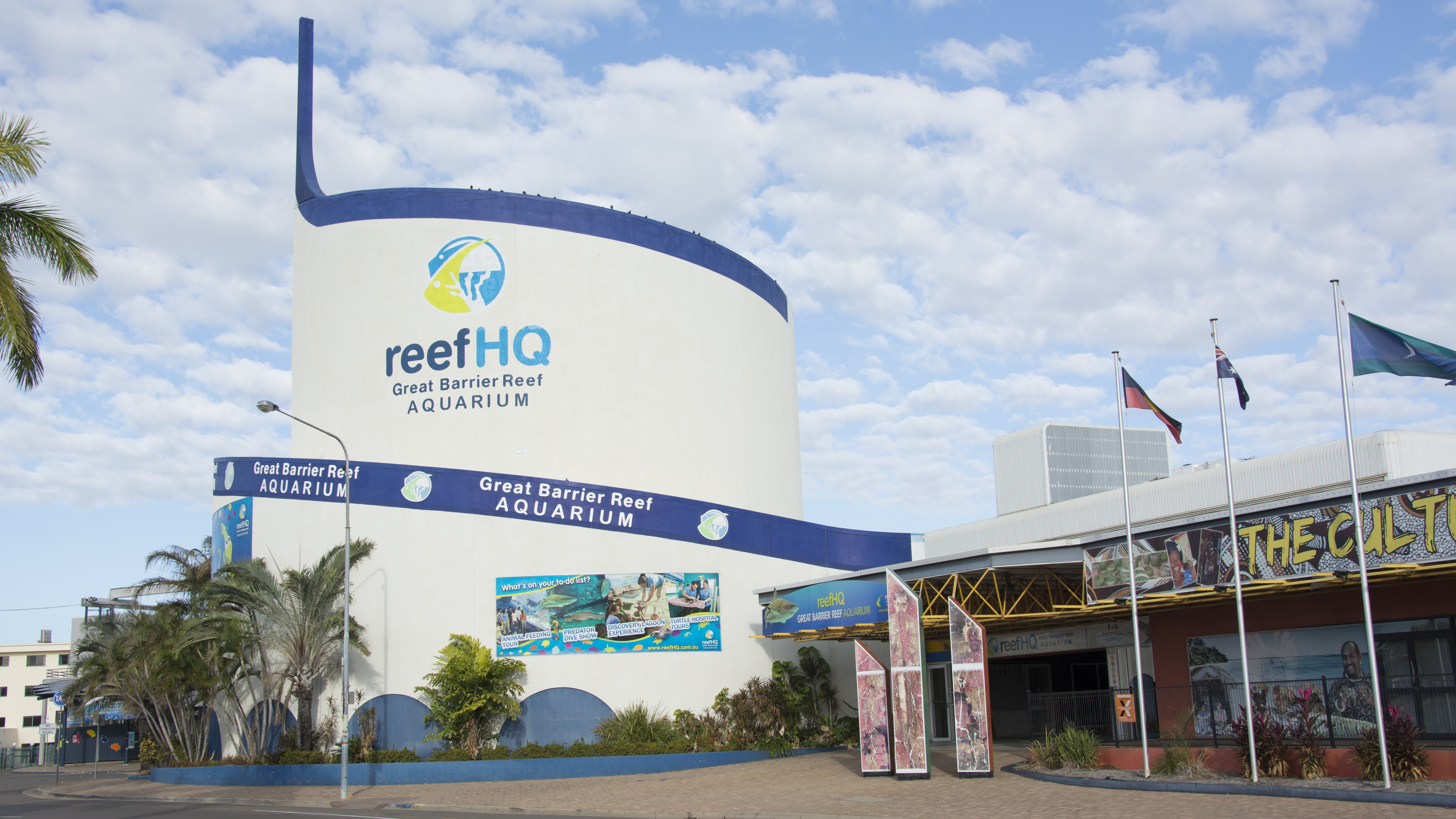
- Reef HQ main entrance, 2015
- Interactive map of Reef HQ
- 19.2577°S 146.8238°E
- Date opened: 14 June 1987; 39 years ago
- Date closed: 2021 (demolition of the existing aquarium scheduled for late 2026 before construction begins to deliver a new aquarium by 2029)
- Location: Townsville, Queensland, Australia
- Volume of largest tank: 2,600,000 L (up to 3 million lt after water intake)
- Annual visitors: 100,000
- Owner: Great Barrier Reef Marine Park Authority
- Website: www.reefhq.com.au

Reef HQ (also known ReefHQ or Great Barrier Reef Aquarium) was the world's largest living coral reef aquarium located in Townsville, Queensland, Australia. The aquarium was built as a Bicentennial Commemorative project and was a part of the Great Barrier Reef Marine Park Authority (GBRMPA). The Coral Reef Exhibit had 130 coral species and 120 fish species along with hundreds of species of sea stars, sea urchins, sea cucumbers, brittle stars, feather stars, snails, worms and sponges. The aquarium also included a turtle hospital which rehabilitates sea turtles for release back into the wild.

Reef HQ closed in 2021, with demolition of the existing aquarium scheduled for late 2026 before construction begins to deliver a new aquarium by 2029.

== History ==
Reef HQ was originally the vision of Dr Graeme Kelleher, a former chairman of the Great Barrier Reef Marine Park Authority (GBRMPA). Dr Kelleher's primary objective was to bring the marine environment onto the land and make it easily accessible to the public whilst also encouraging the public to help protect the reef.

Reef HQ was originally known as Great Barrier Reef Aquarium when it opened on 14 June 1987. The aquarium was renamed "Reef HQ" in 1999. In 2009, the name of the aquarium was changed to reflect its original name.

The turtle hospital opened on 24 August 2009, which was partially funded by over $60,000 of community donations. It was the first hospital in north Queensland specifically for turtle rehabilitation and this has provided significant educational opportunities for veterinary and marine science students, notably those from James Cook University.

In 2021, Reef HQ closed for refurbishment, but after a detailed inspection it was decided to demolish it entirely and build a new aquarium at the site. Most of the aquarium's inhabitants were rehomed at other public aquariums and facilities.

In January 2026, demolition of the existing aquarium was slated to begin in late 2026 before construction begins to deliver a new aquarium by 2029.

== Description ==
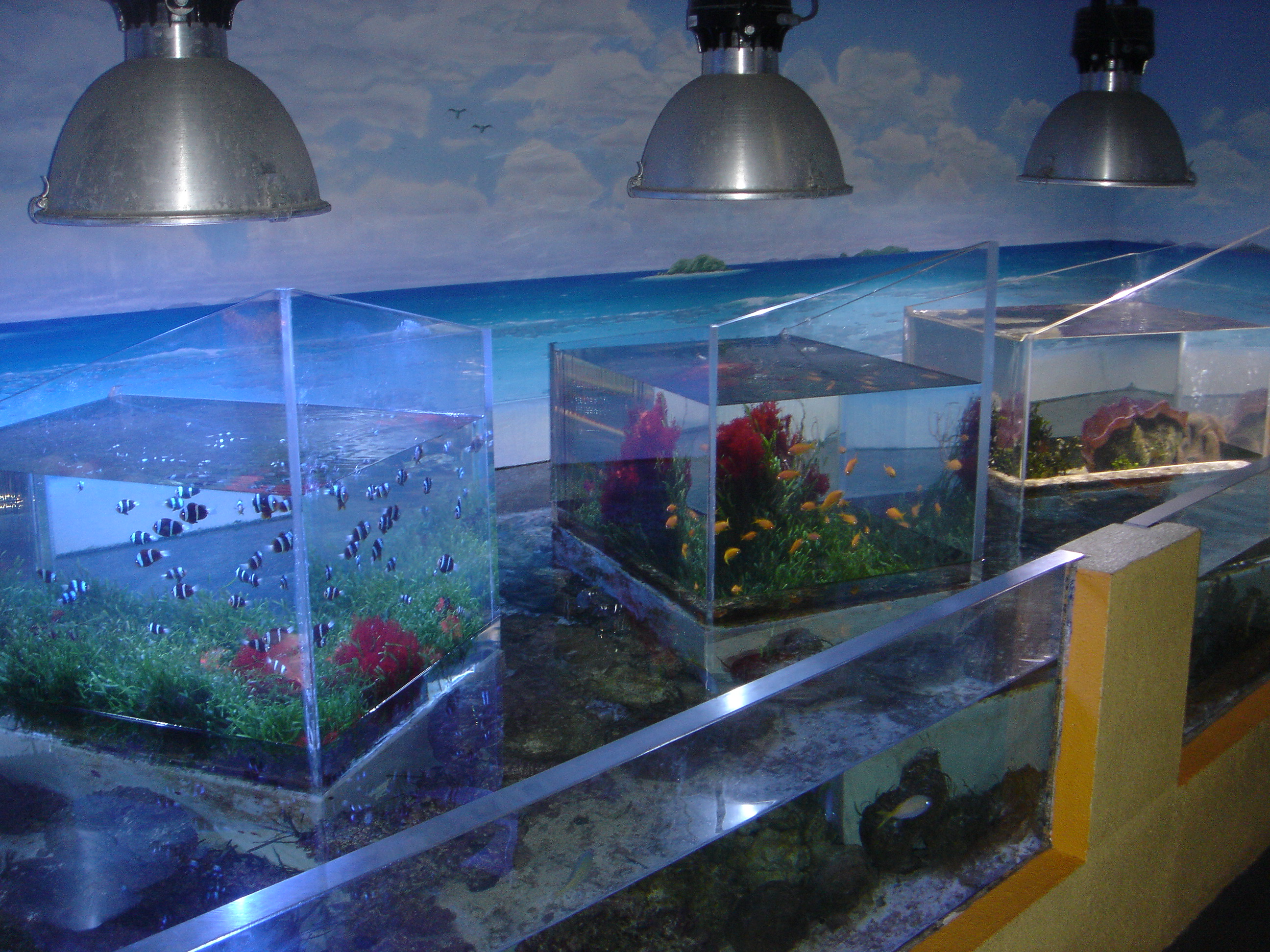
Three of a series of five tropical aquariums mounted in a single large room aquarium, located at the entrance of Reef HQ

Reef HQ included the Coral Reef Exhibit, a Predator Exhibit, a children's section, a gift shop and cafe. In 2006, Reef HQ opened new 'Exploring our Wetlands' interactive kiosks developed by the Great Barrier Reef Marine Park Authority.

=== Location ===
Reef HQ was located in the same complex as the Museum of Tropical Queensland and the Townsville Aboriginal and Torres Strait Islander Cultural Centre and an IMAX theatre in the Central Business District. Over 110,000 visitors toured Reef HQ every year.

=== Coral Reef Exhibit ===
Water motion was created in the Coral Reef Exhibit by a pneumatic wave machine. Unusually, the aquarium was open to the weather, receiving precipitation, sun- and moonlight, just like natural coral reefs. The tank held approximately 2.5 million litres of water.

== See also ==
- Great Barrier Reef Marine Park
