= Turnagain Island (Queensland) =

Island in Queensland, Australia

Turnagain
Buru Island
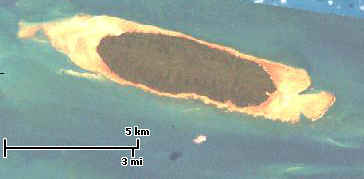
- A Landsat image of Turnagain Island

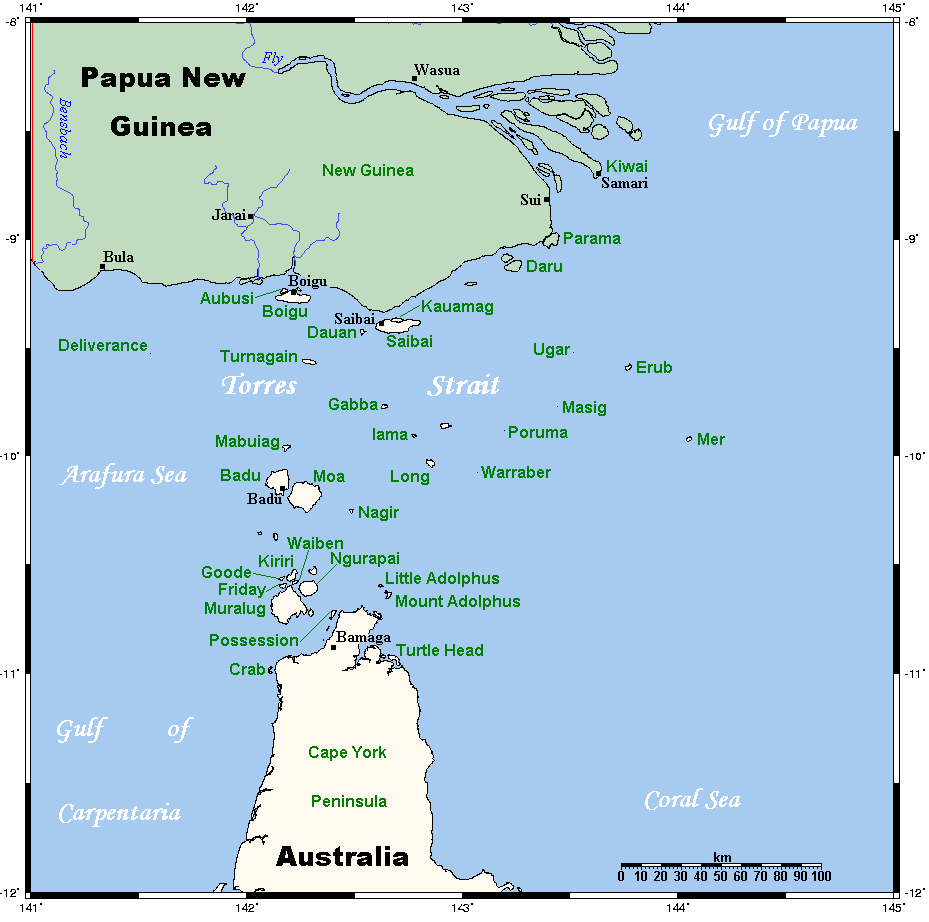
- A map of the Torres Strait Islands showing Turnagain in the northern central waters of Torres Strait

Geography
- Location: Northern Australia
- Coordinates: 9°34′01″S 142°16′59″E
- Archipelago: Torres Strait Islands
- Adjacent to: Torres Strait
- Area: 11.98 km^{2} (4.63 sq mi)
- Length: 7.5 km (4.66 mi)
- Width: 2.2 km (1.37 mi)

Administration
- Australia
- State: Queensland
- Local government area: Torres Strait Island Region

Turnagain, also called Buru Island, is an island of the Western Islands region of the Torres Strait Islands archipelago, located in the northern section of Torres Strait, Queensland, Australia. Turnagain is located within the Torres Strait Island Region Local government area.

== Geography ==
The island is located approximately 38 kilometres (24 mi) south of the Western Province of Papua New Guinea. Turnagain is 7.5 kilometres (4.7 mi) in length and up to 2.2 kilometres (1.4 mi) wide. Its area of 11.98 square kilometres (4.63 sq mi) is heavily wooded. It is uninhabited and is the shape of an elongated teardrop.

== See also ==
- List of Torres Strait Islands
