= Bewick Island =

Island in Queensland, Australia

- Interactive map of Bewick Island

Geography
- Location: Northern Australia
- Coordinates: 14.432°S 144.812°E
- Area: 1.3 km^{2} (0.50 sq mi)

Administration
- Australia
- State: Queensland

Bewick Island is part of the Great Barrier Reef Marine Park in the Howick Group National Park and is about 100 km south-east of Cape Melville, Queensland. It is around 130 hectares or 1.3 square km in size.

The island is north-west of Howick Island and home to sea turtles and sea pigeons.

== Maritime collision ==
About 0134 on 20 June 1985 the Australian registered bulk carrier River Boyne of 51,994 gross tons, on passage from Weipa to Gladstone with a cargo of bauxite, collided with the Australian registered fishing vessel Babirusa, on passage from Cairns to the Gulf of Carpentaria, in approximate position 1 4 ' 18'S, 114° 39'E. There was no injury to any person and the only damage sustained was to the starboard outrigger boom and the sternlight on the Babirusa.

Having established that the Babirusa required no assistance, the River Boyne continued its voyage to Gladstone. The Babirusa returned to Cairns for repairs.
