= Guijar Islet, Queensland =

Guijar Islet
- Suburb
- Interactive map of Guijar Islet
- Coordinates: 10.2547°S 142.8305°E
- Country: Australia
- State: Queensland
- LGA: Torres Strait Island Region
- Location: 5.2 km (3.2 mi) S of Sue Islet; 76 km (47 mi) NE of Thursday Island; 803 km (499 mi) NNW of Cairns; 2,185 km (1,358 mi) NNW of Brisbane

Government
  - State electorate: Cook
  - Federal division: Leichhardt

Area
  - Total: 0.1 km^{2} (0.039 sq mi)

Population
  - Total: 0 (2021 census)
  - Density: 0/km^{2} (0/sq mi)
- Time zone: UTC+10:00 (AEST)
- Postcode: 4875
Suburbs around Guijar Islet
Torres Strait	Sue Islet	Coral Sea
Torres Strait	Guijar Islet	Coral Sea
Torres Strait	Coral Sea	Coral Sea

Guijar Islet is an island locality in the Torres Strait Island Region, Queensland, Australia. It consists solely of Poll Island (also known as Guijar Islet). In the 2021 census, Guijar Islet had "no people or a very low population".

Guijar Islet's postcode is 4875.

== Demographics ==
In the 2016 census, Guijar Islet had "no people or a very low population".

In the 2021 census, Guijar Islet had "no people or a very low population".

== Education ==
There are no schools on Guijar Islet nor nearby.
