= Nob Island =

Island of Queensland, Australia

- Interactive map of Nob Island

Geography
- Location: Northern Australia
- Coordinates: 11.950°S 143.267°E
- Area: 0.01 km^{2} (0.0039 sq mi)

Administration
- Australia
- State: Queensland

Nob Island is an island about 1 km east of Cape Grenville in the Great Barrier Reef Marine Park in Queensland, Australia, in Temple Bay about 200 km north-east of Kutini-Payamu National Park and Lockhart River on Cape York Peninsula. It is around 1 hectare or 0.01 square km in size.

This island is part of the Home Islands.
