= HMAS Mallina =

3,213 GRT cargo ship

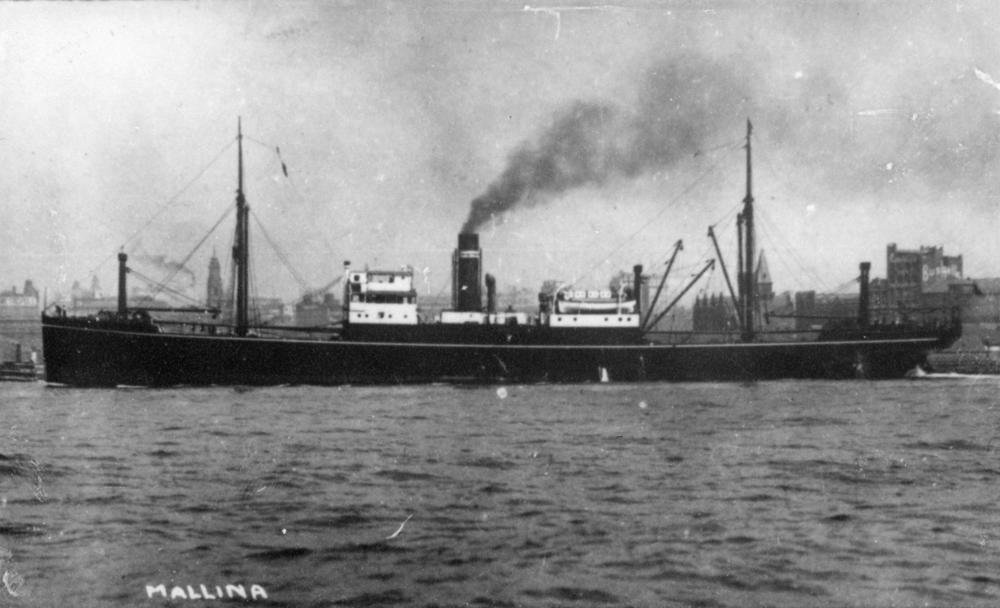
- SS Mallina

History
- Name: Mallina (1909–29); Seiko Maru (1929–35); Siberia Maru No. 3 (1935–37); Siberia Maru (1937–44)
- Owner: Australian United Steam Navigation Company, (1909-1914, 1915–1929); Royal Australian Navy (1914–15); Machida Shokai K.K. (1929–34); Kita Nippon Kisen K.K. (1934–40); Nipponkai Kisen K.K. (1940–41); Imperial Japanese Army (1941–44)
- Port of registry: (United Kingdom of Great Britain and Ireland) Brisbane (1909–14); (United Kingdom of Great Britain and Ireland) Royal Australian Navy (1914–15); (United Kingdom of Great Britain and Ireland) Brisbane (1915–29); (Empire of Japan) Kobe (1929–40); (Empire of Japan) Tokyo (1940–41); (Empire of Japan) Imperial Japanese Army (1941–44)
- Builder: Harland & Wolff, Belfast
- Cost: £70,000
- Yard number: 407
- Launched: 25 March 1909
- Completed: 29 April 1909
- Maiden voyage: 30 April 1909
- Identification: United Kingdom Official Number 115622 (1909–29); Japanese Official Number 34428 (1929–44); Code Letters TSGF (1929–34); Code Letters JDPC (1934–44)
- Fate: Sunk 24 September 1944

General characteristics
- Tonnage: 3,213 GRT, 1,625 NRT (1909–34); 3,099 GRT, 1,629 NRT (1934–44)
- Length: 330.5 ft (100.74 m)
- Beam: 44.3 ft (13.50 m)
- Draught: 26.1 ft (7.96 m)
- Depth: 23.3 ft (7.10 m)
- Installed power: Quadruple expansion steam engine, 643 nhp
- Propulsion: Screw propeller
- Speed: 13.5 knots (25.0 km/h) (service), 16.5 knots (30.6 km/h) (maximum)
- Complement: 37 (Mallina, 1909); 86 (Siberia Maru, 1944)

HMAS Mallina was a 3,213 GRT cargo ship built by Harland & Wolff, Belfast in 1909 as Mallina for the Australian United Steam Navigation Company for the Rockhampton to Sydney cargo route. She was requisitioned by the Royal Australian Navy in 1914, as a store carrier and collier. She was returned to her owners in 1915. She was sold in 1935 to Machida Shokai Kisen Kaisha, Japan and renamed Seiko Maru, before being sold to Kita Nippon Kisen Kaisha and renamed Siberia Maru No. 3, which was later shortened to Siberian Maru. While steaming in the Sulu Sea, Philippines on 24 September 1944, she was attacked by American aircraft of Task Force 38 and sunk with the loss of 158 of the 2,382 people on board.

== Description ==
Mallina was 330.5 feet (100.74 m) long, with a beam of 44.3 feet (13.50 m). She had a depth of 23.3 feet (7.10 m) and a draught of 26.1 feet (7.96 m). She was powered by a quadruple expansion steam engine, which had cylinders of 24½ inches (62 cm), 35 inches (89 cm), 50 inches (130 cm) and 75 inches (190 cm) diameter by 54 inches (140 cm) stroke. The engine was built by Harland & Wolff, Belfast. It drove a single screw propeller, and could propel her at 13.5 knots (25.0 km/h), although 16.5 knots (30.6 km/h) was achieved during her sea trials. In 1909, she had a complement of 37.

== History ==
Mallina was built as yard number 407 in 1908–09 by Harland and Wolff, Belfast for the Australian United Steam Navigation Company at a cost of £70,000. She was launched from slip 6 on 25 March 1909. Mallina was completed on 29 April. Mallina was allocated the United Kingdom Official Number 115622.

Mallina departed from Belfast on 30 April for her maiden voyage, which was for delivery to her owners. On 20 June, Mallina ran aground off Haggerston Island, Queensland due to her pilot mistaking Clerke Island for Nob Island. She was refloated later that day. Following an enquiry into the grounding by the Queensland Marine Board, the pilot was cautioned. Entering service on 13 July 1909, she was employed on the Rockhampton–Sydney route. At the time, she was the longest vessel serving Rockhampton. On 25 January 1910, Mallina was in collision with Lady Norman and the coal hulk Maida in the Brisbane River at Brisbane. Lady Norman was forced against Lady Musgrove and Maida was forced against Chillagoe.

Mallina was requisitioned by the Royal Australian Navy in May 1914 for use as a store carrier and collier. She was commissioned in August as HMAS Mallina. She participated during the Australian Naval and Military Expeditionary Force occupation of German New Guinea and later in concert with HMAS Australia in its search for Vizeadmiral Maximilian von Spee's German squadron in the Pacific Ocean. She also supplied Royal Navy vessels patrolling off Central America. In February 1915, HMAS Mallina was decommissioned and returned to the Australian United Steam Navigation Company. On 11 May 1921, a sailor on Mallina fell through an open hatchway on the ship to his death. Her captain was fined A£15 for not having watchmen on duty guarding the open hatchway. On 13 December 1928, Mallina ran aground in the Brisbane River near the Victoria Bridge, Brisbane.

In July 1929, Mallina was sold to the Machida Shokai K.K. and was renamed Seiko Maru. The Japanese Official Number 34428 and Code Letters TSGF were allocated. Her port of registry was Kobe. In 1934, her Code Letters were changed to JDPC. On 31 October 1934, she was sold to Kita Nippon Kisen K.K. and was converted to a cargo liner. She was now assessed at 3,099 GRT, 1,629 NRT. On 8 April 1935, she was renamed Siberia Maru No. 3. Her name had been shortened to Siberia Maru by 1937. On She served on the Tsuruga–Vladivostok route until 1939, then the Niigata–Seishin–Rashin route. On 30 January 1940. Siberia Maru was sold to the Nipponkai Kisen K.K. Her port of registry was changed to Tokyo.

In November 1941, Siberia Maru was requisitioned by the Imperial Japanese Army. She was later converted to a byōinsen (hospital ship). Official notification of her status as a hospital ship was given on 29 October 1942. She also served as a troopship. An example of this use is that she departed from Ujina for Qinhuangdao on 18 December 1942, carrying troops of the 55th Independent Engineer Battalion. In 1944, she was reclassified as a transport ship.

== Fate ==
On 20 September 1944, Siberia Maru departed from Manila for Negros, Philippines as a member of Convoy C-203. There were 2,382 people on board, comprising 86 crew, 26 guards and lookouts and 2,270 troops and air force personnel. Other vessels in the convoy were Koshu Maru No. 2, with escort by the auxiliary submarine chasers CHa-39 and CHa-42. The convoy sheltered in Loc Bay, off Masbate on 21 September to avoid an American task force. The next day, the convoy was joined by the Imperial Japanese Navy supply ship Shinyo Maru and minesweeper Wa-7. On 24 September, the convoy departed from Loc Bay for Negros. The convoy was north west of Pulanduta Point, Masbate when it was attacked by 23 aircraft of Task Force 38. Siberia Maru was bombed and set afire. She sank at 11°54′56″N 123°10′08″E with the loss of 158 lives. The wreck was salvaged by USS Chanticleer between 28 June and 14 July 1945.

== Sources ==
- Wilson, Michael; Royal Australian Navy 21st Century Warships, Naval auxiliaries 1911 to 1999 including Defence Maritime Services, Profile No. 4 - Revised Edition, Topmill Pty Ltd, Marrickville. ISBN 978-1-876270-72-8
