= Tourism on the Great Barrier Reef =

Service industry in Australia involving recreational diving

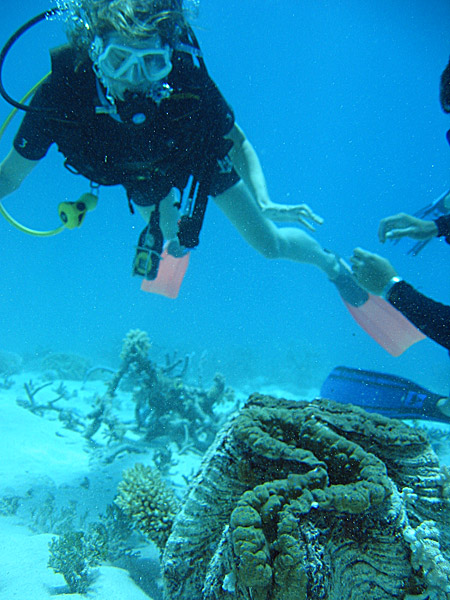
A scuba diver looking at a giant clam on the Great Barrier Reef

Tourism is one of the major industries in the Great Barrier Reef region. Approximately 2.19 million people visit the Great Barrier Reef each year. According to the WWF, tourism of the area contributes $6.4 billion a year to the Australian economy, and employs approximately 69,000 people. Biologist Ove Hoegh-Guldberg believes that the Great Barrier Reef's key competitive advantage over other nearby reef tourism destinations is its reputation as "the most pristine coral reef on the planet". The Great Barrier Reef Marine Park Authority states that careful management, which includes permits for camping and all commercial marine tourism within the Great Barrier Reef Marine Park, ensures that tourists have minimal impact on the reef. However, rising incidences of widespread coral bleaching, coastal development, and tourism have taken a toll the biodiversity of the reef.

== History ==
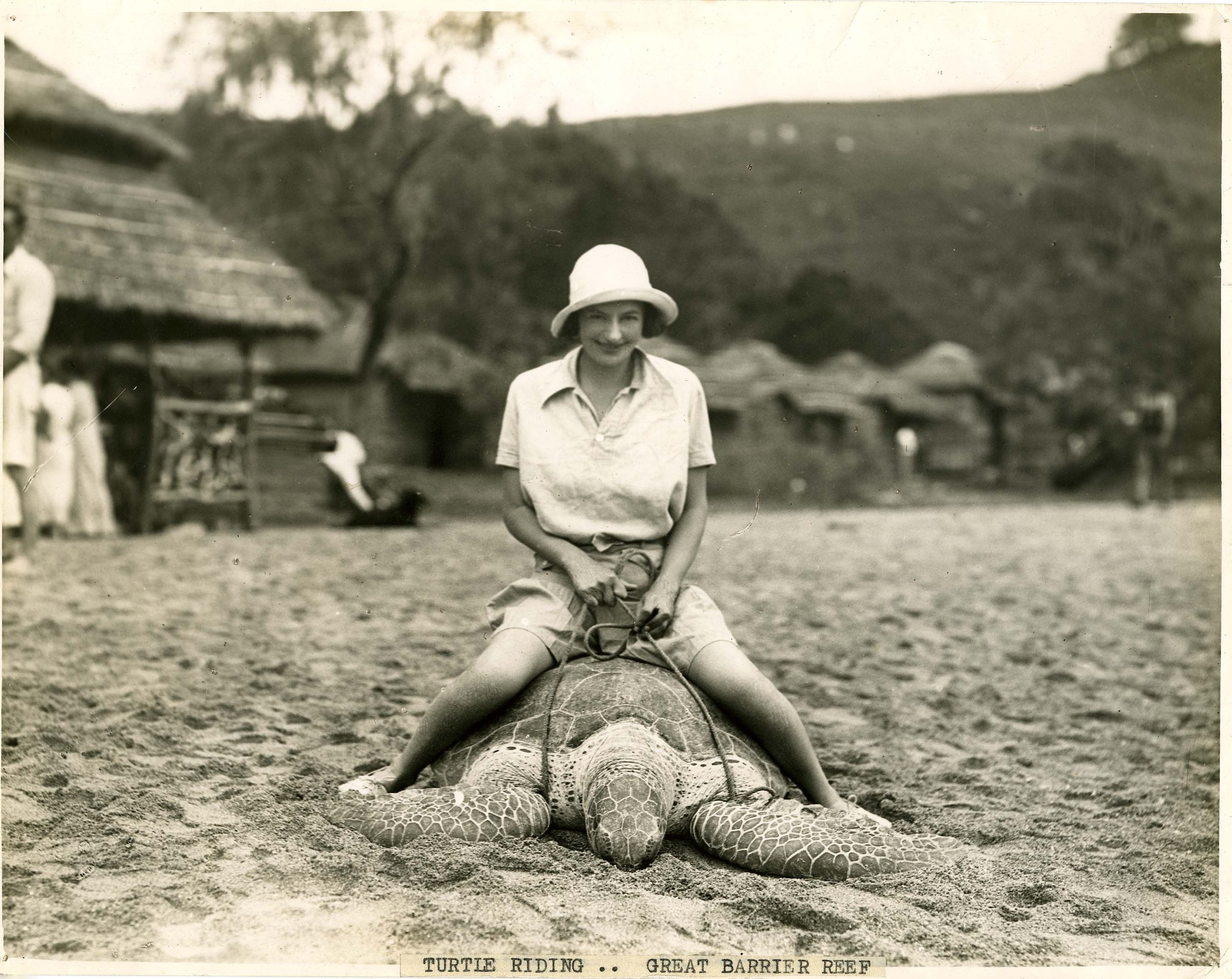
Turtle riding was a popular tourist activity in the 1920s and 1930s.

The earliest known tourism in the region took place on Green Island in the 1890s. In the early 20th century, scientific field expeditions became popular in the region, which laid the groundwork for tourism. Visiting Aboriginals was briefly popular among tourists, but missionaries eventually discouraged it.

Torres Strait Islanders relocated south to the Whitsundays where they demonstrated turtle hunting, sand and danced for tourists. In 1931, The Morning Bulletin called for increased tourism in the area, extolling the game fish that could be caught in the region. However, during World War II, tourism largely stopped.

During the 1960s and 1970s, tourism was popular once again. Tansportation improved and local residents began to offer extended day trips by boat, cruising at between 15 and 20 nautical miles. The remoteness of several parts of the Great Barrier Reef naturally prevented access and human impact on certain areas.

In 1981, the Great Barrier Reef was inscribed on the world heritage list. Tourism is regarded to be an important way that Australia can fulfill its duty to present the Great Barrier Reef in accordance with the world heritage convention. In the 1980s, tourism in the Great Barrier Reef region expanded rapidly. At one point during the 1980s, a floating hotel operated. As of 1987, 450,000 tourists visited. Skeat and Skeat attribute the growth in tourist numbers during the 1980s to improved air access to regional areas, including the Cairns International Airport, and large catamarans which allowed day trips of 50 nautical miles. During the 1980s, there was concern that tourism was harming the reef. The disappearance of Tom and Eileen Lonergan in 1998 while scuba diving off the Great Barrier Reef caused the Queensland government to commission a task force to review the workplace health and safety standards of recreational diving and snorkelling.

The 2008 financial crisis saw a reduction in both international travellers and business travellers, with the later group declining by 9% in 2009 compared to the previous year. After the 2010–2011 Queensland floods many travellers cancelled trips to the state, resulting in a loss of hundreds of millions of dollars.

The Reserve Bank deputy governor Philip Lowe stated in February 2012 that tourism in Australia is having undergo structural changes because of a contraction in the sector due to the impact of a high Australian dollar. By 2012, the estimated value of tourism in the Great Barrier Reef region had reached $5.5 billion. In the wake of Cyclone Marcia, a marketing campaign urged people to visit the region to help it recover. In response to the coral bleaching event of 2016, where only 7% of the reef was unaffected, the tourism industry created a hashtag, #GBRtoday showing healthy corals. Also in 2016, the Australian government asked for a chapter on climate change and the Great Barrier Reef to be removed from UNESCO's report on the status of the Great Barrier Reef over concerns it could impact on tourism. Domestic tourism to the reef subsequently fell.

== Tourism ==
As of 2003, 85% of tourism in the region was concentrated in Cairns and the Whitsunday areas of the Marine Park. Vessel-based tourism operations can serve from 10 to over 400 people. Extended vessel-based tourism operations can last for weeks and move between different sites.

=== Safety and Diving ===
The disappearance of Tom and Eileen Lonergan in 1998 while scuba diving off the Great Barrier Reef caused the Queensland government to commission a task force to review the workplace health and safety standards of recreational diving and snorkelling. In 2003, Gabe Watson and his wife Tina were dive buddies on an expedition, despite Tina's inexperience. Tina drowned and Watson was subsequently convicted of manslaughter. In 2008, another two tourists were left behind, and had to tread water for 19 hours. In 2011, another tourist was left snorkelling and had to swim to another boat.

== Types of tourists ==
A survey conducted in 2003 found that visitors to the Whitsundays were likely to be first-time visitors to the Great Barrier Reef, had an average age of 37, were mainly international visitors, were likely to be visiting with a partner or their family, and were likely to have taken part in snorkelling, swimming, or taking part on a semi-submersible tour. A report in 1995 found that tourists expected to see beautiful islands and beaches, to experience a "natural, unspoilt environment", and to see a variety of fish and corals, and compare their experience with idealised tourist advertising. A report in 1999 found that older tourists participated in fewer activities at the Great Barrier Reef, and urged caution in considering them a lucrative market.

A 2003 paper discussed the patterns of repeat visitors to the GBR region. It found that they were younger, likely to be backpackers or interstate tourists, if they were international visitors they were likely to be from North America or Europe, more likely to go diving, and more likely to seek smaller, specialised operations for their return visit. A survey in 2015 found that two thirds of tourists wanted to see the Great Barrier Reef before it was gone.

With the threat of global warming and the recent major coral bleaching of parts of the reef many Australians are worried that tourism will face a downturn. According to the Australian Institute, 55 percent of Chinese respondents say they would be more likely to travel to another country all together, with 63 percent saying they would be more likely to travel to somewhere else in Australia. More than one third of Americans would be more likely to visit another country, with 42 percent more likely to go to other areas of Australia. UK visitors are least likely to choose another country, but more than a quarter of UK respondents would be less likely to visit Australia if bleaching continues.

=== Management and regulations of the Great Barrier Reef Marine Park ===
The Great Barrier Reef Marine Park Act 1975 is one of the major laws governing the management of the Great Barrier Reef Marine Park. When it was passed, the management of tourism was seen as an important issue. Ros Kelly proposed a 1% tax on tourism activities in the GBR in 1991, but this was criticised by Queensland's premier, Wayne Goss. All licensed tourism operations in the Marine Park must pay the Environmental Management Charge (EMC), introduced in 1993, which provided 18% of the Great Barrier Reef Marine Park Authority's budget in 2009–2010.

=== Impacts of man-made climate change on the Great Barrier Reef ===
Mass coral-bleaching events, reflective of regional periods of coral stress, have been documented by researchers since the 1980s. While these events were originally attributed to El Nino currents, studies have shown that coral bleaching in the Great Barrier Reef is the result of climate change. In 2002, an aerial survey of a mass coral-bleaching event conducted by Ray Berkelmans, Glen De'ath, Kininmonth, and Williams J. Skirving of the Australian Institute of Marine Science showed an increase in bleaching compared to a survey conducted on another mass coral bleaching event in 1998. The increase in coral bleaching was correlated with a rise in Sea Surface Temperature (SST).

=== Economic Contributions to the Australian Economy ===
The reef contributes $6.4 billion into the national economy, has added 64,000 jobs in 2015–16, and is estimated to be worth $56 billion in total economic, social, and icon asset value according to the Great Barrier Reef Foundation. That compares to more than 12 Sydney Opera Houses. This $56 billion asset is split into three groups of value: $29 billion is derived from Australians who visit the reef as tourists,$24 billion from Australians who have not visited the reef but value knowing that it exists, and $3 billion is derived from Australians who are recreational users of the Reef. The reef is critical to supporting economic activity and jobs in Australia as a whole. The livelihoods and businesses it support across Australia far exceeds the number supported by many other industries.

=== Impacts of tourism on the Great Barrier Reef ===
Coinciding with the presence of mass coral bleaching events was tourist development along Australia's coastline. "In the 1980s, the island resort of Hamilton was built following the dredging of harbors, leveling of hills, construction of hotels and an airport, and the creation of artificial beaches". The sediment produced by coastal tourist development has also shown to prevent coral in the Reef from photosynthesizing, causing parts of the Reef to be "starved."

Sunscreen is a useful product that many people (especially tourists) use to protect their skin against high amounts of UV. As these tourists protect their skin from burning by putting sunscreen on and running into the ocean, they are actually harming the Great Barrier Reef. Sunscreen and other skin products cause the reef to go into a process known as coral bleaching. “Sunscreens cause the rapid and complete bleaching of hard corals, even at extremely low concentrations. The effect of sunscreens is due to organic ultraviolet filters, which are able to induce the lytic viral cycle in symbiotic zooxanthellae with latent infections,”NCBI. In simple terms, the chemicals in sunscreen are absorbed into the coral and act like a poison, negatively impacting a reefs ability to reproduce and grow, resulting in bleaching. Coral bleaching is when the coral loses its pigment/vibrant colors and dies, leaving only a white or brown skeleton. Corals that have undergone bleaching are completely dead.

Tourists also cause physical damage to the Great Barrier Reef in several ways. Boats used to take tourists on snorkeling excursions are one of the main culprits. These boats scratch and break of pieces of the coral, not only causing death to the severed piece but also harming the rest of the reef. Tourists have also been known to deliberately break off pieces of the coral for souvenirs. Inexperienced snorkelers are likely to accidentally step on, trample and break the coral as they attempt to explore.

An increase in tourism leads to an increase of trash and waste. When littering and pollution occurs, this not only damages the Great Barrier Reef but the entire ecosystem. Pieces of trash have been known to get caught onto coral and eventually cause damage as it blocks it from the sun, thus preventing photosynthesis. The decreased quality of the water and limited access to sunlight leads to bleaching and death within the coral.

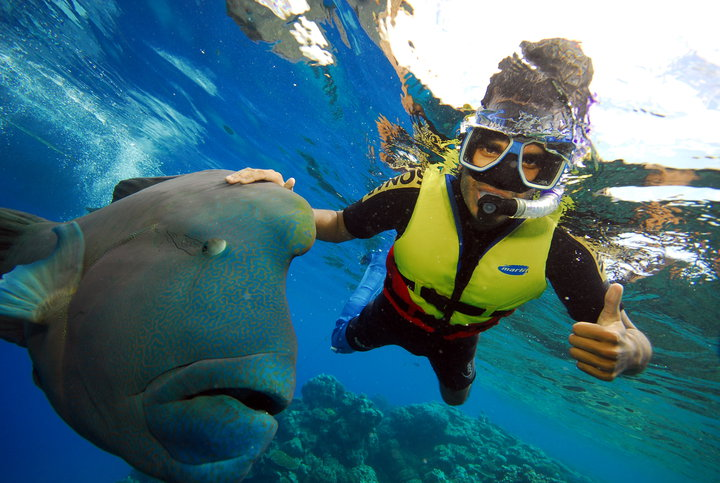
Snorkelling on the Great Barrier Reef, 2011

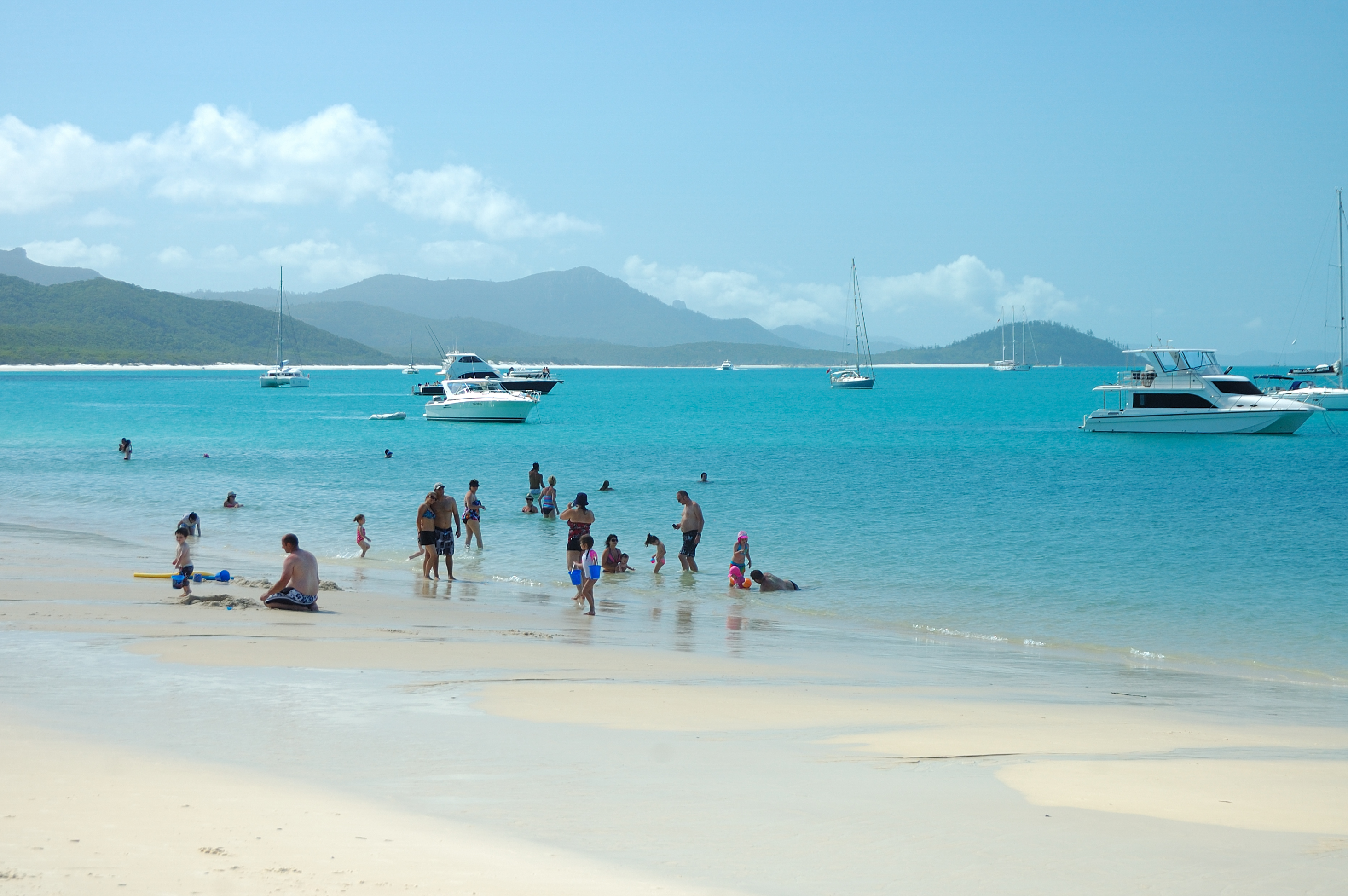
Australian beaches are world renowned.

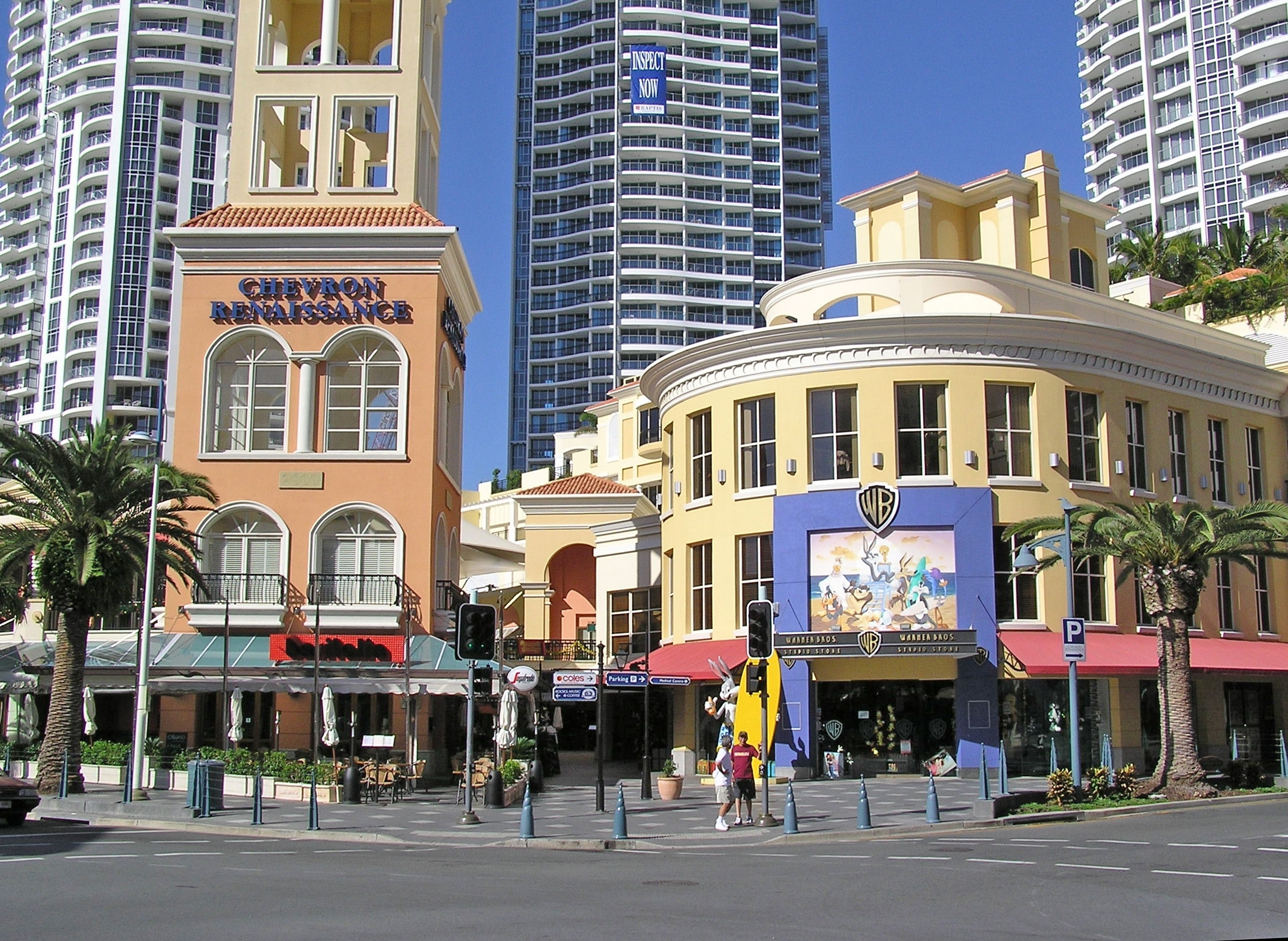
Gold Coast, Queensland, a popular holiday destination in Australia renowned for its beaches, laid back lifestyle, high rises and its locality near four major amusement parks.

== See also ==
- Tourism in Australia
- Environmental threats to the Great Barrier Reef
- Tourism Queensland
- Visa policy of Australia
