= The Three Sisters (Queensland) =

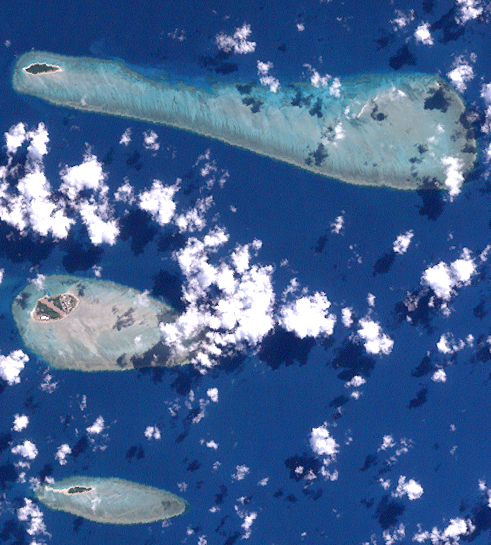
- Interactive map of The Three Sisters

Geography
- Coordinates: 10.200°S 142.833°E

Administration
- Australia
- State: Queensland
- Local government area: Torres Strait Island Region

The Three Sisters are three islands in the Vigilant Channel of the Torres Strait, Queensland, Australia. The islands are, from north to south, Bet Islet, Sue Islet and Poll Islet. The islands are within the Torres Strait Island Region local government area.

The islands are approximately 100 km (62 mi) north-east of Thursday Island.

== See also ==
- List of Torres Strait Islands
- List of islands of Australia
