= Duncan Islands =

Island group in the Torres Strait Islands archipelago

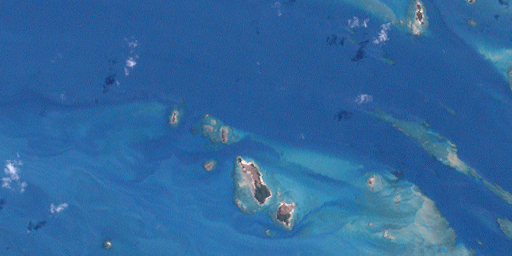
- A Landsat image of the Duncan Islands

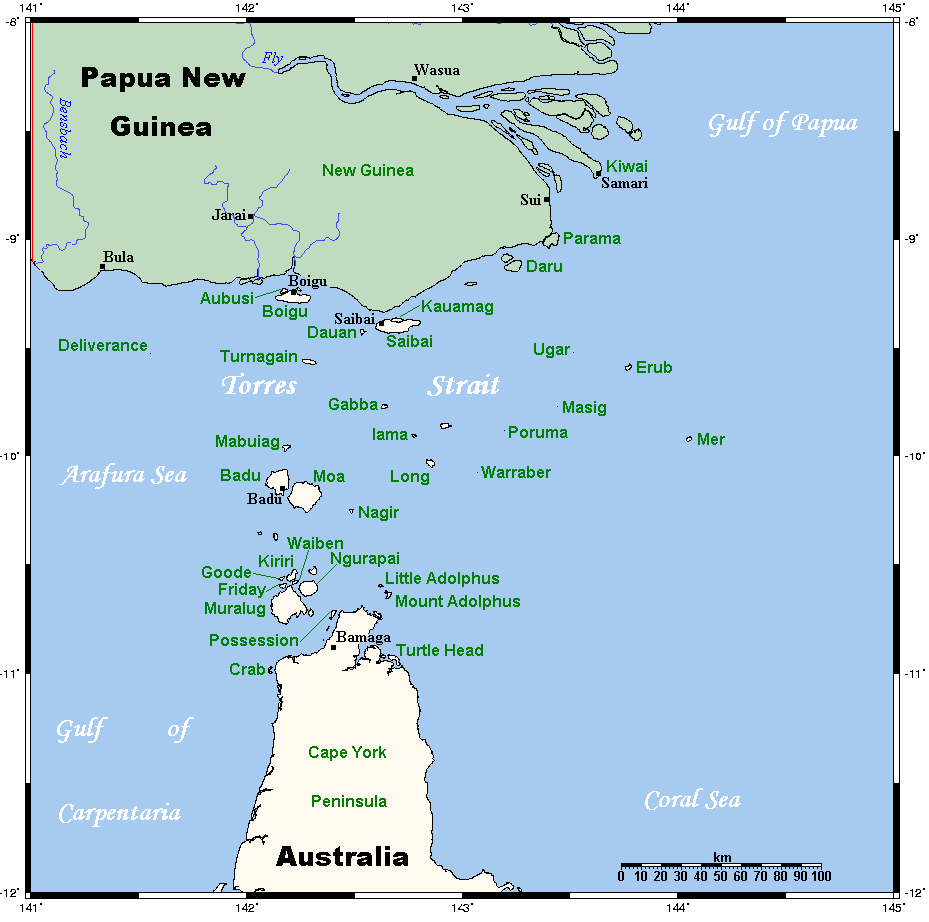
- A map of the Torres Strait Islands. The Duncan Islands are southwest of Badu Island, in the western central waters of Torres Strait, not located on the map.

Geography
- Location: Northern Australia
- Coordinates: 10°14′10″S 142°04′37″E
- Archipelago: Torres Strait Islands
- Adjacent to: Torres Strait
- Total islands: 3

Administration
- Australia
- State: Queensland
- Local government area: Torres Strait Island Region

Demographics
- Population: Uninhabited

The Duncan Islands are a group of islands in the Torres Strait Islands archipelago, northwest of the Bramble Channel of Torres Strait in Queensland, Australia. The islands are situated north of Thursday Island and approximately 15 kilometres (9.3 mi) southwest of Badu Island. The Duncan Islands are located within the Torres Strait Island Region local government area.

The Duncan Islands include three uninhabited islands:

- Kanig Island
- Maitak Island
- Meth Islet

The first Europeans to discover the islands were the survivors of the wreck of Governor Ready, who were sailing to Timor in their boats.

== See also ==
- List of Torres Strait Islands
