= Turtle Head Island =

Island in Queensland, Australia

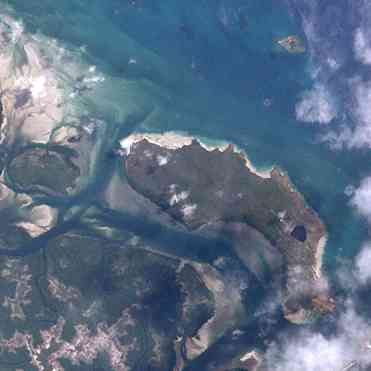
- Turtle Head Island (centre) with Turtle Island (top right) and Trochus Island (middle left).

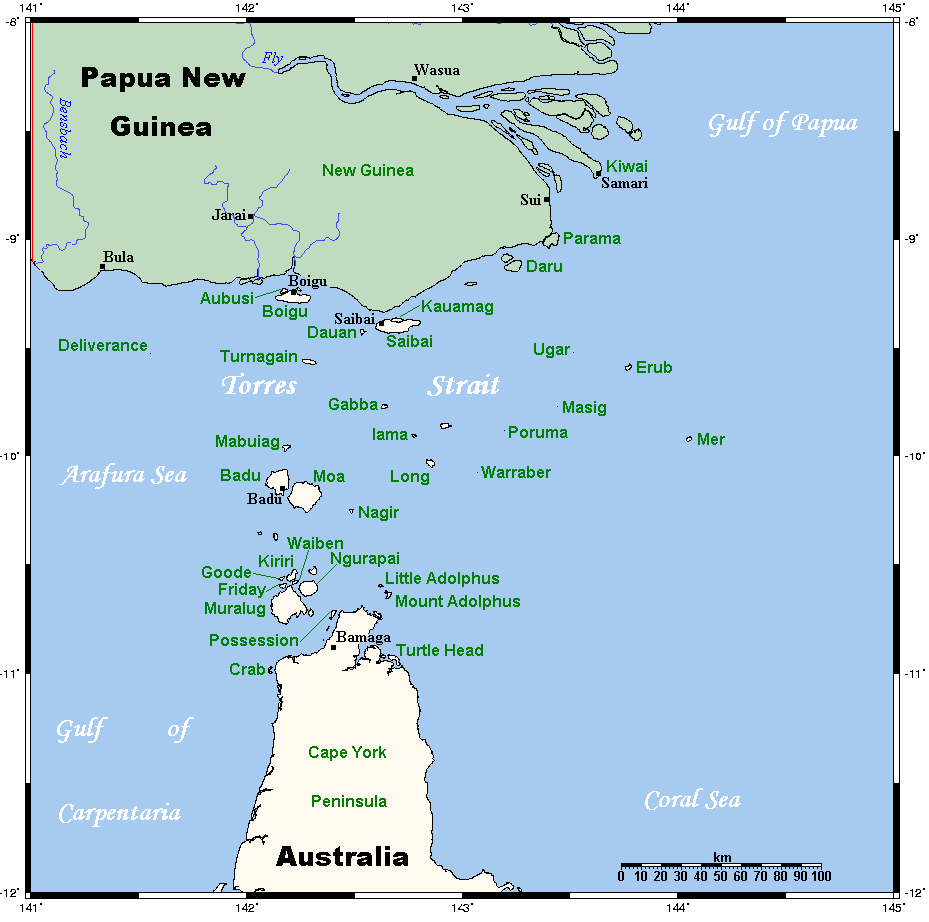
- A map of the Torres Strait Islands showing Turtle Head Island in the south eastern waters of Torres Strait, east of the Cape York Peninsula

Geography
- Location: Great Barrier Reef Marine Park, Northern Australia
- Coordinates: 10°55′48″S 142°40′48″E
- Archipelago: Torres Strait Islands
- Adjacent to: Torres Strait

Administration
- Australia
- State: Queensland
- Local government area: Shire of Torres

Demographics
- Ethnic groups: Torres Strait Islanders

Turtle Head Island is an island of the Torres Strait Islands archipelago, located in the Great Barrier Reef Marine Park, east of Cape York Peninsula, in Queensland, Australia.

The island is located in Newcastle Bay at the mouth of Escape River and Middle River, not far from Jackey Jackey Creek and adjacent to the Apudthama National Park. The island lies approximately 30 km (19 mi) southeast of Bamaga.

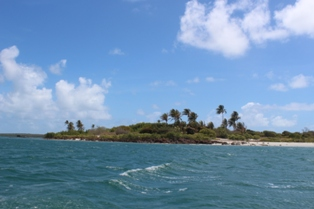
Turtle Head Island, Cape York

== History ==
In 1960, Kakuda Pearl, in a joint operation with Cape York Pearling (then Oceangem Pearling), built the Escape River pearl farm on Turtle Head Island.

In 2009, Rusty and Bronwyn Tully purchased the Escape River pearl farm—the second-oldest pearl farm in Australia and the largest in Queensland—and have lived there since moving from Thursday Island.

== See also ==
- List of Torres Strait Islands
