= Hannibal Islands =

Islands in Queensland

- Interactive map of Hannibal Islands

Geography
- Location: Northern Australia
- Coordinates: 11.592°S 142.943°E

Administration
- Australia
- State: Queensland

The Hannibal Islands are a group of small, sandy and coral islands in the Shelburne Bay in the far north of Queensland, Australia, about 21 miles from Cairncross Island, and 100 km north of Cape Grenville, Cape York Peninsula in the Great Barrier Reef Marine Park.

The islands are a part of the East Islands group about 10 km from Captain Billy Landing. The islands were named by Phillip Parker King in 1819 after his brother in law Hannibal Macarthur.
