= Clerke Island =

Island in Queensland, Australia

- Interactive map of Clerke Island

Geography
- Location: Northern Australia
- Coordinates: 11.971°S 143.288°E
- Area: 0.29 km^{2} (0.11 sq mi)

Administration
- Australia
- State: Queensland

Clerke Island is an island about 1 km East of Cape Grenville in the Great Barrier Reef Marine Park, Queensland, Australia, in Temple Bay about 200 km north-east of Kutini-Payamu National Park and Lockhart River on the Cape York Peninsula. It is around 29 hectares or 0.29 square km in size.

This island is part of Home Islands.

The nearest populous place is the village of Lockhart River which is 90 km (56 mi) away with a population of around 450.
