= Trochus Island =

Island in Queensland, Australia

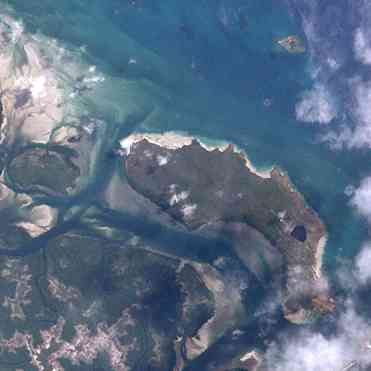
- Trochus Island (left) with Turtle Head Island (centre)

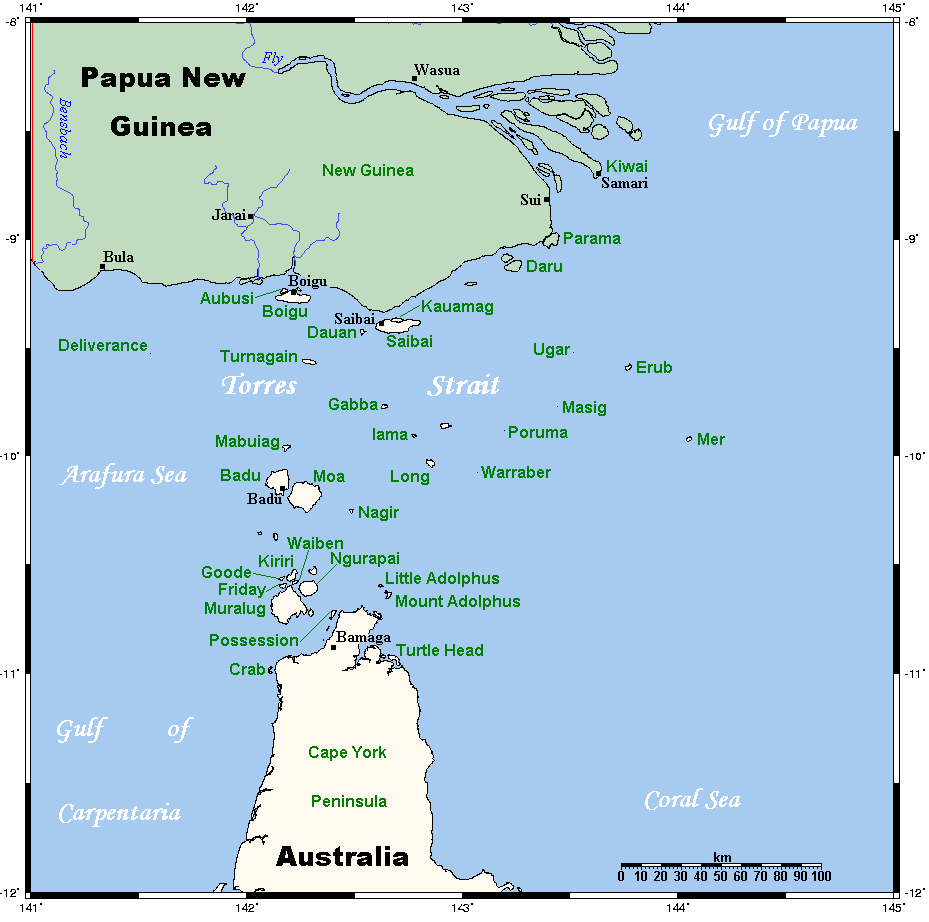
- A map of the Torres Strait Islands showing Turtle Head Island in the south eastern waters of Torres Strait, east of the Cape York Peninsula

Geography
- Location: Great Barrier Reef Marine Park, Northern Australia
- Coordinates: 10°55′19″S 142°37′48″E
- Archipelago: Torres Strait Islands
- Adjacent to: Torres Strait
- Area: 2.10 km^{2} (0.81 sq mi)

Administration
- Australia
- State: Queensland
- Local government area: Shire of Torres

Demographics
- Ethnic groups: Torres Strait Islanders

Trochus Island is an island of the Torres Strait Islands archipelago, located in the Great Barrier Reef Marine Park, east of Cape York Peninsula, in Queensland, Australia.

The island is located in Newcastle Bay at the mouth of Escape River and Middle River, not far from Jackey Jackey Creek and adjacent to the Apudthama National Park. The island lies approximately 30 km (19 mi) southeast of Bamaga and has an approximate area of 2.1 square kilometres (0.81 sq mi).

== Gallery ==
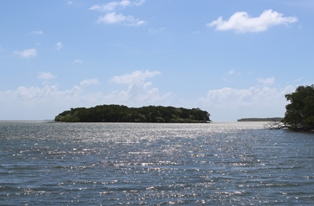

== See also ==
- List of Torres Strait Islands
