= Talbot Islands =

Island group in Queensland, Australia

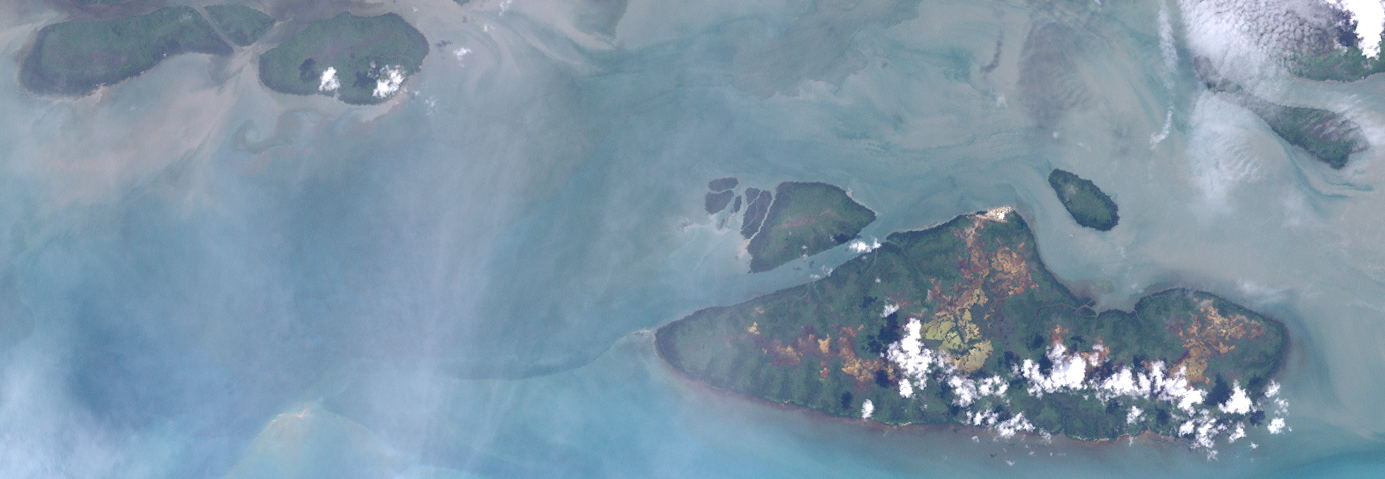
- Interactive map of Talbot Islands

Geography
- Location: Australia
- Coordinates: 9.267°S 142.217°E

Administration
- Australia

Talbot Islands are a group of Torres Strait Islands in Queensland, Australia. They lie between the Australian mainland and the island of New Guinea and a few kilometres west of Saibai Island, Torres Strait, only 4 km from the Papua New Guinea mainland at the mouth of the Mai Kussa (Baxter) River.

The Talbot Islands contain five named and about six smaller islands:

- Boigu Island
- Moimi Island
- Aubussi Island
- Moegina Kawa
- Aymermud

Only Boigu Island is inhabited. The town of Boigu is the northernmost settlement of Australia. Moimi Island, the northernmost island, is only four kilometres away from Kussa Island, which has been recognised part of New Guinea in the 1978 Torres Strait Treaty, but delineated as part of Australia on older maps. Kussa Island and tiny nearby Athian Maza and Yaperi (Vapere) islands, also at the mouth of the Mai Kussa River, are geographically part of the island group, as are the Kawai Islands (Kawa Island, Karobailo Kawa Island, Adabadana Kawa Island and Mata Kawa Island) nine kilometres further west/west-northwest close to the mouth of Wassi Kussa River, which have also been part of Papua New Guinea since the treaty of 1978.

Strachan Island is a large river island between the Wassi Kussa River and Mai Kussa River and borders the Torres Strait with its southern shore, but is not part of the Talbot or Torres Strait Islands. It is inhabited.

The Talbot Islands, along with Saibai and Dauan, are known as the Top Western islands of the Torres Strait Islands
