= Halfway Islet =

Island in Queensland, Australia

- Interactive map of Halfway Islet

Geography
- Location: Northern Australia
- Coordinates: 11.380°S 142.968°E

Administration
- Australia
- State: Queensland

Halfway Islet is a small island in the Boydong cays, Shelburne Bay in far north Queensland, Australia. It is about 100 km north of Cape Grenville, Cape York Peninsula in the Great Barrier Reef Marine Park Queensland, Australia.

It is a part of the East Islands group about 25 km northeast of Captain Billy Landing.
