= Burrar Islet, Queensland =

Burrar Islet
- Suburb
- Interactive map of Burrar Islet
- Coordinates: 10.1461°S 142.8208°E
- Country: Australia
- State: Queensland
- LGA: Torres Strait Island Region
- Location: 81.1 km (50.4 mi) NW of Thursday Island (straight line); 500 km (310 mi) NNW of Cairns (straight line); 2,180 km (1,350 mi) NNW of Brisbane (straight line)

Government
  - State electorate: Cook
  - Federal division: Leichhardt

Area
  - Total: 0.2 km^{2} (0.077 sq mi)

Population
  - Total: 0 (2021 census)
  - Density: 0.0/km^{2} (0/sq mi)
- Time zone: UTC+10:00 (AEST)
- Postcode: 4875
Suburbs around Burrar Islet
Torres Strait	Coral Sea	Coral Sea
Torres Strait	Burrar Islet	Coral Sea
Torres Strait	Coral Sea	Coral Sea

Burrar Islet is an island locality in the Torres Strait Island Region, Queensland, Australia. The locality consists of a single island, Bet Islet, also known as Burrar Islet. In the 2021 census, Burrar Islet had "no people or a very low population".

Burrar Islet's postcode is 4875.

== Geography ==
No development has taken place on the island.

== History ==
The island became a locality on 2 July 2010.

== Demographics ==
In the 2016 census and 2021 census, Burrar Islet had "no people or a very low population".

== Education ==
There are no schools on the island nor nearby. The alternatives are distance education and boarding school.

== See also ==
- List of Torres Strait Islands
