= Halfway Island (Queensland) =

Island in Torres Strait, Australia

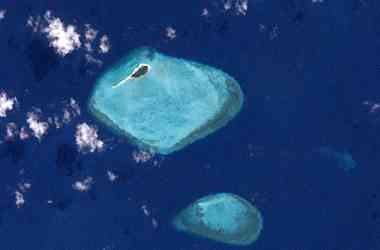
- Satellite image of Halfway Island (top) and Kodnasem Reef

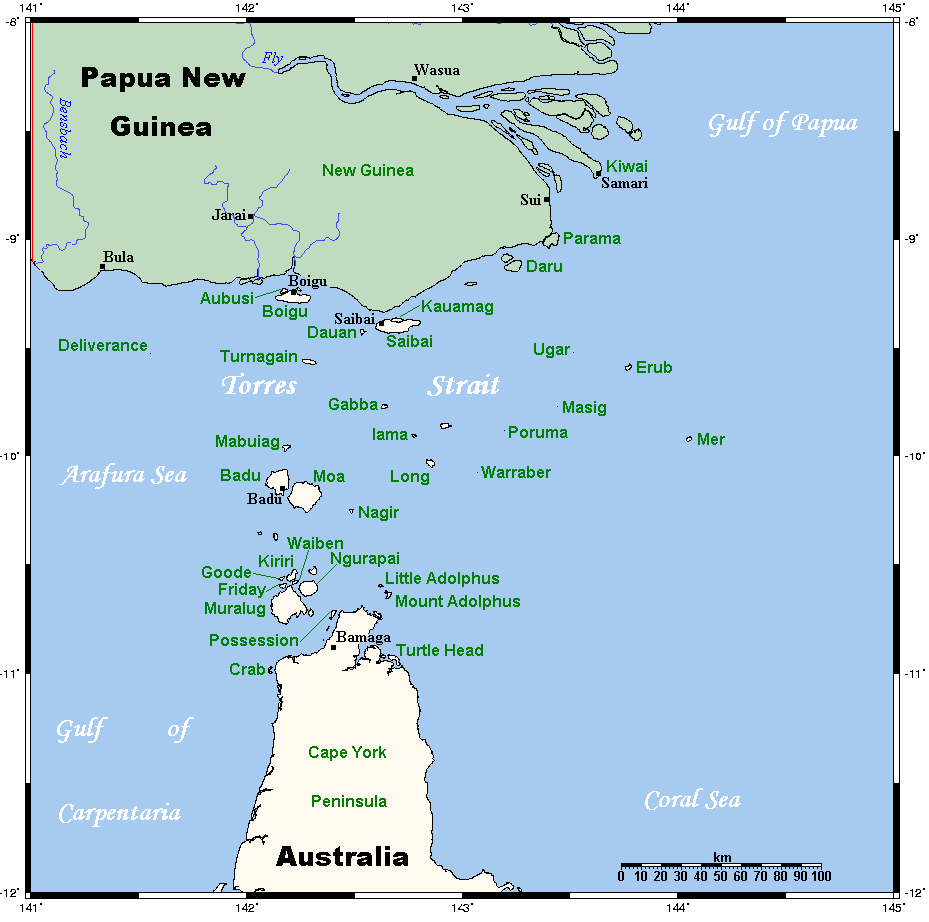
- A map of the Torres Strait Islands showing Masig in the north-eastern waters of Torres Strait

Geography
- Location: Northern Australia
- Coordinates: 10°06′20″S 143°19′15″E
- Archipelago: Torres Strait Islands
- Adjacent to: Torres Strait

Administration
- Australia
- State: Queensland

Halfway Island is an island of the Torres Strait Islands archipelago located approximately 150 kilometres (93 mi) northeast of Thursday Island in the Cumberland Passage of Torres Strait, Queensland, Australia. Halfway Island is about 100 kilometres (62 mi) west of Yule Entrance.

== Shipwrecks ==
- Governor Ready. Wooden ship, 512 tons. Built Prince Edward Island 1825. Captain John Young. Wrecked on a reef between Murray and Halfway Islands north-east of Cape York, May 1829. Nineteen in the longboat, twelve in a skiff and eight in the jolly boat escaped from the wreck and after touching at various uninhabited islands, were rescued by the brig Amity off Timor. They had travelled 2500 km in fourteen days. The Governor Ready had brought 200 convicts from England in 1828, and had sailed from Sydney for Batavia on 18 March 1829, when lost.

== See also ==
- List of Torres Strait Islands
