= Great Barrier Reef Marine Park =

Protected area of Queensland, Australia

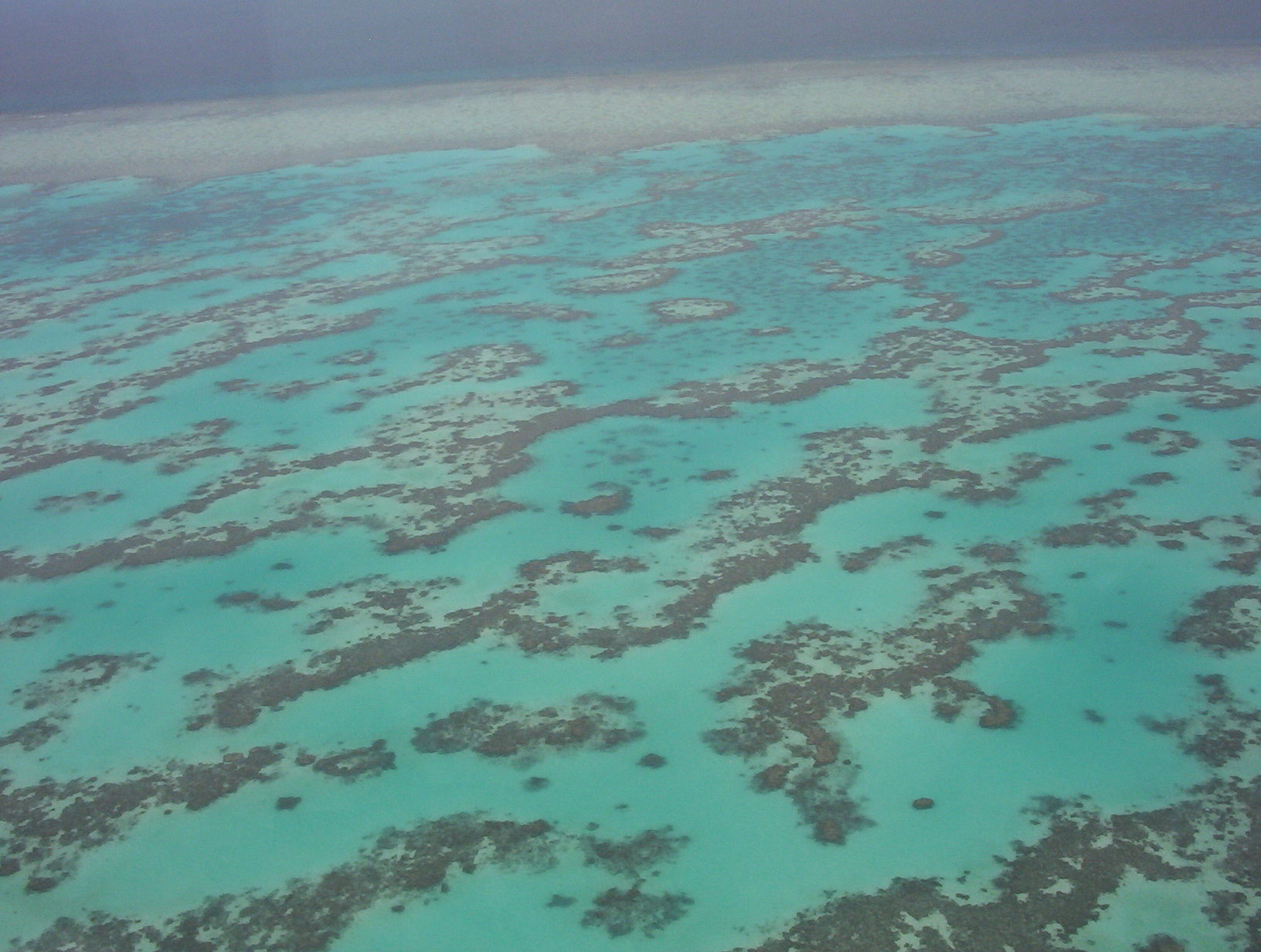

- Location within Queensland
- Location: Queensland
- Coordinates: 18°34′4″S 148°33′19″E
- Area: 343,966 km^{2} (132,806 sq mi)
- Established: 1975
- Governing body: Great Barrier Reef Marine Park Authority; Queensland Parks and Wildlife Service; Queensland Fisheries
- Website: Official website

The Great Barrier Reef Marine Park protects a large part of Australia's Great Barrier Reef from damaging activities. It is a vast multiple-use Marine Park which supports a wide range of uses, including commercial marine tourism, fishing, ports and shipping, recreation, scientific research and Indigenous traditional use. Fishing and the removal of artefacts or wildlife (fish, coral, seashells, etc.) is strictly regulated, and commercial shipping traffic must stick to certain specific defined shipping routes that avoid the most sensitive areas of the park. The Great Barrier Reef is the largest and best known coral reef ecosystem in the world. Its reefs, almost 3000 in total, represent about 10 per cent of all the coral reef areas in the world. It supports an amazing variety of biodiversity, providing a home to thousands of coral and other invertebrate species, bony fish, sharks, rays, marine mammals, marine turtles, sea snakes, as well as algae and other marine plants.

== Managing authority ==
The Great Barrier Reef Marine Park Authority (GBRMPA) is responsible for the care and protection of the Great Barrier Reef Marine Park. It uses a range of tools to manage the marine park including Acts and Regulations, zoning plan, plans of management, traditional owner agreements, partnerships, stewardship and best practice, education, research and monitoring and reporting. It issues permits for various forms of use of the marine park, and monitors usage in the park to ensure compliance with rules and regulations associated with the park. GBRMPA is funded by Commonwealth Government appropriations and an environmental management charge levied on the permit-holders' passengers. Currently this is A$8.50 per day per passenger (to a maximum of $16.50 per trip).

In May 2022, the Darumbal people were officially recognised as the traditional custodians of an expanse of ocean covering 36,606 km^{2} (14,134 sq mi) off the Central Queensland Coast, making it the largest Traditional Use of Marine Resources Agreement (TUMRA) on the reef. The agreement created a partnership with GBRMPA and Queensland's Department of Environment, Tourism, Science and Innovation. The occasion was marked by a ceremony on the beach at Emu Park.

== Description ==
=== Extent ===
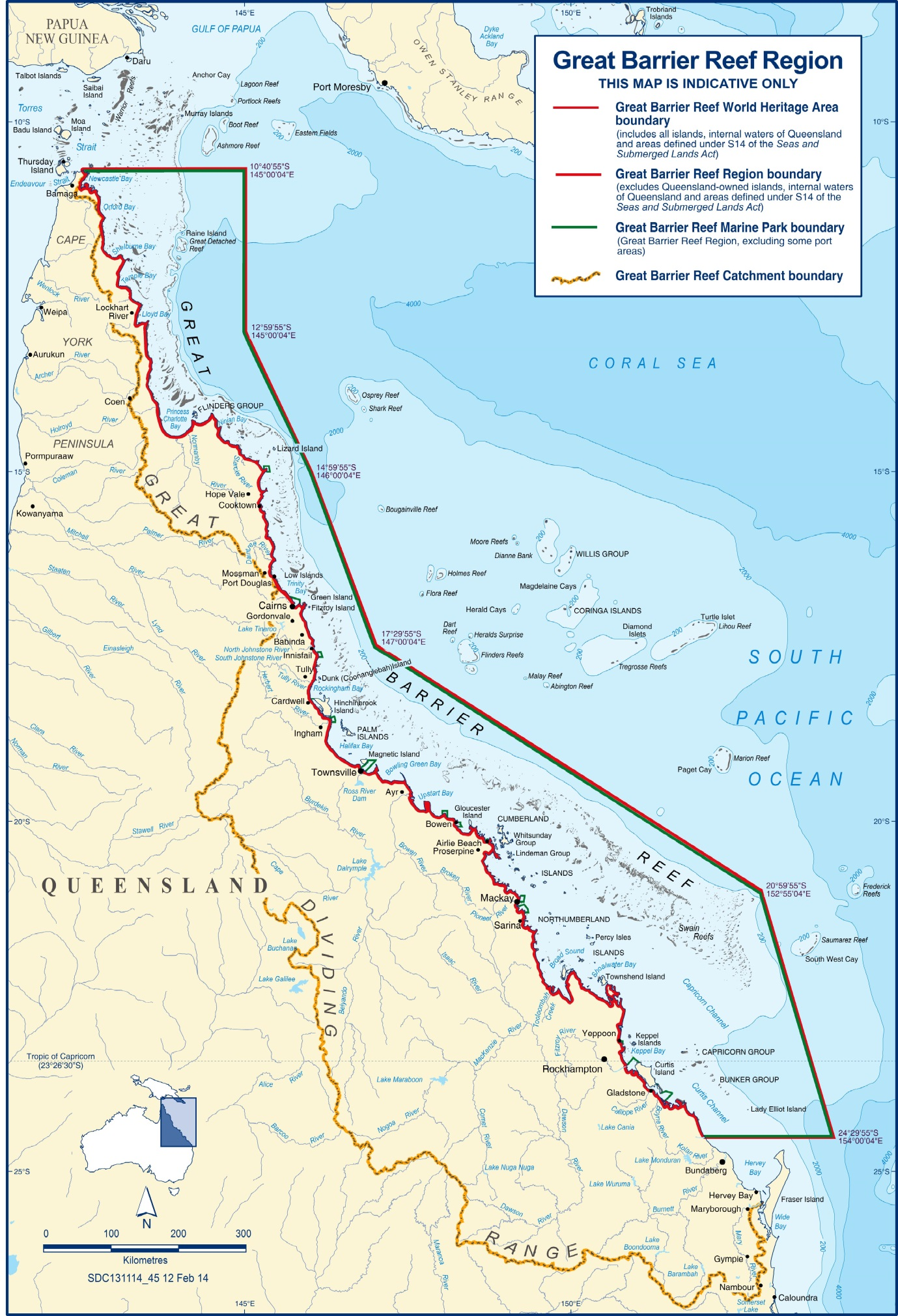
Map of The Great Barrier Reef Region, World Heritage Area and Marine Park, 2014

The marine park lies east of the mainland coast of Queensland, starting in the north at Cape York. Its northern boundary is the circle of latitude 10°41'S (running east up to the eastern edge of the Great Barrier Reef at 145º19'33"E), thereby encompassing those few uninhabited Torres Strait Islands that are east of Cape York, south of 10°41'S and north of 11°00'S. The largest of those island are Albany Island (5.9 km^{2} or 2.3 sq mi), Turtle Head Island 12.8 km^{2} or 4.9 sq mi and Trochus Island 2.2 km^{2} or 0.85 sq mi. Further islands are Mai Island 0.25 km^{2} or 0.097 sq mi, Bush Island 0.2 km^{2} or 0.077 sq mi, Tree Islet 0.01 km^{2} or 0.0039 sq mi, Brewis Island 0.05 km^{2} or 0.019 sq mi, and a few unnamed islets.

Its southern boundary lies south of Gladstone and north of Bundaberg, taking in Lady Elliot Island.

=== Protected area designation ===
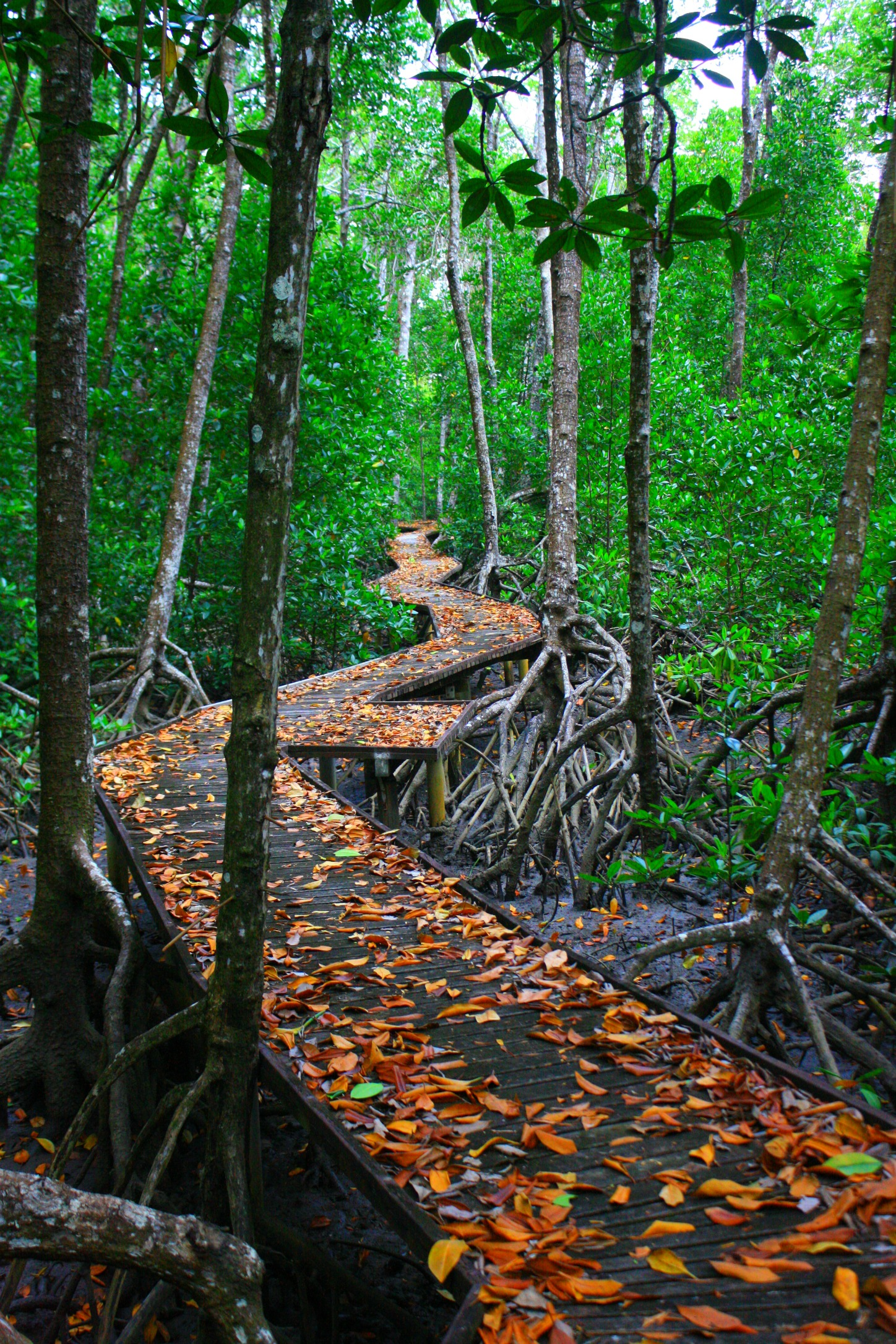
Boardwalk through a mangrove forest featured in Estuarine Conservation Zone as part of The Great Barrier Reef Marine Park

As of 2016, zones within the marine park has been categorized into the following IUCN protected area categories:

- IUCN Category Ia with an area of 859 square kilometres (332 sq mi) being about 0.2% of the marine park's area,
- IUCN Category II with an area of 114,309 square kilometres (44,135 sq mi) being about 33%,
- IUCN Category IV with an area of 15,027 square kilometres (5,802 sq mi) being about 4% and
- IUCN Category VI with an area of 213,769 square kilometres (82,537 sq mi) being about 62%.

== History ==
In 1975, the Government of Australia enacted the Great Barrier Reef Marine Park Act 1975, which created the Great Barrier Reef Marine Park Authority, and defined what acts were prohibited on the Reef. Joe Baker, who was involved in the bid to make the Great Barrier Reef World Heritage-listed in 1981, was a founding member of the Great Barrier Reef Marine Park Authority.

The Australian Government also has recognised the ecological significance of this Park by its inclusion in the nation's Biodiversity Action Plan. The Government of Australia manages the reef through the Great Barrier Reef Marine Park Authority and in partnership with the Government of Queensland, to ensure that it is widely understood and used in a sustainable manner. A combination of zoning, management plans, permits, education and incentives (such as eco-tourism certification) is used in the effort to conserve the Great Barrier Reef.

As many species of the Great Barrier Reef are migratory, many international, national, and interstate conventions or pieces of legislation must be taken into account when strategies for conservation are made.

Some international conventions that the Great Barrier Reef Marine Park must follow are: the Bonn Convention, Ramsar Site (for the Bowling Green Bay National Park site), CITES, JAMBA and CAMBA. Some national legislation that the Park must follow are: Great Barrier Reef Marine Park Act 1975, Environment Protection and Biodiversity Conservation Act 1999, National Strategy for Ecologically Sustainable Development, National Strategy for the Conservation of Australia's Biological Diversity, Australia's Oceans Policy, National Strategy for the Conservation of Australian Species and Communities Threatened with Extinction. Some state legislation that the Park must follow are: Nature Conservation Act 1992, Marine Parks Act 1982, Fisheries Act 1994, Queensland Nature Conservation (Wildlife) Regulation 1994.

For example, the Queensland Government has enacted several plans attempting to regulate fishing. The East Coast Trawl Management Plan 1999 aimed to regulate trawling through limiting the times when trawling is permitted and restricting gear used. The Fisheries (Coral Reef Fin Fish Fishery) Management Plan 2003 aimed at reducing the annual commercial catch to 1996 levels, disallowing fishing when the fish are spawning and increasing the minimum legal size of fish.

The Great Barrier Reef was selected as a World Heritage Site in 1981. Up until 1999, there were four main zones in the Great Barrier Reef Marine Park. They were the "Far Northern", "Cairns", "Central" and "Mackay/Capricorn" sections. These zoning sections were created between 1983 and 1987. Another section, the "Gumoo Woojabuddee" section was declared in 1998. Each section had its own zoning plan. The Great Barrier Marine Park Zoning Plan 2003 superseded all previous zoning plans, coming into effect on 1 July 2004.

In July 2004, a new zoning plan was brought into effect for the entire Marine Park, and has been widely acclaimed as a new global benchmark for the conservation of marine ecosystems. The rezoning was based on the application of systematic conservation planning techniques, using the MARXAN software. On 1 July 2004 the Great Barrier Reef Marine Park became the largest protected sea area in the world when the Australian Government increased the areas protected from extractive activities (such as fishing) from 4.6% to 33.3% of the park. As of 2006, the Northwestern Hawaiian Islands National Monument is the largest protected marine area in the world. The management committee draws inspiration from the Great Barrier Reef Marine Park Authority's management strategies.

The current method of zoning is called the "Representative Areas Program", which chooses "typical" areas of the Great Barrier Reef Marine Park. They can then be protected in "Green Zones" (no-take zones). The Great Barrier Reef World Heritage Area has been divided into 70 bioregions, of which 30 are reef bioregions, and 40 are non-reef bioregions.

In 2006, a review was undertaken of the Great Barrier Reef Marine Park Act 1975. Some recommendations of the review are that there should be no further zoning plan changes until 2013, and that every five years, a peer-reviewed Outlook Report should be published, examining the health of the Great Barrier Reef, the management of the Reef, and environmental pressures.

In early 2007, GBRMPA was one of three nominees for the Destination Award in the World Travel and Tourism Council's Tourism for Tomorrow Awards.

On 3 April 2010, the Shen Neng 1, a Chinese ship carrying 950 tonnes of oil, ran aground, causing the 2010 Great Barrier Reef oil spill.

In 2012, legislation was introduced which compelled developers to deposit money into the Reef Trust. Professor Tiffany Morrison argues that this has made it easier for developments to be approved in the region.

The week before 21 July 2013, on the second day of the biennial joint training exercise Talisman Saber, two American AV-8B Harrier fighter jets launched from aircraft carrier USS Bonhomme Richard (LHD-6) dropped four bombs, weighing a total 1.8 tonnes (4,000 pounds), into more than 50 metres (164 ft) of water. None exploded and no coral was damaged.

People such as scientists, conservationists, developers, managers, tourism entrepreneurs and politicians have had major influences on the history of the reef. In 2015, the Australian Government and Reef Ecologic Pty Ltd conducted a coral reef training course to build capacity to protect coral reefs.

== Threats ==
=== Crown-of-thorns starfish ===
The crown-of-thorns starfish (Acanthaster planci), while native to the reef, poses one of its greatest threats when outbreaks occur. Several efforts have been made to identify and control these outbreaks, including the COTSBot developed by Queensland University of Technology.

These outbreaks and subsequent threats have led to an increase in awareness and appearances in mainstream media, as industry and conservation groups try to control the COTS and protect the reef. An infographic explaining the process of identifying and targeting this threat can be seen here.

=== Outlook for the Reef ===
The Great Barrier Reef Outlook Report 2014, published every five years, examines the Great Barrier Reef's health, pressures, and likely future.

The report is required under Great Barrier Reef Marine Park Act 1975 (section 54) and aims to provide a regular and reliable means of assessing reef health and management in an accountable and transparent way.

The report finds the greatest risks to the Reef are still climate change, land-based run-off, coastal development, some fishing impacts, illegal fishing and poaching.

== Associated protected areas ==
The Great Barrier Reef Coast Marine Park is a marine protected area located in Queensland waters adjoining the Great Barrier Reef. It was created on 5 November 2004 by the amalgamation of the following former marine parks – the Mackay/Capricorn Marine Park, the Townville/Whitsunday Marine Park, the Trinity Inlet/ Marlin Coast Marine Park and the Cairns Marine Park, along with the addition of previously unprotected area of coastal water that adjoined the former marine parks listed above. The marine park is intended to complement the adjoining GBRMP by the use of "similar zone objectives, and entry and use provisions". It is managed by the Queensland Parks and Wildlife Service.

== See also ==
- Reef HQ – National Education Centre for the Great Barrier Reef
- Tourism on the Great Barrier Reef

=== Places in the Great Barrier Reef Marine Park ===
- Beanley Island
- Beesley Island
- Bewick Island
- Blackwood Island
- Chapman Island
- Clerke Island
- Gore Island
- Haggerston Island
- Hales Island
- Halfway Islet
- Hampton Island
- Hannibal Islands
- Hay Island
- Hicks Island
- Howick Island
- Lady Elliot Island
- Perry Island
- Turtle Head Island
