= Sue Islet (Queensland) =

Islet in Queensland, Australia

Sue Island
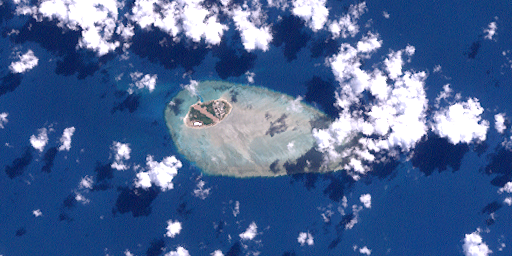
- Satellite image
- Interactive map of Sue Island

Administration
- Australia
- State: Queensland

Sue Islet (or Sue Island), also known as Warraber, is the middle islet of The Three Sisters, Torres Strait, Queensland, Australia. This island is one of the Torres Strait Islands and is within the locality of Warraber Islet in the Torres Strait Island Region.

== Geography ==
It is in the Vigilant Channel. Situated on a coral cay, Sue Island has an abundance of traditional foods such as wongai and coconuts. Fish, turtles and dugong inhabit the warm waters and coral reefs surrounding the island.

The island is threatened by rising sea levels, and coastal defences have been built on many of the beaches on the island. The Intergovernmental Panel on Climate Change (IPCC) has predicted that by 2100, tides will rise by 30–110 cm, depending on the timing and level of cuts to carbon emissions.

== History ==
Warraber Island State School was opened on 29 January 1985. On 1 January 2007 it became the Warraber Island campus of the Tagai State College.

== People ==
The people of Sue Island are part of the Kulkalaig, of the Central Islands of Torres Strait, including Nagi. Specifically, the Nagilgal and of Waraberalgal are the same people. Life on the island remains very traditional and includes hunting, dancing, and thayilai (feasts); vital components of contemporary life.

== Language ==
The day-to-day language of Warraber is Brokan (Torres Strait Creole); however, the traditional language of the people of Waraber is Kulkalgau Ya, one of the four dialects of Kalaw Lagaw Ya.

Kulkalagau Ya phrases:

Ni midhadh? How are you?

Ninu nel nga? What is your name?

Stuwa unaga? Where is the store?

Ninu waru ubilaig, au? Do you like turtle?

Ni kulkalgadh yamuleka, au? Do you speak Kulkalgau Ya?

Ni markaidh muleka, au? Do you speak English?

Ina ngau mudh. This is my house.

Kayib mina kapu goeiga. This is a really nice day.

Maal kapu idi. The sea is dead calm.

Inabi ai mina kapu mithalnga. This food is very delicious.

Aye, ngoeba buthuka. Come, let's go to the beach.

== Religion ==
Many Sue Islanders still retain strong links to their traditional religion, centring on ancestor worship, including a totemic clan structure. An important religious figure was Kulka, one of Malo-Bomai's brothers. The inhabitants (Kulkalgal) are named for Kulka.

On 1 July every year the residents of Sue Island hold the Coming of the Light Festival. On this date in 1871, a Christian reverend named Samuel MacFarlane of the London Missionary Society came to convert the Indigenous people of the Torres Strait to Christianity, known as the Coming of the Light.

There are two churches on the island. St Peter's Church, a former Anglican Church, is now within the Diocese of the Independent Christian Church in the Torres Strait. There is also a Pentecostal Assemblies of God Church.

== Education ==
Warraber Island Campus is a primary (Early Childhood - Grade 6) campus of Tagai State College in Yessie Street in the town of Sue Island (10.2063°S 142.8279°E).

== Facilities ==
Warraber Island has an Indigenous Knowledge Centre operated by the Torres Strait Island Regional Council. It functions as a library and a visitor centre.

== Navigation ==
This island houses new ship tracking and communications technologies (Automatic Identification Systems) and ship polling via the INMARSAT C satellite system.

== See also ==
- Warraber Island Airport
