= Port Musgrave =

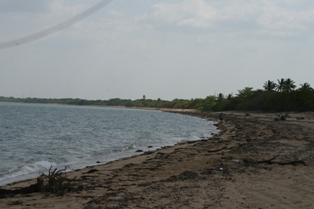
- The south shore of Port Musgrave, near Mapoon Aboriginal Community

- Location of Port Musgrave in Queensland
- Location: Far North Queensland
- Coordinates: 11°57′11″S 141°55′26″E
- Type: Estuarine bay
- Etymology: In honour of Sir Anthony Musgrave
- Part of: Port Musgrave Aggregation DIWA nationally important wetland
- River sources: Ducie River; Wenlock River; Namaleta Creek
- Ocean/sea sources: Gulf of Carpentaria; Arafura Sea
- Basin countries: Australia
- Surface elevation: 0 m (0 ft)
- Frozen: never
- Settlements: Mapoon

Port Musgrave is a shallow, almost enclosed, estuarine bay located on the western coast of the Cape York Peninsula in Far North Queensland, Australia.

== Geography ==
Two major rivers, the Wenlock and the Ducie, discharge into it. The bay itself and the area surrounding it are defined as the Port Musgrave Aggregation DIWA nationally important wetland. The surrounding area is rich in freshwater swamps, while the estuary itself has tidal flats and mangroves, including stands of the Nipa Palm. It is an important breeding area for saltwater crocodiles. The small Aboriginal community of Mapoon lies on the southern shore of the bay.

== History ==
Uradhi (also known as Anggamudi, Ankamuti, Atampaya, Bawtjathi, and Lotiga) is an Australian Aboriginal language of the Western Cape York Peninsula. The traditional language region includes north of Mapoon and Duyfken Point and east of the coast strip to the north of Port Musgrave (Angkamuthi country) incorporating the mouth of the Ducie River, the lower reaches of the Dulhunty River and the upper reaches of the Skardon River in the north. Following the displacement of Indigenous people by British settlement, it was also spoken in the Northern Peninsula Area Region including the communities of New Mapoon, Injinoo and Cowal Creek.

The bay was discovered by Europeans in 1887 by Hugh Milinan and Edward Cullen who named the bay in honour of Sir Anthony Musgrave, at the time, the Governor of Queensland.
