= Northern Peninsula Airport =

Airport in Queensland, Australia

Northern Peninsula Airport (formerly Bamaga Airport)
- IATA: ABM; ICAO: YNPE

Summary
- Airport type: Public
- Operator: Northern Peninsula Area Regional Council
- Location: Bamaga, Queensland, Australia
- Elevation AMSL: 34 ft / 10 m
- Coordinates: 10°57′03″S 142°27′34″E

Map
- Location in Queensland

Runways
Direction	Length		Surface
Direction	m	ft	Surface
13/31	1,834	6,017	Asphalt
- Sources: Australian AIP and aerodrome chart

Northern Peninsula Airport (IATA: ABM, ICAO: YNPE) is an airport serving Bamaga, a town near the northern tip of the Cape York Peninsula and is located 5 nautical miles (9.3 km; 5.8 mi) southeast of Injinoo in Queensland, Australia. The airport is operated by the Northern Peninsula Area Regional Council. It was known as Bamaga Airport or Bamaga/Injinoo Airport and had the ICAO code YBAM.

== Facilities ==
The airport resides at an elevation of 34 ft (10 m) above sea level. It has one runway designated 13/31 with an asphalt surface measuring 1,834 m × 30 m (6,017 ft × 98 ft).

== History ==
Built in late 1942 and known as Jacky Jacky Field, the airfield was renamed Higgins Field in 1943 in honour of Flight Lieutenant Brian Hartley Higgins. Operated as a dispersal field for Horn Island.

Royal Australian Air Force units based at Higgins Field during World War II included:

- No. 1 Repair and Salvage Unit RAAF
- No. 5 Repair and Salvage Unit RAAF
- No. 7 Squadron RAAF
- No. 23 Squadron RAAF
- No. 33 Operational Base Unit RAAF
- No. 34 Squadron RAAF
- No. 52 Radar Station RAAF was at nearby Mutee Head
- 105th Light Field Ambulance

== Airlines and destinations ==
Airlines	Destinations
Skytrans Australia	Cairns, Horn Island

== See also ==
- List of airports in Queensland
