= Lockerbie Scrub =

Coordinates: 10°48′07″S 142°28′31″E

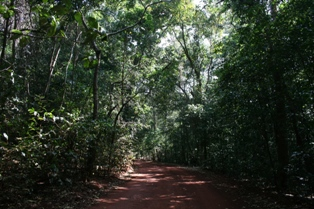
Lockerbie Scrub rainforest.

Lockerbie Scrub is a 230 km^{2} area of closed forest and woodland, surrounded by open tropical savanna woodland, at the northern tip of the Cape York Peninsula in Far North Queensland, Australia.

== Description ==
The Scrub consists of lowland rainforest, eucalypt tall open forest and closed eucalypt woodland. The rainforest type represented there is predominantly semi-deciduous notophyll vine forest growing upon a number of different soil types. The climate is monsoonal with well-defined wet and dry seasons. Land tenure is mainly Aboriginal (Deed of Grant in Trust) land, with pockets of freehold around the communities of New Mapoon and Bamaga.

== Fauna ==
=== Mammals ===
Northern quolls, spectacled flying foxes and bare-backed fruit bats occur in the Lockerbie Scrub.

=== Birds ===
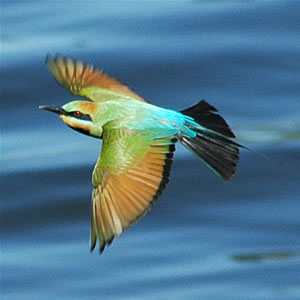
The Scrub forms part of the route used by rainbow bee-eaters migrating between New Guinea and Australia

Some 158 km^{2} of the Lockerbie Scrub has been identified by BirdLife International as an Important Bird Area (IBA) because it is a significant migratory bottleneck for spangled drongos and rainbow bee-eaters, as well as supporting populations of lovely fairywrens and yellow-spotted honeyeaters.

Also present in the area are several birds whose Australian range is limited to the Cape York Peninsula, including palm cockatoos, yellow-billed kingfishers, Papuan pittas, trumpet manucodes, magnificent riflebirds, fawn-breasted bowerbirds, northern scrub robins, yellow-legged flycatchers, tropical scrubwrens and frill-necked monarchs. The endangered southern cassowary was recorded in Lockerbie Scrub in 1986 but is now probably extinct there. Bush stone-curlews, silver-crowned friarbirds and yellow honeyeaters have been recorded on rare occasions. Graceful honeyeaters are common. White-streaked honeyeaters are present.
