= Umagico, Queensland =

Umagico
- Town
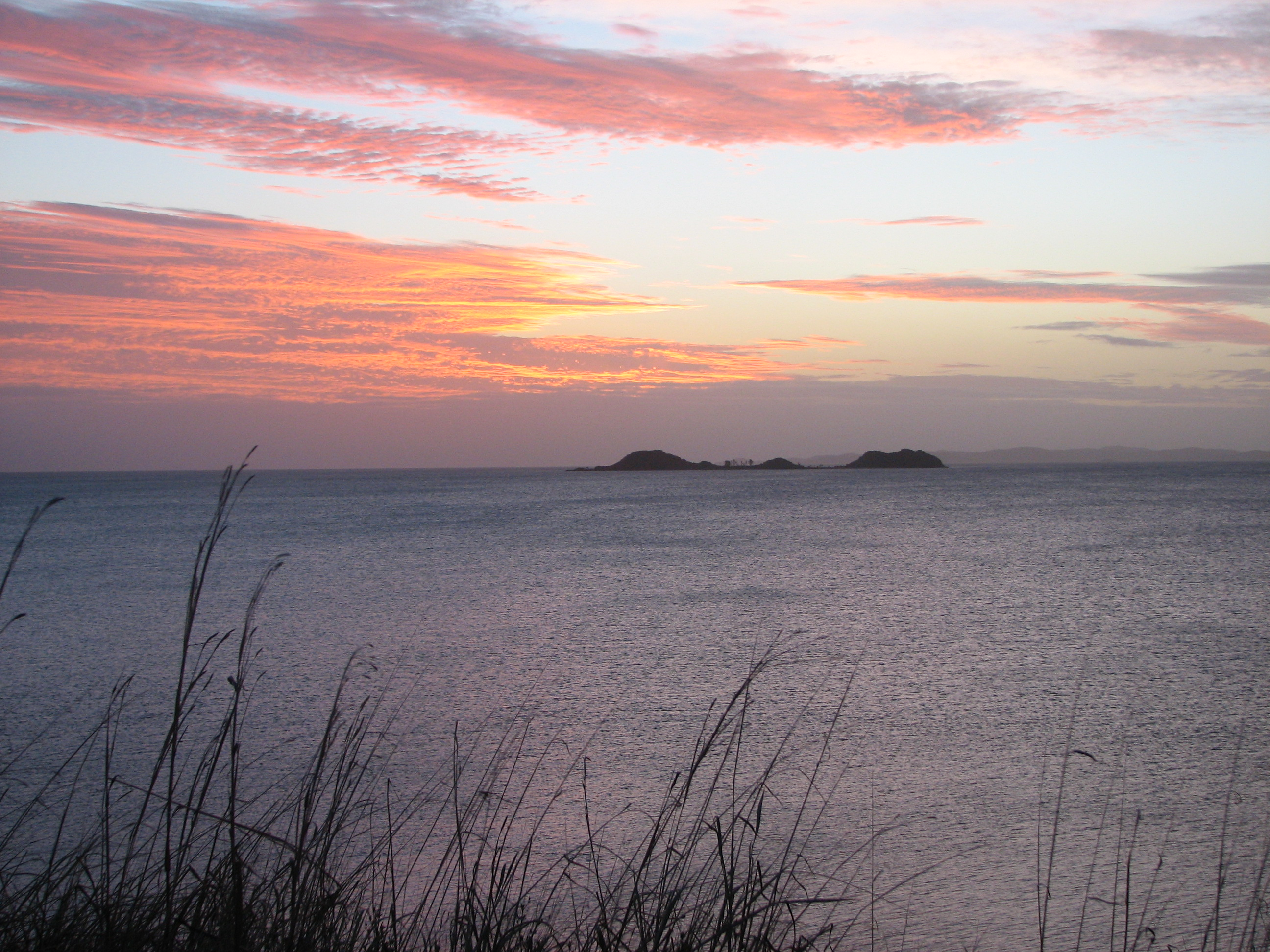
- View across the sea at Umagico, 2007

- Interactive map of Umagico
- Coordinates: 10.8926°S 142.3511°E
- Country: Australia
- State: Queensland
- LGA: Northern Peninsula Area Region
- Location: 4.8 km (3.0 mi) W of Bamaga; 470 km (290 mi) NNE of Weipa; 827 km (514 mi) NNW of Cooktown; 998 km (620 mi) NNW of Cairns; 2,792 km (1,735 mi) NNW of Brisbane

Government
  - State electorate: Cook
  - Federal division: Leichhardt

Area
  - Total: 51.3 km^{2} (19.8 sq mi)

Population
  - Total: 394 (2021 census)
  - Density: 7.680/km^{2} (19.89/sq mi)
- Time zone: UTC+10:00 (AEST)
- Postcode: 4876
Localities around Umagico
Torres Strait	Seisia	New Mapoon
Injinoo	Umagico	Bamaga
Injinoo	Jardin River	Somerset

Umagico is a town and coastal locality in the Northern Peninsula Area Region, Queensland, Australia. In the 2021 census, the locality of Umagico had a population of 394 people.

Umagico is one of the five communities which collectively form the Northern Peninsula Area. The landmass of the Northern Peninsula Area consists of 1,030 square kilometres (400 sq mi) in the northernmost region of Cape York Peninsula. Apart from Umagico, the other communities in the Northern Peninsula Area are Injinoo, New Mapoon, Seisia and Bamaga. There is an undeveloped town Aloa (10.8848°S 142.3511°E) located on the coast.

== History ==
Umagico, originally and still locally known as Alau, was one of several traditional Aboriginal camping sites on the western beaches of Northern Cape York Peninsula. The Gumakudin people are thought to have traditionally occupied Alau prior to first contact with the British.

In 1897, Archibald Meston submitted a report on the Aborigines of Queensland in which he suggested the population between Newcastle Bay and Cape York had decreased from 3,000 to less than 300 people. By 1900, Aboriginal populations in the Cape York Peninsula area had been decimated as a result of introduced disease, exclusions from traditional hunting grounds, and by the brutality of the Native Police and Somerset's Police Magistrates, most notoriously Frank Jardine.

By 1915, remnants of the Aboriginal population had autonomously regrouped at Red Island Point (later known as Seisia) and Cowal Creek (known then as Small River and later as Injinoo). Both communities approached the Queensland Government for land to establish gardens, leading to the creation of an Aboriginal reserve at Cowal Creek in 1915.

By 1918, the Cowal Creek community was functioning as a self-sufficient community, managed by a self-elected council. The community grew during the 1920s and 1930s with the inclusion of Aboriginal groups who moved from the McDonnell Ranges, Red Island Point and Seven Rivers. In 1923, Anglican missionaries and school teachers arrived at Cowal Creek and increasingly took on administrative functions in the community.

After World War II, populations in Northern Cape York Peninsula were again transformed, as Torres Strait Islanders began resettling in the area. The government began developing the area to accommodate this settlement and encouraged other Islanders to come. Saibai Islanders affected by a storm surge that inundated their island in 1948 established communities at Red Island Point at Muttee Heads. The government created a reserve at Red Island Point in 1948. This reserve was amalgamated with the adjoining Cowal Creek Reserve. After the amalgamation, the reserve consisted of 97,620 acres populated by around 350 people.

During the 1950s, many of the Saibai Islanders who established themselves at Muttee Heads and Red Island Point moved to Bamaga as the government developed the township, erected accommodation and developed agricultural and sawmilling industries. Bamaga was established as the administrative centre for the Northern Peninsula Area.

Umagico was established in 1963 when the government relocated 64 Aboriginal people from Lockhart River Mission to the area. After the Anglican Church relinquished responsibility for the Lockhart River Mission in 1960, the government proposed closing down the mission and resettling residents at Bamaga. The majority of residents rejected this proposal and remained at the old mission site. Those resettled at Umagico accepted the site as an alternative.

After the Lockhart River community was re-established at the current site by the government in 1970, some of the people who had been relocated to the Umagico area in the 1960s returned to live at Lockhart. At this time, people from Moa Island in the western Torres Strait were also resettled at Umagico.

Umagico Indigenous Knowledge Centre was established in 2012.

== Demographics ==
In the 2016 census, the locality of Umagico had a population of 427 people. 94.1% identified as Aboriginal or Torres Strait Islander people, compared to 4.0% for Queensland and 2.7% for Australia.

In the 2021 census, the locality of Umagico had a population of 394 people. 89.8% identified as Aboriginal or Torres Strait Islander people, compared to 4.8% for Queensland and 3.2% for Australia.

== Education ==
There are no schools at Umagico. The nearest government primary schools are the junior campus of Northern Peninsula Area College in neighbouring Injinoo to the south-west and the junior campus of Northern Peninsula Area College in neighbouring Bamaga to the east. The nearest government secondary school is the senior campus of the Northern Peninsula Area College, also in Bamaga.

== Amenities ==
The Northern Peninsula Area Regional Council operates the Umagico Indigenous Knowledge Centre at 8 Charlie Street (10.89238°S 142.35140°E).

Umagico Community Hall is on the south-east corner of Peter Street and Wassey Street (10.8920°S 142.3533°E).

== Facilities ==
Umagico Primary Health Care Centre is on the corner of Charlie Street and Woosup Street (10.8925°S 142.3505°E).

Umagico cemetery is in Pascoe Street (10.8908°S 142.3474°E).
