= Jardine River, Queensland =

Jardine River
- Suburb
- Interactive map of Jardine River
- Coordinates: 11.3208°S 142.7358°E
- Country: Australia
- State: Queensland
- LGAs: Shire of Cook; Shire of Torres
- Location: 22.6 km (14.0 mi) S of Bamaga; 799 km (496 mi) NNW of Cooktown; 968 km (601 mi) NNW of Cairns; 2,640 km (1,640 mi) NNW of Brisbane

Government
  - State electorate: Cook
  - Federal division: Leichhardt

Area
  - Total: 3,955.5 km^{2} (1,527.2 sq mi)

Population
  - Total: 0 (2021 census)
  - Density: 0.00000/km^{2} (0.0000/sq mi)
- Postcode: 4874
Suburbs around Jardine River
| Umagico | Somerset | Coral Sea |
| Injinoo | Jardine River | Coral Sea |
| Mapoon | Shelburne | Shelburne |

Jardine River is a coastal locality split between the Shire of Cook and the Shire of Torres in Queensland, Australia. In the 2021 census, Jardine River had "no people or a very low population".

== Geography ==
Most of the locality is within protected areas apart from small areas in the north and east of the locality.

== History ==
The locality takes its name from the river Jardine River which was originally called Deception River but was renamed by Governor of Queensland George Ferguson Bowen after Francis Lascelles Jardine and Alexander William Jardine. In 1864–1865 the Jardines overlanded stock from Rockhampton to Somerset on the Cape York Peninsula.

== Demographics ==
In the 2016 census, Jardine River had "no people or a very low population".

In the 2021 census, Jardine River had "no people or a very low population".

== Education ==
There are no schools in Jardine River. The nearest government primary school and secondary school is Northern Peninsula Area College which has primary school campus in neighbouring Injinoo to the west and primary school and secondary schools campuses in Bamaga to the north. However, students in the south of the locality would be too distant to attend the college; the alternatives are distance education and boarding school.
