= Northern Peninsula =

Northern Peninsula may refer to:

- Great Northern Peninsula in Newfoundland, Canada
- Northern Peninsula Area Region in far northern Queensland, Australia
- Northern or Upper Peninsula of Michigan in the United States
