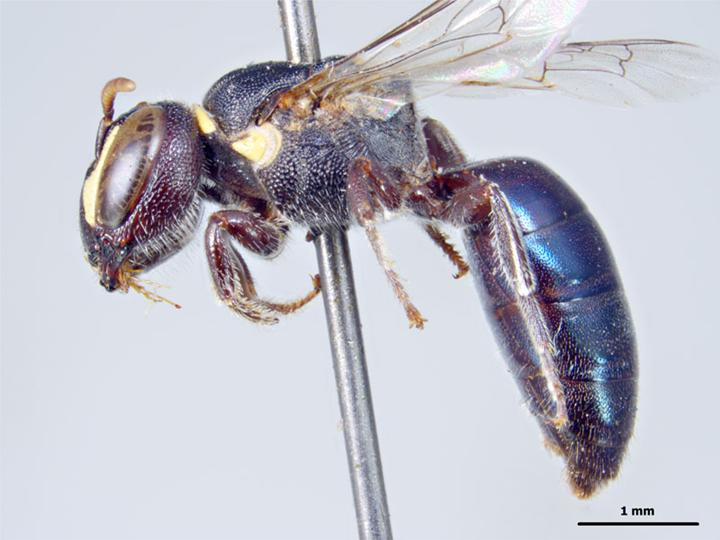
- Female

Scientific classification
- Kingdom: Animalia
- Phylum: Arthropoda
- Clade: Pancrustacea
- Class: Insecta
- Order: Hymenoptera
- Family: Colletidae
- Genus: Hylaeus
- Species: H. cyanurus

Binomial name
- Hylaeus cyanurus (Kirby, 1802)

Synonyms
- Melitta cyanura Kirby, 1802; Prosopis pachygnatha Cockerell, 1910

= Hylaeus cyanurus =

Species of bee

Hylaeus cyanurus, or Hylaeus (Euprosopoides) cyanurus, is a species of bee in the family Colletidae and subfamily Hylaeinae. It is endemic to Australia. It was described by English entomologist William Kirby in 1802.

== Distribution and habitat ==
The species occurs in north-eastern Australia. Type localities include Cooktown, Queensland. It has also been recorded from Jardine River and Mackay in Queensland, and Nourlangie Creek in the Northern Territory.

== Behaviour ==
The adults are flying mellivores. Flowering plants visited by the bees include Pogostemon and Tristaniopsis species.
