= Phyllophorella queenslandica =

Scientific classification
- Kingdom: Animalia
- Phylum: Arthropoda
- Clade: Pancrustacea
- Class: Insecta
- Order: Orthoptera
- Suborder: Ensifera
- Family: Tettigoniidae
- Genus: Phyllophorella
- Species: P. queenslandica

Binomial name
- Phyllophorella queenslandica Rentz, Su & Ueshima, 2009

Species of insect

Phyllophorella queenslandica is a species of bush crickets or katydids described in 2009. It is commonly known as the small hooded katydid or Queensland small hooded katydid. The species is native to Far North Queensland, from Kuranda to the Lockerbie area.
