= Wenlock River =

River in Queensland, Australia

Wenlock
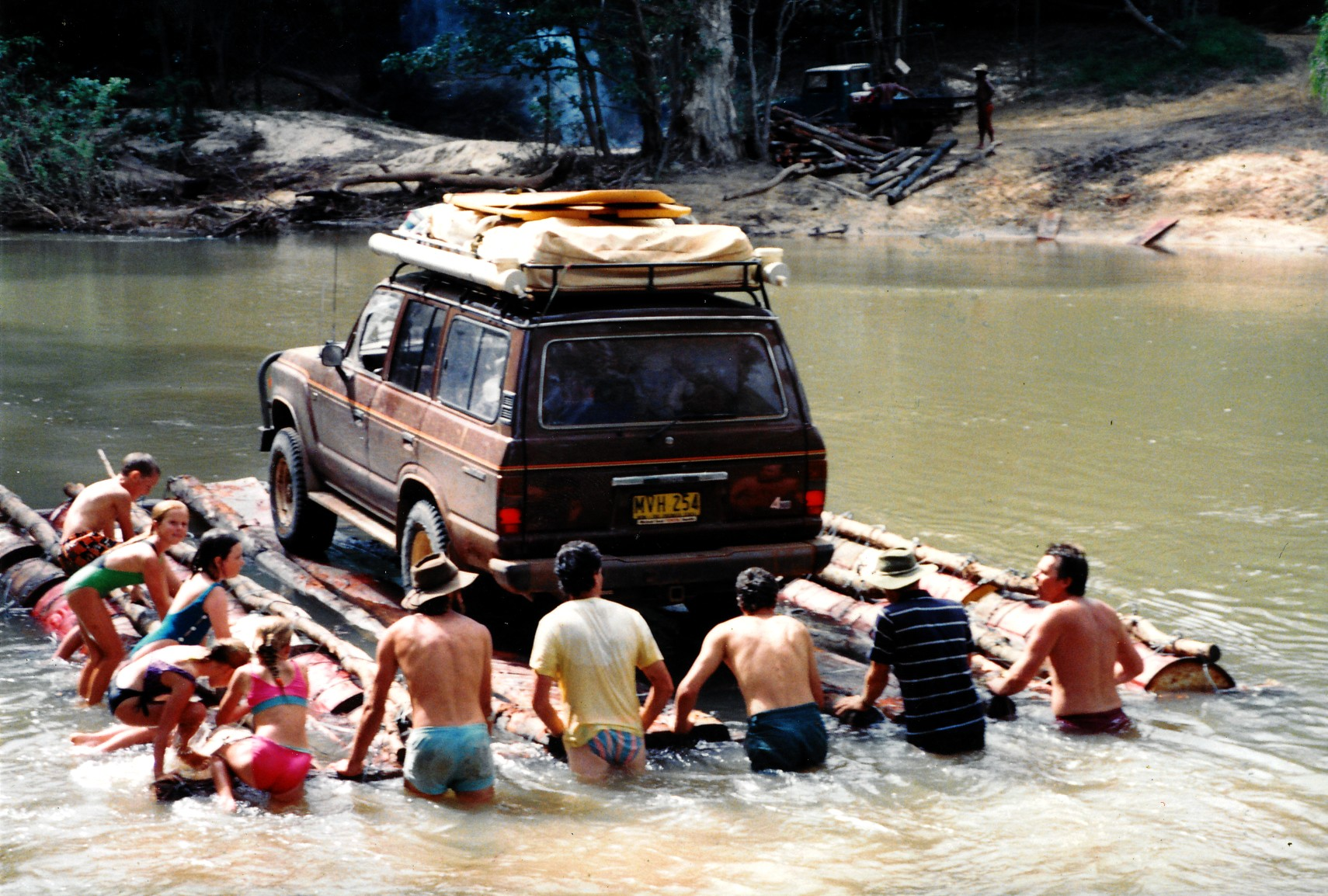
- Crossing the Wenlock River on a makeshift vehicle raft in Wet Season, 1988. This was the only safe way to cross the river until the installation of a bridge in 2001.

- Location of the Wenlock River mouth in Queensland
- Etymology: In honour of Baron Wenlock

Location
- Country: Australia
- State: Queensland
- Region: Far North Queensland

Physical characteristics
- Source: Great Dividing Range
  - location: below Jacks Knob
  - elevation: 215 m (705 ft)
- Mouth: Port Musgrave, Gulf of Carpentaria
  - location: Mapoon
  - coordinates: 12°00′54″S 141°55′50″E
  - elevation: 0 m (0 ft)
- Length: 322 km (200 mi)
- Basin size: 7,526 km^{2} (2,906 sq mi)

Basin features
- Waterfall: Wenlock Falls

The Wenlock River is a river on the Cape York Peninsula in Far North Queensland, Australia.

== Course and features ==
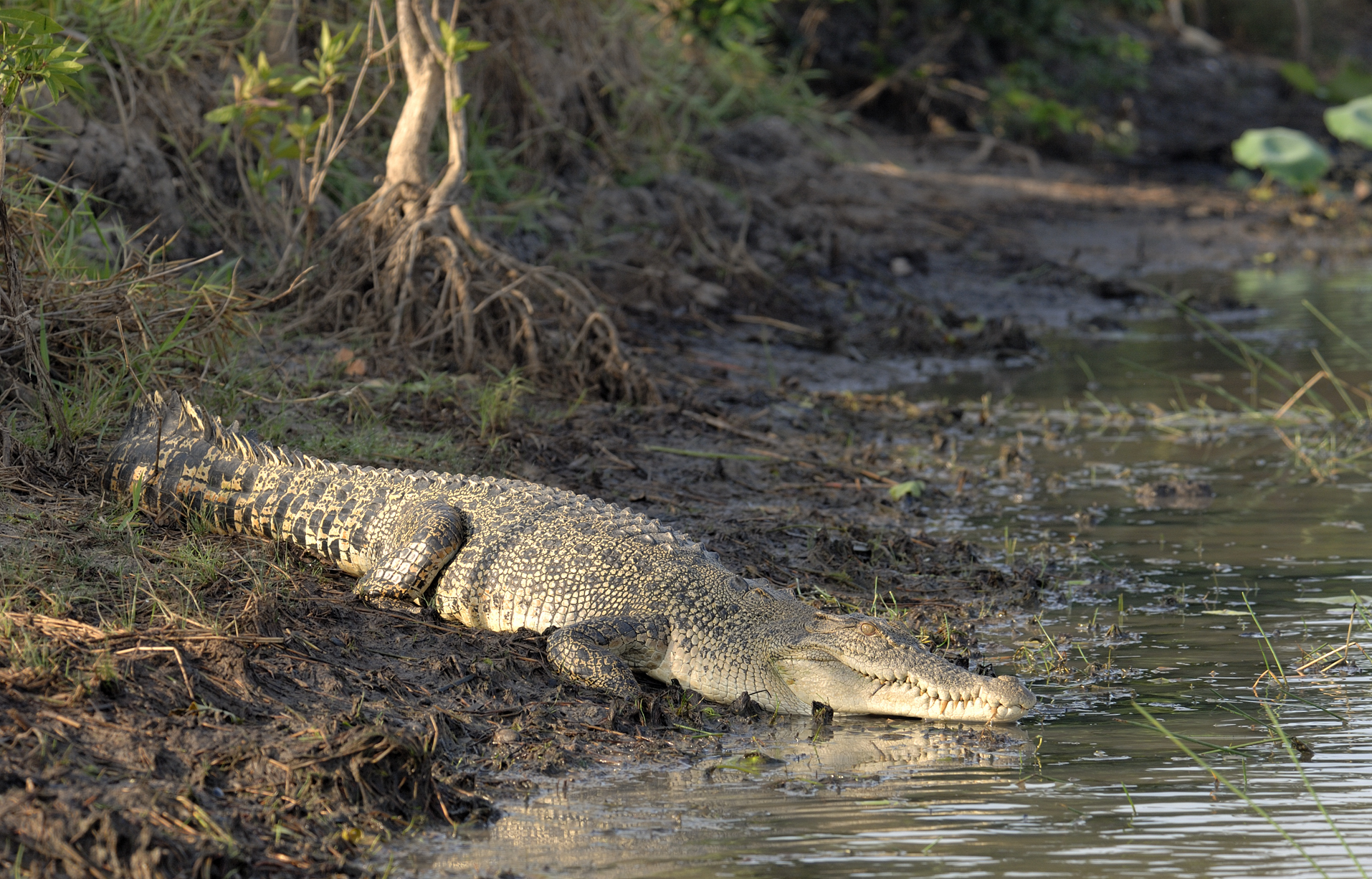
The river has a large population of saltwater crocodiles

The river rises on the western slopes of the Great Dividing Range below Jacks Knob, west of Nundah homestead. The river flows generally north-west through tropical savanna plains and wetlands, joined by fifteen minor tributaries, before reaching its mouth and joining with the Ducie River on the western side of the peninsula at Port Musgrave, just north of Mapoon. Finally, the Wenlock River enters the Gulf of Carpentaria and descends 215 metres (705 ft) over its 322-kilometre (200 mi) course. The total catchment size is 7,526 square kilometres (2,906 sq mi).

The river has no water storage facilities built on it and there is little development within the drainage basin, resulting in a low population. In 2010, the Queensland Government declared the river a "wild river", one of thirteen Queensland rivers that are free of dams, weirs, irrigation schemes and industrial development, and remain largely intact.

Much of the river is bordered by gallery rainforests which provide habitat for animals such as the white-tailed rat, spotted cuscus and palm cockatoo. During the wet season the river floods, replenishing the wetlands. With some 48 species, the river contains the highest diversity of freshwater fish of all Australian rivers, many of which are shared with the rivers of southern New Guinea. They include Buffon's river garfish and fimbriate gudgeon, as well as the freshwater sawfish and more common species such as the sooty grunter, saratoga and barramundi. The river is also home to one of Queensland’s largest breeding populations of the saltwater crocodile.

Originally named the Batavia River, the river was renamed in 1939, reportedly in honour of Baron Wenlock.

== See also ==
- List of rivers of Australia § Queensland
- Wenlock Goldfield
