= Mpalitjanh dialect =

Extinct Pama–Nyungan language of Australia

Mpalityan
- Native to: Australia
- Region: Cape York Peninsula, Queensland
- Ethnicity: Winduwinda
- Extinct: by 1960s
- Language family: Pama–Nyungan: Paman; North Cape York; Northern; Luthigh; Mpalityan

Language codes
- ISO 639-3: xpj Mpalitjanh
- Glottolog: mpal1238
- AIATSIS: Y25

Mpalityan (Mpalitjanh) is an Australian language once spoken in the Cape York Peninsula of Queensland. It and Luthigh are dialects of a single language.

== Phonology ==
=== Consonants ===
	Peripheral		Laminal		Apical
	Bilabial	Velar	Palatal	Dental	Alveolar
Plosive	p	k	c	t̪	t
Fricative	β	ɣ		ð	
Prenasalised stop	ⁿp	ⁿk	ⁿc	ⁿt̪	ⁿt
Nasal	m	ŋ	ɲ	n̪	n
Vibrant					r
Approximant	w		j		l

=== Vowels ===
	Front	Back
High	i	u
Low	æ	a
