= Uradhi language =

Australian Aboriginal language

Uradhi
- Injinoo Ikya
- Native to: Australia
- Region: Cape York Peninsula, Queensland
- Ethnicity: Injinoo (Ankamuti, Wuthathi (Otati = Mutjati), Yinwum, Atampaya, Yadhaykenu)
- Extinct: 1990s
- Revival: 2015
- Language family: Pama–Nyungan: Paman; North Cape York; Northern; Uradhi
- Dialects: Yinwum

Language codes
- ISO 639-3: urf – inclusive code Uradhi; Individual codes: amz – Atampaya avm – Angkamuthi yxm – Yinwum
- Glottolog: urad1238 Uradhic wuth1237 Wuthathi yinw1236 Yinwum
- AIATSIS: Y184 Uradhi, Y238 Injinoo Ikya (identical to Uradhi), Y7 Angkamuthi, Y183 Atambaya, Y8 Yadhaykanu
- ELP: Uradhi
- Atampaya

Urradhi is a Paman language of the Cape York Peninsula of Queensland, Australia, and is apparently extinct. It forms a group of closely related and highly mutually intelligible dialects, these being Urradhi on the coast to the south-west, spoken by the Urradhi people; Angkamuthi to the west north of Urradhi; Utudhanamu inland north from Atampaya, Yantaykenu further north, being the language of the Bamaga area; Yadhaykenu on the east coast north of Wudhadhi; and Yaraytyana further north again. (Adyinuri/Itinadyana may have been another.) The language has no common name, though 'Urradhi' is commonly used as a cover term. Speakers of the Angkamuthi, Atambaya and Yadhaykanuuse dialects use the term Injinoo Ikya to refer to their language.

The Urradhi dialects are closely related to the Gudang language (Pantyinamu/Yatay/Gudang/Kartalaiga and other clan names), formerly spoken on the tip of Cape York.

The traditional language region includes north of Mapoon and Duyfken Point and east of the coast strip to the north of Port Musgrave (Angkamuthi country) incorporating the mouth of the Ducie River, the lower reaches of the Dulhunty River and the upper reaches of the Skardon River in the north. Following the displacement of Indigenous people by British settlement, it was also spoken in the Northern Peninsula Area Region including the communities of New Mapoon, Injinoo and Cowal Creek.

== Dialects ==
Urradhi proper is the south-western dialect of the language. The name is composed of urra "this" and the proprietive dhi "having".

The south-eastern dialect of the Wuthathi people, also spelled Wudhadhi, is made of the same elements, with wudha being "this". It went extinct in the 1910s.

There are a few partial speakers of the inland dialect of Atampaya.

== Phonology ==
Following the sound inventory of the Uradhi dialect. See Yinwum dialect for the inventory of that variety, which may be treated as a distinct language.

=== Vowels ===
Uradhi has seven phonemic vowels:

	Front	Back
	Unrounded	Rounded
Close	i iː	u uː
Mid	e	
Open	a aː	

=== Consonants ===
Uradhi has 18 consonants:

	Peripheral		Laminal		Apical	
	Bilabial	Velar	Palatal	Dental	Alveolar	Retroflex
Plosive	p	k	c	t̪	t	
Nasal	m	ŋ	ɲ	n̪	n	
Fricative	β	ɣ		ð		
Trill					r	
Approximant	w		j		l	ɻ
