= Ducie River =

River in Queensland, Australia

Ducie
- Location of Ducie River mouth in Queensland
- Etymology: In honour of the Earl of Ducie

Location
- Country: Australia
- State: Queensland
- Region: Far North Queensland

Physical characteristics
- Source: Richardson Range, Great Dividing Range
- Source confluence: Palm Creek and South Palm Creek
  - location: west of Bramwell Roadhouse
  - coordinates: 12°06′47″S 142°25′08″E
  - elevation: 30 m (98 ft)
- Mouth: Gulf of Carpentaria
  - location: Port Musgrave
  - coordinates: 12°03′S 142°01′E
  - elevation: 0 m (0 ft)
- Length: 69 km (43 mi)
- Basin size: 6,746 km^{2} (2,605 sq mi)

Basin features
- Tributaries
  - right: Dulhunty River

The Ducie River is a river on the Cape York Peninsula in Far North Queensland, Australia.

Formed by the confluence of the Palm Creek and South Palm Creek, the headwaters of the Ducie River drain the Richardson Range, part of the Great Dividing Range. The river flows generally west through stringybark woodlands, tropical savanna plains and wetlands. It enters the Gulf of Carpentaria on the western side of the Cape York Peninsula at Port Musgrave just north of Mapoon. The river descends 31 metres (102 ft) over its 69-kilometre (43 mi) course.

The catchment covers 6,746 square kilometres (2,605 sq mi); there are no major towns or water storage facilities in the watershed.

Much of the river is bordered by gallery rainforest. In its lower reaches it supports an extensive tidal mangrove forest with stands of Nipa Palms.

== History ==
Luthigh (also known as Lotiga, Tepiti and Uradhi, see also Uradhi related languages) is an Australian Aboriginal language spoken by the Luthigh people. The traditional language area for Luthigh includes landscape within the local government boundaries of the Cook Shire: Eastern Cape York, Ducie River, Northern Peninsula, New Mapoon, Injinoo, and Cowal Creek.

Teppathiggi (also known Tepithiki and Teyepathiggi) is an Australian Aboriginal language of the Western Cape York, Middle Dulcie River, Lower Batavia River, Ducie River, and Mapoon. The language region includes areas within the local government boundaries of Cook Shire Council.

Uradhi (also known as Anggamudi, Ankamuti, Atampaya, Bawtjathi, and Lotiga) is an Australian Aboriginal language of the Western Cape York Peninsula. The traditional language region includes north of Mapoon and Duyfken Point and east of the coast strip to the north of Port Musgrave (Angkamuthi country) incorporating the mouth of the Ducie River, the lower reaches of the Dulhunty River and the upper reaches of the Skardon River in the north. Following the displacement of Indigenous people by British settlement, it was also spoken in the Northern Peninsula Area Region, including New Mapoon, Injinoo and Cowal Creek communities.

The river was named in 1886 by Francis Lascelles Jardine, a pastoralist, reportedly after the Earl of Ducie, presumably a relative of the Jardine family.

== See also ==
- List of rivers of Australia § Queensland
