= Duyfken Point =

Duyfken Point is a point in the locality of Mission River, Shire of Cook, Queensland, Australia (12.5722°S 141.6014°E).

== Geography ==
Duyfken Point is on the western coast of Cape York Peninsula on the Gulf of Carpentaria.

== History ==
Duyfken Point was named by Matthew Flinders on 8 November 1802 after the ship Duyfken commanded by the Dutch explorer Willem Janszoon. It is claimed that Janszoon was the first European to sight the Australian coast in the Gulf of Carpentaria in 1606, 164 years before Lieutenant James Cook sailed up the east coast of Australia.

Uradhi (also known as Anggamudi, Ankamuti, Atampaya, Bawtjathi, and Lotiga) is an Australian Aboriginal language of the Western Cape York Peninsula. The traditional language region includes north of Mapoon and Duyfken Point and east of the coast strip to the north of Port Musgrave (Angkamuthi country) incorporating the mouth of the Ducie River, the lower reaches of the Dulhunty River and the upper reaches of the Skardon River in the north. Following the displacement of Indigenous people by British settlement, it was also spoken in the Northern Peninsula Area Region including the communities of New Mapoon, Injinoo and Cowal Creek.
