= New Mapoon, Queensland =

New Mapoon
- Town
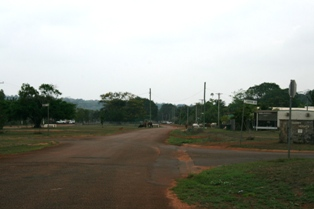

- Interactive map of New Mapoon
- Coordinates: 10.8662°S 142.3863°E
- Country: Australia
- State: Queensland
- LGAs: Northern Peninsula Area Region; Shire of Torres
- Location: 397 km (247 mi) NNE of Weipa; 838 km (521 mi) NNW of Cooktown; 1,007 km (626 mi) NNW of Cairns; 2,661 km (1,653 mi) NW of Brisbane

Government
  - State electorate: Cook
  - Federal division: Leichhardt

Area
  - Total: 137.8 km^{2} (53.2 sq mi)

Population
  - Total: 412 (2021 census)
  - Density: 2.990/km^{2} (7.744/sq mi)
- Time zone: UTC+10:00 (AEST)
Localities around New Mapoon
Torres Strait	Punsand	Somerset
Torres Strait	New Mapoon	Bamaga
Seisia	Umagico	Bamaga

New Mapoon is a town in the Northern Peninsula Area Region and coastal locality split between the Northern Peninsula Region and Shire of Torres, Queensland, Australia. In the 2021 census, the locality of New Mapoon had a population of 412 people.

The people who live at New Mapoon were forcibly moved from Marpuna in the early 1960s to accommodate mining expansion on their traditional country. They now have historical association and administrative responsibility for a DOGIT area on the traditional country of the Gudang people. The residents of New Mapoon have a ranger service, which works closely with the Injinoo and other Northern Peninsula Area (NPA) community rangers to undertake land management practices in the NPA.

== Geography ==
New Mapoon is an area south of Seisia and west of Bamaga at the tip of Cape York Peninsula, adjoining the Lockerbie Scrub.

New Mapoon is 1 of the 5 communities that form the Northern Peninsula Area (NPA). The NPA consists of 1,030 square kilometres (400 sq mi) in the northernmost region of Cape York in far north Queensland. Injinoo, Umagico, Seisia and Bamaga communities make up the remainder of the NPA.

== History of New Mapoon ==
Luthigh (also known as Lotiga, Tepiti and Uradhi, see also Uradhi related languages) is an Australian Aboriginal language spoken by the Luthigh people. The traditional language area for Luthigh includes landscape within the local government boundaries of the Cook Shire: Eastern Cape York, Ducie River, Northern Peninsula, New Mapoon, Injinoo, and Cowal Creek.

Uradhi (also known as Anggamudi, Ankamuti, Atampaya, Bawtjathi, and Lotiga) is an Australian Aboriginal language of the Western Cape York Peninsula. The traditional language region includes north of Mapoon and Duyfken Point and east of the coast strip to the north of Port Musgrave (Angkamuthi country) incorporating the mouth of the Ducie River, the lower reaches of the Dulhunty River and the upper reaches of the Skardon River in the north. Following the displacement of Indigenous people by British settlement, it was also spoken in the Northern Peninsula Area Region including the communities of New Mapoon, Injinoo and Cowal Creek.

=== European contact ===
New Mapoon is located near Bamaga, and was initially called Hidden Valley. The site was also locally known as Charcoal Burner or Mandingu. The government established New Mapoon to accommodate residents from Mapoon Mission, some of whom accepted an offer to relocate there following the closure of Mapoon Mission (Old Mapoon) in July 1963.

Mapoon Mission was established under the name Batavia River Mission at Cullin Point in 1891 by the Presbyterian Church of Australia on the traditional lands of the Tjungundji people. Its residents included the Tjungundji, descendants of other local language groups whose lands were incorporated into the Mapoon Aboriginal reserve over time, people forcibly removed to the mission from the Gulf of Carpentaria area and descendants of South Sea Islanders brought to the mission by Presbyterian missionaries.

In 1954, the Presbyterian Church and Department of Native Affairs attended a conference at Mapoon to discuss the mission's future. Director of Native Affairs, Cornelius O’Leary, rejected the Presbyterian Church's proposal to maintain the mission and a policy decision was made to close the mission. Other problems at Mapoon had also been brought to his attention prior to the conference including financial and staffing difficulties, and resident dissatisfaction. O’Leary had already advised the government of his preference to close the mission before attending the conference.

Residents of Mapoon were not consulted about the closure of Mapoon and most protested strongly against the initial plan to relocate residents to other Presbyterian missions or to "assimilate those ready for exemption [from the Protection Acts] into the Australian way of life elsewhere".

At the time the community became aware of the closure plan in 1954, around 285 people lived at Mapoon. The church administration did not commit to the government's closure policy until 1960, after experiencing persistent pressure caused by under-funding and uncertainty after the discovery of bauxite deposits in the Mapoon-Weipa area in 1955.

Between 1961 and 1962, the Presbyterian Church began deliberately reducing services to mission residents. The government had begun to build houses at New Mapoon. By July 1963, the last Presbyterian staff member had resigned, the Department of Native Affairs had appointed one of its staff as Superintendent of Mapoon and around 100 Mapoon residents had relocated to New Mapoon. At the end of 1962, around 162 people still remained at Mapoon continuing their campaign against the closure and setting up alternative schooling, food supplies and transport.

The Queensland Government reported in May 1963 that the "balance of the inhabitants of Mapoon of their own volition moved to New Mapoon". However, the official records indicate that this was not the case. On 14 November 1963, the Director of Native Affairs, Patrick Killoran, instructed the Thursday Island police to remove 23 people from Mapoon to Bamaga and "commence demolition of the vacated shanties on the reserve". The next night, two Queensland police officers arrived at Mapoon on the MV Gelam, together with several Saibai Island Community Police officers. A police report of the event has never been located; however oral accounts and removal records confirm that all residents were removed and that some of the buildings and houses were burned at Mapoon at this time.

The bulk of the demolition of the Mapoon mission occurred in mid-1964. Presbyterian Church records indicate that the remaining 70 residents at Mapoon were transported to Weipa and New Mapoon aboard the MV Gelam between January and May 1964

After the 1964 closure of Mapoon, former residents continued to lobby for the re-opening of their community. In 1974, Jerry and Ina Hudson and several other families returned to 'old Mapoon' and in 1984, established the Marpuna Aboriginal Corporation which gradually built up community facilities.

=== Local government and Deed of Grant in Trust community ===
On 30 March 1985, the New Mapoon community elected 5 councillors to constitute the New Mapoon Aboriginal Council established under the Community Services (Aborigines) Act 1984. The Act conferred local government type powers and responsibilities upon Aboriginal councils for the first time. Umagico, Seisia, Cowal Creek and Bamaga also elected council representatives at this time.

On 27 October 1986, the New Mapoon council area, previously an Aboriginal reserve held by the Queensland Government, was transferred to the trusteeship of the New Mapoon Aboriginal Council under a Deed of Grant in Trust (DOGIT) lease.

On 1 January 2005, the New Mapoon Aboriginal Council became the New Mapoon Aboriginal Shire Council. In 2007, the Local Government Reform Commission recommended that the 3 NPA Aboriginal councils and the 2 NPA Torres Strait Islander councils be abolished and a Northern Peninsula Area Regional Council be established in their place. The first Northern Peninsula Area Regional Council (NPARC) was elected on 15 March 2008 in elections conducted under the Local Government Act 1993.

== Demographics ==
In the 2016 census, the locality of New Mapoon had a population of 383 people.

In the 2021 census, the locality of New Mapoon had a population of 412 people.

== Education ==
There are no schools in New Mapoon. The nearest government primary and secondary schools are the junior and senior campuses of the Northern Peninsula Area State College, both of which are in neighbouring Bamaga to the south-east.

== Amenities ==
Northern Peninsula Area Regional Council operates a library (New Mapoon Indigenous Knowledge Centre) at Brown Street, New Mapoon.

The New Mapoon Indigenous Knowledge Centre (IKC) opened on 16 August 2002. It was the first IKC established in the Northern Peninsula Area and the fourth established in Queensland. The IKC Administrator Pauline Lifu has been with the IKC for most of its 20-year history and is the longest-serving staff member in the IKC network. Ms Lifu has been at the forefront of developing a local history collection at the IKC, which includes material from all five Northern Peninsula Area communities: Bamaga, Injinoo, New Mapoon, Seisia, and Umagico.

New Mapoon has a general store, "Arts and Craft", and "Bait and Tackle" shops.
