= Injinoo, Queensland =

Injinoo
- Town
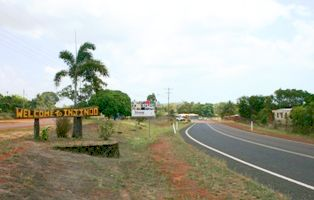
- Injinoo, Cape York, Australia.

- Interactive map of Injinoo
- Coordinates: 10.9062°S 142.3255°E
- Country: Australia
- State: Queensland
- LGAs: Northern Peninsula Area Region; Shire of Torres
- Location: 7.5 km (4.7 mi) WSW of Bamaga; 463 km (288 mi) NNE of Weipa; 822 km (511 mi) NNW of Cooktown; 991 km (616 mi) NNW of Cairns; 2,663 km (1,655 mi) NNW of Brisbane

Government
  - State electorate: Cook
  - Federal division: Leichhardt

Area
  - Total: 181.4 km^{2} (70.0 sq mi)
- Elevation: 14 m (46 ft)

Population
  - Total: 498 (2021 census)
  - Density: 2.745/km^{2} (7.110/sq mi)
- Time zone: UTC+10:00 (AEST)
- Postcode: 4876
Localities around Injinoo
Torres Strait	Torres Strait	Umagico
Gulf of Carpentaria	Injinoo	Jardine River
Gulf of Carpentaria	Mapoon	Jardine River

Injinoo (formerly Cowal Creek) is a coastal town in the Northern Peninsula Area Region and a locality split between the Northern Peninsula Area Region and the Shire of Torres in Far North Queensland, Australia. It is on the north-western coast of Cape York Peninsula. In the 2021 census, the locality of Injinoo had a population of 498 people with 449 (90.25%) identifying as Indigenous Australians.

== History ==
Luthigh (also known as Lotiga, Tepiti and Uradhi, see also Uradhi related languages) is an Australian Aboriginal language spoken by the Luthigh people. The traditional language area for Luthigh includes landscape within the local government boundaries of the Cook Shire: Eastern Cape York, Ducie River, Northern Peninsula, New Mapoon, Injinoo, and Cowal Creek.

Uradhi (also known as Anggamudi, Ankamuti, Atampaya, Bawtjathi, and Lotiga) is an Australian Aboriginal language of the Western Cape York Peninsula. The traditional language region includes north of Mapoon and Duyfken Point and east of the coast strip to the north of Port Musgrave (Angkamuthi country) incorporating the mouth of the Ducie River, the lower reaches of the Dulhunty River and the upper reaches of the Skardon River in the north. Following the displacement of Indigenous people by British settlement, it was also spoken in the Northern Peninsula Area Region including the communities of New Mapoon, Injinoo and Cowal Creek.

Injinoo Aboriginal Community was an Aboriginal settlement and later Anglican mission established on Cape York by a community led by a Wuthathi man, Allelic Whitesand.

Although self-sufficient, through fishing and gardening, the Community made requests to the then Church of England to establish a mission and school. Queensland government officials allowed the community to function through an elected Council.

After the Second World War, which saw a considerable military presence in the area, many Torres Strait Islanders began moving into Injinoo. Settlements were subsequently built at Bamaga, New Mapoon and Umagico to relocate evicted people from this and other areas of the Cape. In 1948 a reserve was created, with control of the area having been taken over by the Queensland Department of Native Affairs.

The official name of the community was changed from Cowal Creek to Injinoo on 2 September 1989.

== Demographics ==
In the 2006 census, the town of Injinoo had a population of 416 people with 398 (95.7%) identifying as Indigenous.

In the 2016 census, the locality of Injinoo had a population of 561 people with 535 (95.9%) identifiying as Indigenous.

In the 2021 census, the locality of Injinoo had a population of 498 people with 449 (90.25) identifying as Indigenous.

== Education ==
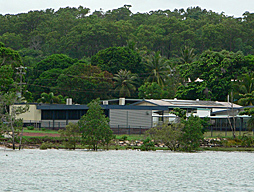
Injinoo junior campus, as seen from Cowal Creek, 2024

The Injinoo Junior campus of the Northern Peninsula Area College is a government primary (Early Childhood-6) campus of Northern Peninsula Area State College at Bowie Street (10.9057°S 142.3228°E). The college has its headquarters in Bamaga to the north-east.

There are no secondary schools in Injinoo. The nearest government secondary school is the Senior Campus of the Northern Peninsula Area College in Bamaga to the north-east.

== Facilities ==
In 2012, the Indigenous Knowledge Centre was opened at Injinoo, operated by the Northern Peninsula Area Regional Council. It has produced a video detailing traditional bush foods as part of a children's language workshop.
