= Mutee Head =

Headland in Queensland, Australia

Coordinates: 10.90944°S 142.24944°E

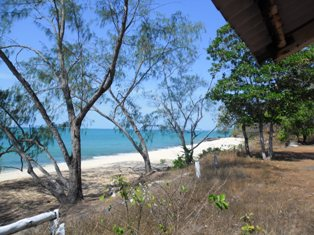
Mutee Head

Mutee Head is a headland about 20 km west of Bamaga at the north of Cape York Peninsula in the Shire of Torres, Queensland, Australia.

== History ==
In 1943 during World War II, the RAAF built a radar station at Mutee Head, known as RAAF 52 Radar Station. It closed in September 1945 and the buildings were given to the people of Saibai Island. It is historically significant as it is the only Queensland radar station with its radar tower and aerial still intact and in situ.
