= Northern Peninsula Area Region =

Coordinates: 10°53′16″S 142°23′16″E

- Local government area
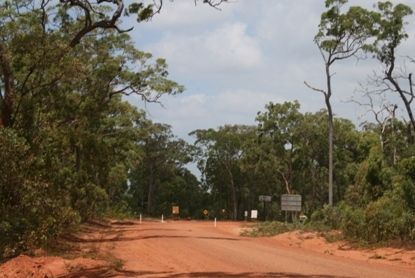
- One bend from Jardine River Ferry crossing - the entrance to the Northern Peninsula Area

- Interactive map of Northern Peninsula Area Region
- Country: Australia
- State: Queensland
- Region: Far North Queensland
- Established: 2008
- Council seat: Bamaga

Government
  - Mayor: Patricia Yusia
  - State electorate: Cook
  - Federal division: Leichhardt

Area
  - Total: 1,052 km^{2} (406 sq mi)

Population
  - Total: 2,781 (2021 census)
  - Density: 2.6435/km^{2} (6.847/sq mi)
- Website: Northern Peninsula Area Region
LGAs around Northern Peninsula Area Region
Torres	Torres	Coral Sea
Gulf of Carpentaria	Northern Peninsula Area Region	Coral Sea
	Cook

The Northern Peninsula Area Region is a local government area in Far North Queensland, Australia, covering areas on the northwestern coast of Cape York Peninsula. It was created in March 2008 out of three Aboriginal Shires and two autonomous Island Councils during a period of statewide local government reform.

In the 2021 census, the Northern Peninsula Area Region had a population of 2,781 people.

== History ==
Luthigh (also known as Lotiga, Tepiti and Uradhi, see also Uradhi related languages) is an Australian Aboriginal language spoken by the Luthigh people. The traditional language area for Luthigh includes landscape within the local government boundaries of the Cook Shire: Eastern Cape York, Ducie River, Northern Peninsula, New Mapoon, Injinoo, and Cowal Creek.

Uradhi (also known as Anggamudi, Ankamuti, Atampaya, Bawtjathi, and Lotiga) is an Australian Aboriginal language of the Western Cape York Peninsula. The traditional language region includes north of Mapoon and Duyfken Point and east of the coast strip to the north of Port Musgrave (Angkamuthi country) incorporating the mouth of the Ducie River, the lower reaches of the Dulhunty River and the upper reaches of the Skardon River in the north. Following the displacement of Indigenous people by British settlement, it was also spoken in the Northern Peninsula Area Region including the communities of New Mapoon, Injinoo and Cowal Creek.

The Region was created on 15 March 2008 from five previous entities—the Bamaga and Seisia Island Councils, and the Injinoo, New Mapoon and Umagico Aboriginal Councils. Its first election was held on the same day.

In 1984, the Community Services (Torres Strait) Act and Community Services (Aborigines) Act were enacted by the Queensland Government, allowing community councils to be created to own and administer former reserves or missions under a Deed of Grant in Trust (DOGIT). Each was responsible for local basic utilities and services such as electricity, housing and management of local CDEP programs. They also worked with the Queensland Police to provide for community police officers—hence extending well beyond the normal functions of local government. The Local Government (Community Government Areas) Act 2004 extended to community councils many of the provisions and benefits of the Local Government Act 1993 normally enjoyed by shire councils.

In 2006, the councils were involved in a consultation process which resulted in a Green Paper being produced. The State Government subsequently took over the process, and in April 2007, a White Paper entitled "Community Government in the Torres Strait: the way forward" was released, recommending both governance and structural changes to ensure the sustainability of governance in the region. The White Paper expressed concerns about workload and capacity to meet community needs, deficiencies in corporate governance and accountability and other challenges and issues. The Local Government Reform report in July 2007 recommended the creation of the Northern Peninsula Area council as well as the Torres Strait Island Region council to attempt to address these issues. The Queensland Government responded by proposing the Local Government and Other Legislation (Indigenous Regional Councils) Amendment Bill 2007 to bring the two new councils into line with the recommendations of both reports.

Because of the unique structure of the DOGIT areas, where a community owned the land and the council represented the community owners, concerns were raised by the councils about ownership potentially transferring to the new entities and diluting their title over it. Some councils responded by creating a private company with all community members as shareholders, and transferring the ownership to the company. This was opposed by the State Government who threatened to take legal action against the communities.

Following the elections, the Department of Local Government provided $675,000 to the Regional Council to assist with expenses relating to the post-amalgamation transfer process.

Gudang (Gootung) is one of the languages of the tip of Cape York. The Gudang language region includes the landscape within the local government boundaries of the Northern Peninsula Area Regional Council, particularly the localities of Somerset, Albany Island and Newcastle Bay extending north to the Tip.

== Demographics ==
In the 2016 census, the Northern Peninsula Area Region had a population of 2,796 people.

In the 2021 census, the Northern Peninsula Area Region had a population of 2,781 people.

== Structure ==
The council consists of five divisions, each of which represents one of the former entities and elects one councillor, with a mayor being elected by the entire region. At the 2008 election, the following councillors were elected:

- Mayor – Joseph Elu
- Division 1 (Injinoo) – Gina Nona
- Division 2 (Umagico) – Peter Lui
- Division 3 (Bamaga) – Reg Williams
- Division 4 (New Mapoon) – Michael Bond
- Division 5 (Seisia) – Jeffrey Aniba

The 2012 local government elections saw a completely new set of councillors elected. All sitting councillors who recontested their seats - the Mayor and Councillors from Division 1, 3 and 4 - were defeated. The following councillors were elected:

- Mayor – Bernard Charlie
- Division 1 (Injinoo) – Anthony Mara
- Division 2 (Umagico) – Dennis Gatawan (unopposed)
- Division 3 (Bamaga) – Edward Newman
- Division 4 (New Mapoon) – Trevor Lifu
- Division 5 (Seisia) – Benjamin Gebadi

The most recent local government elections on 16 March 2024 saw the following councillors elected:

- Mayor – Robert Poi Poi
- Division 1 (Injinoo) – David Byrne
- Division 2 (Umagico) & Deputy Mayor – Mary Yoelu
- Division 3 (Bamaga) – Kitty Gebadi
- Division 4 (New Mapoon) – Marlene Bond
- Division 5 (Seisia) – Bradford Elu

== Mayors ==
- 2008–2012: Joseph Benjamin Elu
- 2012–2016: Bernard Charlie
- 2016–2020: Eddie Newman
- 2020–2024: Patricia Yusia
- 2024–present: Robert Poi Poi

== Towns and localities ==
The Northern Peninsula Area Region includes the following settlements and their populations:

- Bamaga – 1164
- Injinoo – 561
- New Mapoon – 383
- Seisia – 260
- Somerset – 0
- Umagico – 427

== Language ==
Yumplatok (also known as Torres Strait Creole and Broken) is a contemporary Torres Strait Island language spoken in the Torres Strait. The contact with missionaries and others since the 1800s has led to the development of a pidgin language, which transitioned into a creole language and now has its own distinctive sound system, grammar, vocabulary, usage and meaning. Torres Strait Creole is spoken by most Torres Strait Islanders and is a mixture of Standard Australian English and traditional languages. It is an English-based creole; however, each island has its own version of creole. Torres Strait Creole is also spoken on the Australian mainland, including Northern Peninsula Area Region and coastal communities such as Cairns, Townsville, Mackay, Rockhampton and Brisbane.

== Libraries ==
The Northern Peninsula Area Regional Council operate Indigenous Knowledge Centres at Bamaga, Injinoo, New Mapoon, Seisia and Umagico.

Seisia Indigenous Knowledge Centre (IKC) opened on 2 September 2005, a time when IKCs across the state began embracing innovative technology-based literacy programs. Programs included Have you Heard, a listening station for audiobooks that could accommodate multiple users at one time, and I Can Sing, I Can Read, a program harnessing the fun and popularity of karaoke. Establishing the IKC while technology-based programs were flourishing had a lasting impact. Today, Northern Peninsula Area Regional Council positions the IKC as a technology hub for the region. This evolution was no accident and is thanks to the passion of successive IKC staff advocating for the digital needs of Seisia residents.
