= Luthigh language =

Extinct Australian Aboriginal language

Luthigh
- Pronunciation: [lud̪uɣ]
- Native to: Australia
- Region: Cape York Peninsula, Queensland
- Ethnicity: Lotiga, Tepiti, ?Unjadi
- Extinct: (date missing)
- Language family: Pama–Nyungan: Paman; North Cape York; Northern; Luthigh
- Dialects: Mpalitjanh

Language codes
- ISO 639-3: xpj (Mpalitjanh)
- Glottolog: luth1234
- AIATSIS: Y12 Luthigh, Y25 Mpalitjanh

Luthigh (also known as Luthig, Okara, Winduwinda, Uradhi, Teppathiggi or Ludhigh, pronounced [lud̪uɣ]) is an extinct Paman language formerly spoken on the Cape York Peninsula of Queensland, Australia, by the Luthigh people. It is unknown when it became extinct. It constitutes a single language with Mpalitjanh. According to Sharp (1939), the neighboring Unjadi language differed only marginally from that spoken by the Okara [Luthigh].

== Phonology ==
Consonant phonemes
	Peripheral		Laminal		Apical	Glottal
	Bilabial	Velar	Palatal	Dental	Alveolar	Glottal
Plosives	p	k	c	t̪	t	ʔ
Fricatives	β	ɣ		ð		
Nasals	m	ŋ	ɲ	n̪	n	
Vibrant					r	
Approximants	w		j		l	

Vowel phonemes
	Front	Back
High	i	u
Low	æ	a
