= Tepiti =

Indigenous tribe of Queensland

The Tepiti (Debidigh) or Teppathiggi were an Aboriginal Australian tribe of Queensland. They may be the same as the Lotiga (Luthigh).

== Country ==
The Tepiti controlled some 400 square miles (1,000 km^{2}) of territory on the middle Ducie River.

== Alternative names ==
- Tepithiki
- Teyepathiggi, Teppathiggi
- ? Teepani

== Sources ==
- Tindale, Norman Barnett (1974). "Tepiti (QLD)". Aboriginal Tribes of Australia: Their Terrain, Environmental Controls, Distribution, Limits, and Proper Names. Australian National University.
