= Bamaga =

- Town
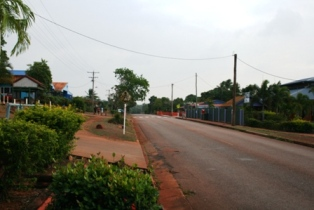
- Main street of Bamaga

- Interactive map of Bamaga
- Coordinates: 10.8879°S 142.3888°E
- Country: Australia
- State: Queensland
- LGA: Northern Peninsula Area Region
- Location: 469 km (291 mi) NNE of Weipa; 828 km (514 mi) NNW of Cooktown; 997 km (620 mi) NNW of Cairns; 2,669 km (1,658 mi) NNW of Brisbane

Government
  - State electorate: Cook
  - Federal division: Leichhardt

Area
  - Total: 66.2 km^{2} (25.6 sq mi)
- Elevation: 36.0 m (118.1 ft)

Population
  - Total: 1,186 (2021 census)
  - Density: 17.915/km^{2} (46.40/sq mi)
- Time zone: UTC+10:00 (AEST)
- Postcode: 4876
Localities around Bamaga
| New Mapoon | New Mapoon | Somerset |
| New Mapoon | Bamaga | Somerset |
| Umagico | Umagico | Somerset |

Bamaga (English: /ˈbæməɡə/ BAM-ə-gə, Kala Lagaw Ya: [ˈbamaɡa]) is an Indigenous town and locality about 40 kilometres (25 mi) from the northern tip of Cape York in the north of Queensland, Australia. It is within the Northern Peninsula Area Region. It is one of the northernmost settlements in continental Australia and is the administrative centre for the Northern Peninsula Area Regional Council.

In the 2021 census, the locality of Bamaga had a population of 1,186 people.

== History ==
The original site for the township of Bamaga was at a site known as "Muttee Heads" some 20 kilometres (12 mi) south of the present Bamaga township. The present site was established after World War II by people from Saibai Island in Torres Strait, after Saibai Island was devastated by abnormally high tides. It is named after Saibai elder Bamaga Ginau, who envisaged the site but died before it was established.

In 1947, the Bamaga township was moved to its present site as a result of a need by the founding people for a larger supply of fresh water. With local industries and the Northern Peninsula Airport (on Urradhi traditional land) Bamaga became the administrative centre for the Northern Peninsula Area, which was made up of the three Aboriginal communities of Injinoo, Umagico and New Mapoon, and the Islander communities of Seisia and Bamaga. All five are Deed of Grant in Trust – communities with their own community councils.

Bamaga Post Office opened by September 1951.

Bamaga State School opened on 28 January 1964. On 23 March 2005, it was renamed Northern Peninsula Area State College.

Some 20 years later, another community, "New Mapoon", was established. It was set up for the forced relocation of people of "Old Mapoon" community, located some two hours north by road from the township of Weipa for bauxite mining.

Bamaga State High School opened on 30 January 1973, but closed on 9 December 1994.

== Demographics ==
In the 2006 census, the town of Bamaga had a population of 784 people, of whom 688 (87.8%) identified as Aboriginal and/or Torres Strait Islander people.

In the 2016 census, the locality of Bamaga had a population of 1,164 people, of whom 957 (82.4%) identified as Aboriginal and/or Torres Strait Islander people.

In the 2021 census, the locality of Bamaga had a population of 1,186 people, of whom 929 (78.3%) identified as Aboriginal and/or Torres Strait Islander people.

== Geography ==
Bamaga and the surrounding communities are located north of the Jardine River which supplies the town water.

== Climate ==
Cape York Post Office, Queensland, Australia

Climate chart (precipitation, max. and min. temperature)
| J | F | M | A | M | J | J | A | S | O | N | D |
| 371 30 24 | 353 30 24 | 371 30 24 | 256 30 24 | 69 29 23 | 26 28 22 | 20 28 22 | 9.5 28 22 | 6.4 29 22 | 15 30 23 | 57 31 24 | 195 31 24 |
- █ Average max. and min. temperatures in °C
- █ Precipitation totals in mm
Imperial conversion
| J | F | M | A | M | J | J | A | S | O | N | D |
| 15 86 75 | 14 85 75 | 15 85 75 | 10 85 75 | 2.7 84 73 | 1 83 72 | 0.8 82 71 | 0.4 82 71 | 0.3 83 72 | 0.6 86 73 | 2.2 88 75 | 7.7 87 76 |
- █ Average max. and min. temperatures in °F
- █ Precipitation totals in inches

Bamaga experiences a tropical savanna climate (Köppen: Aw, Trewartha: Awaa), with hot conditions year-round. There is a wet season from mid-November to mid-May, and a dry season from mid-May to mid-November.

Climate data for Cape York Post Office, Queensland, Australia (1887-1955 normals and extremes); 40 m AMSL
| Month | Jan | Feb | Mar | Apr | May | Jun | Jul | Aug | Sep | Oct | Nov | Dec | Year |
|---|---|---|---|---|---|---|---|---|---|---|---|---|---|
| Mean daily maximum °C (°F) | 29.8 (85.6) | 29.6 (85.3) | 29.6 (85.3) | 29.5 (85.1) | 28.8 (83.8) | 28.1 (82.6) | 27.6 (81.7) | 27.8 (82.0) | 28.5 (83.3) | 29.9 (85.8) | 30.9 (87.6) | 30.8 (87.4) | 29.2 (84.6) |
| Daily mean °C (°F) | 26.9 (80.4) | 26.8 (80.2) | 26.7 (80.1) | 26.6 (79.9) | 25.9 (78.6) | 25.2 (77.4) | 24.6 (76.3) | 24.7 (76.5) | 25.4 (77.7) | 26.4 (79.5) | 27.4 (81.3) | 27.5 (81.5) | 26.2 (79.1) |
| Mean daily minimum °C (°F) | 24.0 (75.2) | 23.9 (75.0) | 23.8 (74.8) | 23.7 (74.7) | 23.0 (73.4) | 22.3 (72.1) | 21.5 (70.7) | 21.6 (70.9) | 22.2 (72.0) | 22.9 (73.2) | 23.8 (74.8) | 24.2 (75.6) | 23.1 (73.5) |
| Average precipitation mm (inches) | 370.6 (14.59) | 352.1 (13.86) | 370.9 (14.60) | 255.5 (10.06) | 69.1 (2.72) | 26.1 (1.03) | 19.7 (0.78) | 9.5 (0.37) | 6.4 (0.25) | 14.9 (0.59) | 56.7 (2.23) | 194.6 (7.66) | 1,746.1 (68.74) |
| Average precipitation days (≥ 1.0 mm) | 16.9 | 15.7 | 16.3 | 11.7 | 7.0 | 5.7 | 4.8 | 3.1 | 1.6 | 2.1 | 4.2 | 9.0 | 98.1 |
Source: Australian Bureau of Meteorology (1887-1955 normals and extremes)

== Language ==
The community languages of Bamaga are Kalaw Kawaw Ya, Brokan (Torres Strait Creole), and English, particularly for education and government business.

== Education ==
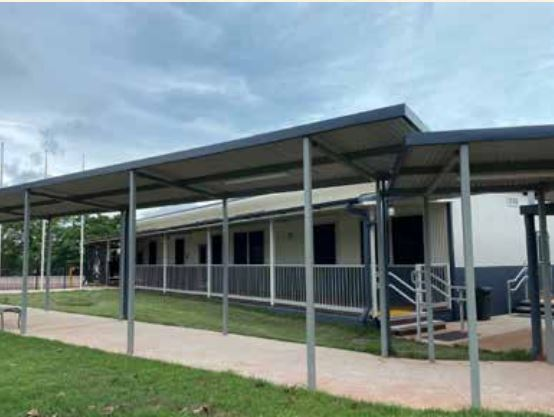
New administration building, Northern Peninsula Area State College, Bamaga junior campus, 2024

Northern Peninsula Area State College is a government primary and secondary (Kindergarten-12) school for boys and girls. In 2018, the school had an enrolment of 634 students with 69 teachers (68 full-time equivalent) and 34 non-teaching staff (24 full-time equivalent). It includes a special education program. The college has its Bamaga senior campus at Sagaukaz Street (10.8952°S 142.3858°E). Its Bagama junior campus is at Anu Street (10.8868°S 142.3901°E). The college has a second junior campus in the town of Injinoo.

The Cape York Campus, a technical and further education (TAFE) college, has been established at Bamaga (10.8954°S 142.3886°E). The campus provides a wide range of tutorial courses including seamanship and other courses.

Northern Peninsula Area Regional Council operates an Indigenous Knowledge Centre at HACC Centre Building in Adidi Street, Bamaga.

== Media ==
Radio stations that broadcast to the town are ABC Far North, Star 102.7, Hit103.5 and Red Dust Country FM, is an Aboriginal-owned community radio station which broadcast from the town.

Bamaga is served by five television stations, three commercial television stations (WIN Television, Seven Queensland and Network 10) which are regional affiliates of the three Australian commercial television networks (10, Seven and Nine), and public broadcasters the ABC and SBS services.

Local newspaper is served by the Cape York Weekly which covers the town.

== Amenities ==
St Stephen's Catholic Church is in Lui Street. It is within the Thursday Island Parish of the Roman Catholic Diocese of Cairns.

== Tourism ==
Muttee Heads is a fishing/camping spot with access to Jardine River mouth and is 30 kilometres (19 mi) west on Cairns road.

== Medical ==
As at 2020, Bamaga Hospital as an establishment has five medical doctors and 14 nurses.

== See also ==
- Torres Strait Islanders
