= Cape York Peninsula =

Peninsula in Far North Queensland, Australia

- Peninsula
- Interactive map of Cape York Peninsula
- Coordinates: 15°S 143°E
- Location: Queensland, Australia
- Offshore water bodies: Coral Sea, Torres Strait, Gulf of Carpentaria

Area
  - Total: 288,804 km^{2} (111,508 sq mi)
- River: Jardine River

The Cape York Peninsula is located in Far North Queensland, Australia. It is the largest wilderness in northern Australia. The land is mostly flat and about half of the area is used for grazing cattle. The relatively undisturbed eucalyptus-wooded savannahs, tropical rainforests and other types of habitat are now recognised and preserved for their global environmental significance. Although much of the peninsula remains pristine, with a diverse repertoire of endemic flora and fauna, some of its wildlife may be threatened by industry and overgrazing as well as introduced species and weeds.

The northernmost point of the peninsula is Cape York. The land has been occupied by a number of Aboriginal Australian peoples for tens of thousands of years. In 1606, Dutch sailor Willem Janszoon on board the Duyfken was the first European to land in Australia, reaching the Cape York Peninsula.

== History ==
=== European exploration ===
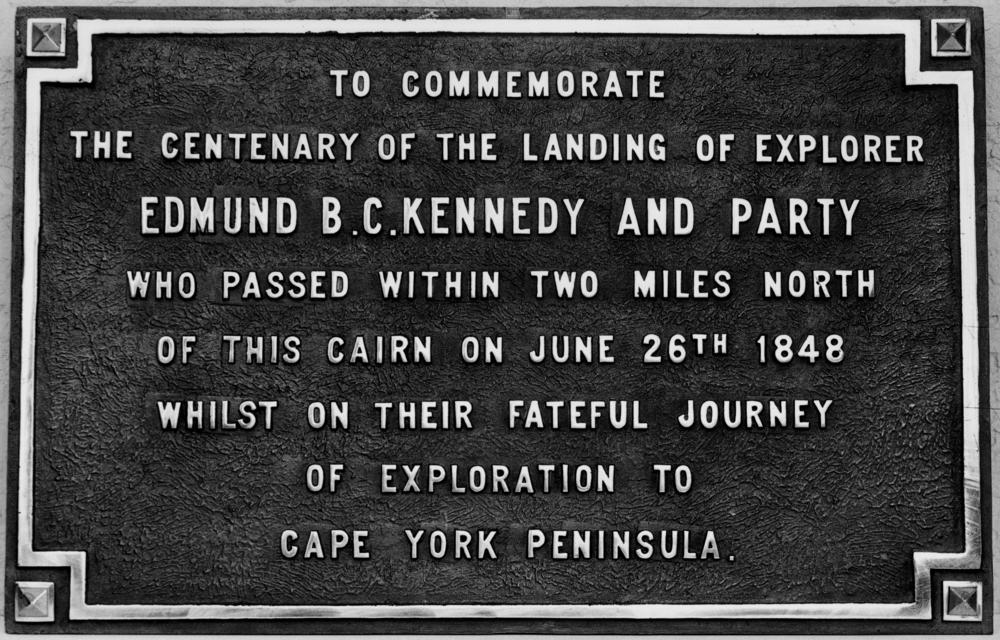
Commemorative stone for Edmund B. C. Kennedy, unveiled at Cardwell, 1948. In 1848, Kennedy, Assistant-Surveyor of New South Wales, led an expedition to explore Cape York Peninsula.

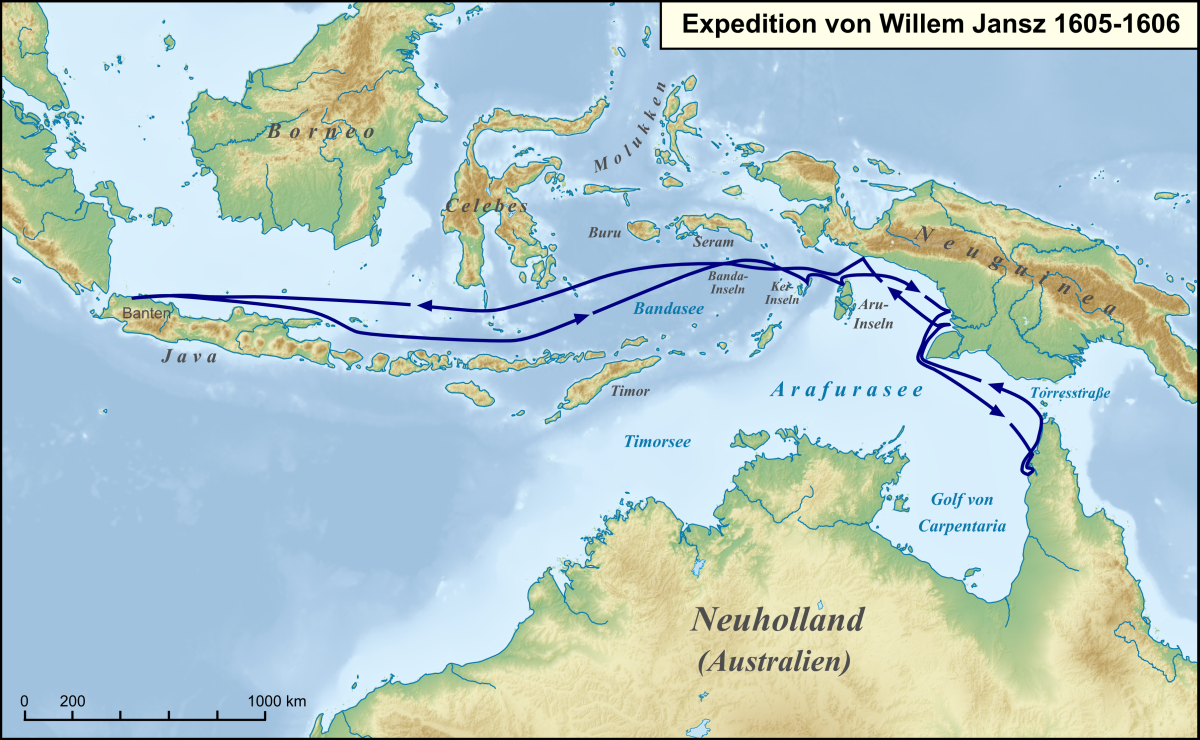
Tour by Willem Jansz with ship Duyfken, in 1605–1606

In February 1606, Dutch navigator Willem Janszoon landed near the site of what is now Weipa, on the western shore of Cape York Peninsula. This was the first recorded landing of a European in Australia, and it also marked the first reported contact between European and Aboriginal Australian people.

Edmund Kennedy was the first European explorer to attempt an overland expedition of Cape York Peninsula. He had been second-in-command to Thomas Livingstone Mitchell in 1846 when the Barcoo River was encountered. The aim was to establish a route to the tip of the peninsula, where Sydney businessmen were attempting development of a port for trade with the East Indies.

The expedition set out from Rockingham Bay near the present town of Cardwell in May 1848, and it turned out to be one of the great disasters of Australian exploration. Of the thirteen men who set out, only three survived. The others died of fever or starvation, or were speared by hostile Aboriginal people. Kennedy died of spear wounds almost within sight of his destination in December 1848. The only survivor to complete the journey was Jackey Jackey, an Aboriginal man from New South Wales. He led a rescue party to the other two who had been unable to continue.

The tip of the peninsula (Cape York) was finally reached by Europeans in 1864 when the brothers Francis Lascelles (Frank) and Alexander William Jardine, along with eight companions, drove a mob of cattle from Rockhampton to the new settlement of Somerset (on Cape York) where the Jardines' father was commander. En route they lost most of their horses, many of their stores and fought pitched battles with Aboriginal people, finally arriving in March 1865.

=== First contact ===
The first known contact between European and Aboriginal people occurred on the west coast of the peninsula in 1606, but it was not settled by Europeans until the 19th century when fishing communities, then stations and later mining towns were established. European settlement led to the displacement of Aboriginal communities and the arrival of Torres Strait Islanders on the mainland.

== Geography and geology ==
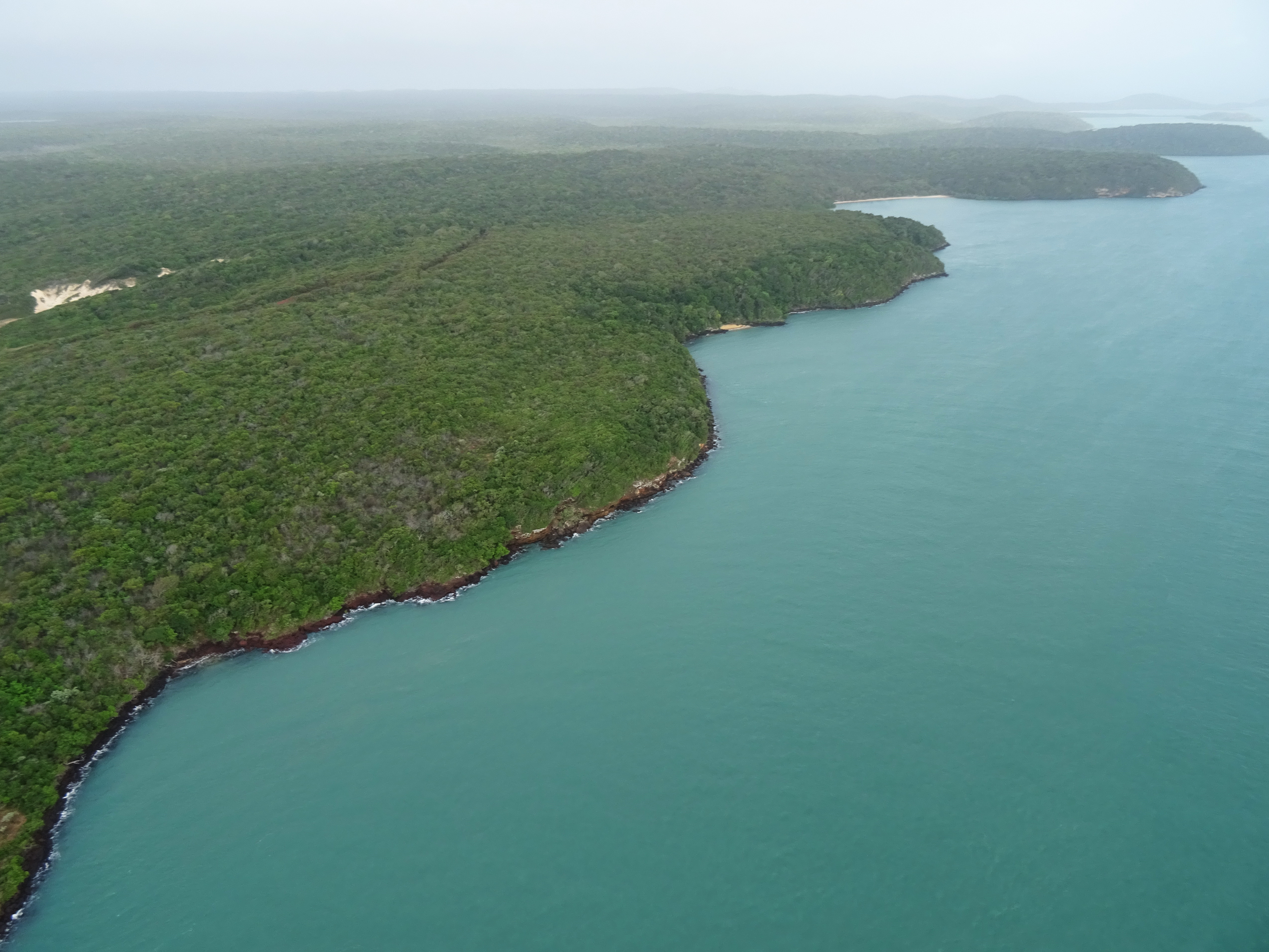
The very tip of Cape York, known as Pajinka, from the air.

The west coast borders the Gulf of Carpentaria and the east coast borders the Coral Sea. The peninsula is bordered by water on three sides (north, east and west). There is no clear demarcation to the south, although the official boundary in the Cape York Peninsula Heritage Act 2007 of Queensland runs along at about 16°S latitude.

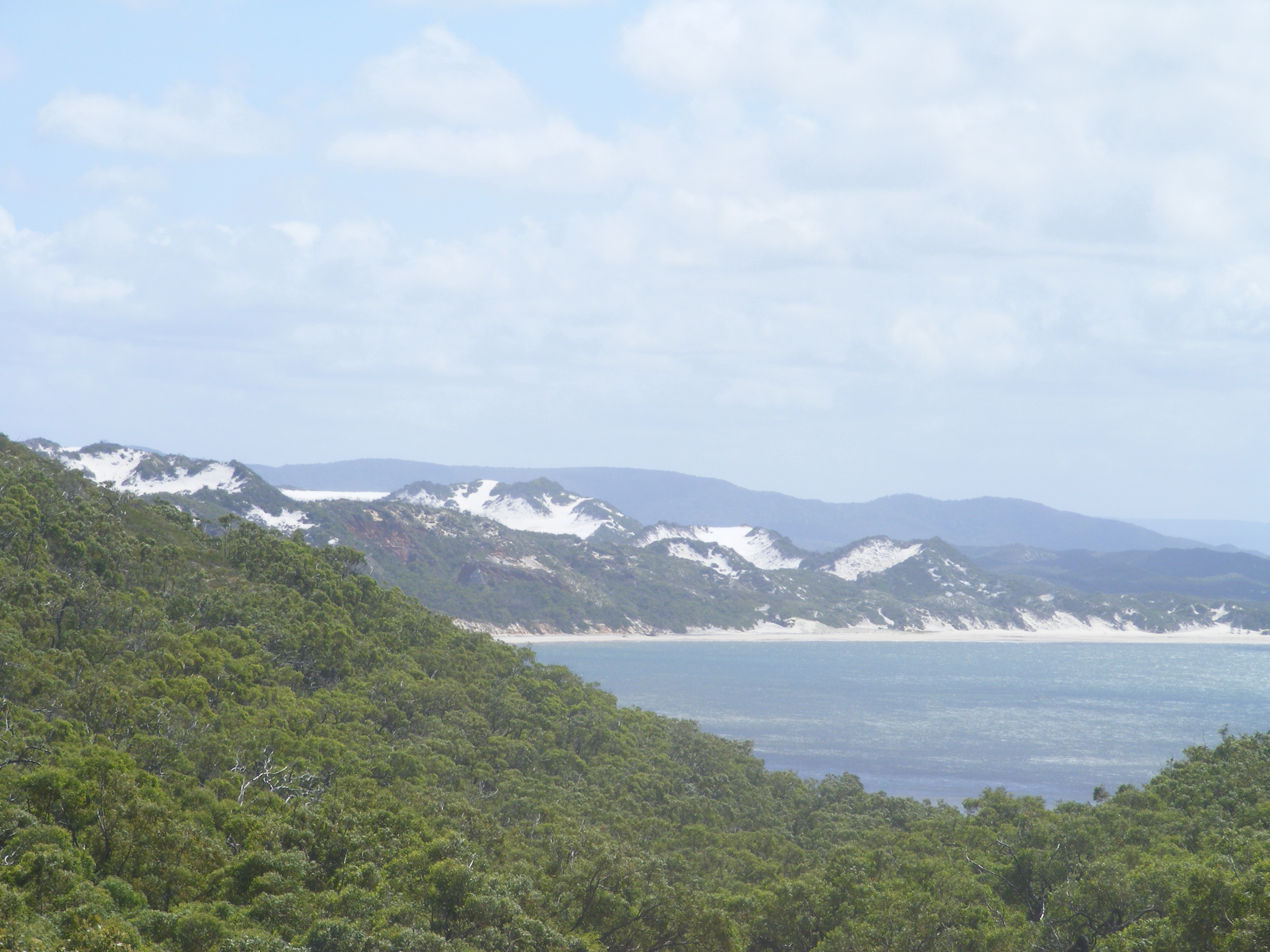
Sand dunes around Cape Flattery.

At the peninsula's widest point, it is 430 km (270 mi) from the Bloomfield River in the southeast, across to the west coast just south of the aboriginal community of Kowanyama. It is some 660 km (410 mi) from the southern border of Cook Shire, to the tip of Cape York.

At the tip of the peninsula lies Cape York, the northernmost point on the Australian mainland. It was named by Lieutenant James Cook on 21 August 1770 in honour of Prince Edward, Duke of York and Albany, a brother of King George III of the United Kingdom, who had died three years earlier:

The point of the Main, which forms one side of the Passage before mentioned, and which is the Northern Promontory of this Country, I have named York Cape, in honour of his late Royal Highness, the Duke of York.

The tropical landscapes are among the most stable in the world. Long undisturbed by tectonic activity, the peninsula is an extremely eroded, almost level low plain dominated by meandering rivers and vast floodplains, with some very low hills rising to 800 m (2,600 ft) elevation in the McIlwraith Range on the eastern side around Coen.

The backbone of Cape York Peninsula is the peninsula ridge, part of Australia's Great Dividing Range. This mountain range is made up of ancient (1.5 billion-year-old) Precambrian and Palaeozoic rocks. To the east and west of the peninsula ridge lie the Carpentaria and Laura Basins, respectively, themselves made up of ancient Mesozoic sediments. There are several outstanding landforms on the peninsula: the large expanses of undisturbed dunefields at the eastern coast around Shelburne Bay and Cape Bedford-Cape Flattery, the huge piles of black granite boulders at Kalkajaka National Park and Cape Melville, and the limestone karsts around Palmerston in the peninsula's far south.

=== Soil ===
The soils are remarkably infertile even compared to other areas of Australia, being almost entirely laterised and in most cases so old and weathered that very little development is apparent today (classified in USDA soil taxonomy as orthents). It is because of this extraordinary soil poverty that the region is so thinly settled: the soils are so unworkable and unresponsive to fertilisers that attempts to grow commercial crops have usually failed.

=== Climate ===
The climate on Cape York Peninsula is tropical savanna in the south, with a heavy monsoon season from November to April, during which time the forest becomes almost uninhabitable, and a dry season from May to October. The temperature is warm to hot, with a cooler climate in higher areas. The mean annual temperatures range from 18 °C (64 °F) at higher elevations to 27 °C (81 °F) on the lowlands in the drier southwest. Temperatures over 40 °C (104 °F) and below 5 °C (41 °F) are rare.

Annual rainfall is high, ranging from over 2,000 mm (79 in) in the Iron Range and north of Weipa to about 700 mm (28 in) at the southern border. Almost all this rain falls between November and April, and only on the eastern slopes of the Iron Range is the median rainfall between June and September above 5 mm (0.2 in). Between January and March, however, the median monthly rainfall ranges from about 170 mm (7 in) in the south to over 500 mm (20 in) in the north and on the Iron Range.

Climate data for Cape York
| Month | Jan | Feb | Mar | Apr | May | Jun | Jul | Aug | Sep | Oct | Nov | Dec | Year |
|---|---|---|---|---|---|---|---|---|---|---|---|---|---|
| Mean daily maximum °C (°F) | 29.8 (85.6) | 29.6 (85.3) | 29.6 (85.3) | 29.5 (85.1) | 28.8 (83.8) | 28.1 (82.6) | 27.6 (81.7) | 27.8 (82.0) | 28.5 (83.3) | 29.9 (85.8) | 30.9 (87.6) | 30.8 (87.4) | 29.2 (84.6) |
| Mean daily minimum °C (°F) | 24.0 (75.2) | 23.9 (75.0) | 23.8 (74.8) | 23.7 (74.7) | 23.0 (73.4) | 22.3 (72.1) | 21.5 (70.7) | 21.6 (70.9) | 22.2 (72.0) | 22.9 (73.2) | 23.8 (74.8) | 24.2 (75.6) | 23.1 (73.6) |
| Average rainfall mm (inches) | 370.6 (14.59) | 352.1 (13.86) | 370.9 (14.60) | 205.5 (8.09) | 49.1 (1.93) | 21.1 (0.83) | 19.7 (0.78) | 9.5 (0.37) | 11.4 (0.45) | 34.9 (1.37) | 156.7 (6.17) | 194.6 (7.66) | 1,794.7 (70.66) |

=== Rivers ===
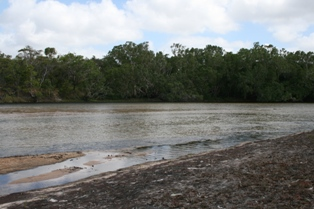
Jardine River, northern Cape York Peninsula, at the base of Cape York itself.

The Peninsula Ridge forms the drainage divide between the Gulf of Carpentaria and the Coral Sea. To the west, a series of large, winding river systems including the Mitchell, Staaten, Coleman, Holroyd, Archer, Watson, Wenlock, Ducie and Jardine catchments empty their waters into the Gulf of Carpentaria. During the dry season, those rivers are reduced to a series of waterholes and sandy beds. Yet, with the arrival of torrential rains in the wet season, they swell to mighty waterways, spreading across extensive floodplains and coastal wetlands and giving life to a vast array of freshwater and wetland species.

On the Eastern slopes, the shorter, faster-flowing Jacky Jacky Creek, Olive, Pascoe, Lockhart, Stewart, Jeannie and Endeavour Rivers flow towards the Coral Sea, providing important freshwater and nutrients to the healthiest section of the Great Barrier Reef. On their way, those wild, undisturbed rivers are lined with dense rainforests, sand dunes or mangroves.

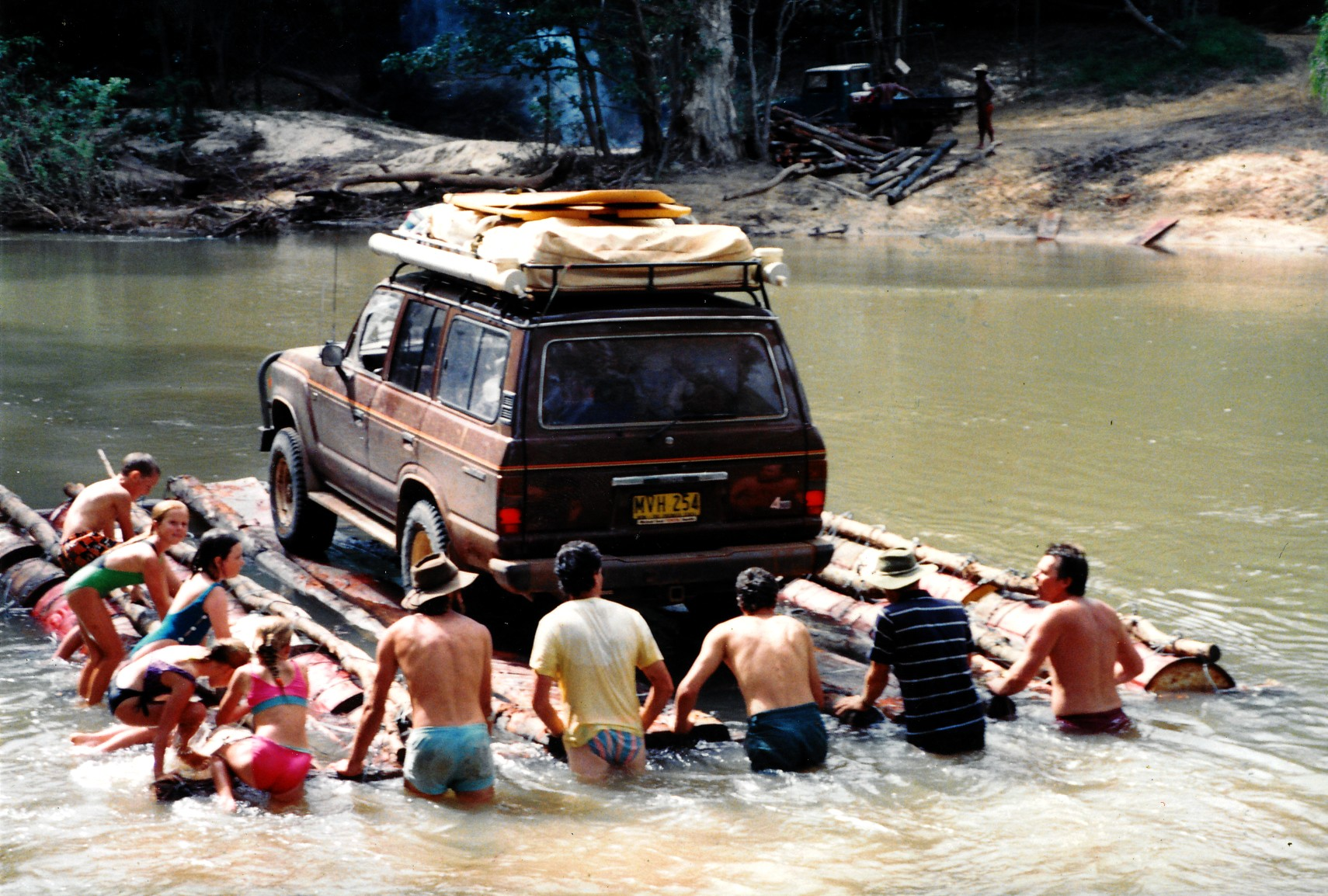
Tourists crossing the Wenlock River in the Wet Season

The floodplains of the Laura Basin, which are protected in the Rinyirru and Jack River National Parks, are crossed by the Morehead, Hann, North Kennedy, Laura, Jack and Normanby Rivers.

The Peninsula's river catchments are noted for their exceptional hydrological integrity. With little disturbance on both water flows and vegetation cover throughout entire catchments, Cape York Peninsula has been identified as one of the few places where tropical water cycles remain essentially intact. Cape York Peninsula contributes as much as a quarter of Australia's surface runoff. Indeed, with only about 2.7 percent of Australia's land area, it produces more run-off than all of Australia south of the Tropic of Capricorn. Tapping those heavy tropical rainfalls, the peninsula's rivers are also of particular importance for replenishing central Australia's Great Artesian Basin. The Queensland Government is currently poised to protect 13 of Cape York Peninsula's wild rivers under the Wild Rivers Act 2005.

=== Geological history ===
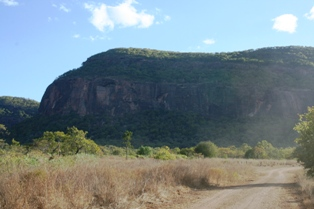
Mount Mulligan, Hodgkinson Goldfields

The peninsula is formed from the northern part of the Great Dividing Range, folded during the Carboniferous period some 300 million years ago, when Australia collided with what is now parts of South America and New Zealand. The range has experienced significant erosion since. Around 40 million years ago, the Indo-Australian tectonic plate began to split apart from the ancient supercontinent Gondwana. As it collided with the Pacific Plate on its northward journey, the high mountain ranges of central New Guinea emerged around 5 million years ago. In the lee of this collision zone, the ancient rock formations of what is now Cape York Peninsula remained largely undisturbed.

Throughout the Pleistocene epoch Australia and New Guinea were alternately land-linked and separated by water. During periods of glaciation and resulting low sea levels, Cape York Peninsula provided a low-lying land link. Another link existed between Arnhem Land and New Guinea, at times enclosing an enormous freshwater lake (Lake Carpentaria) in the centre of what is now the Gulf of Carpentaria. Australia and New Guinea remained connected in this way until the shallow Torres Strait was last flooded around 8,000 years ago.

== People and culture today ==
Today the peninsula has a population of only about 18,000, of which a large percentage (~60%) are Aboriginal people and Torres Strait Islanders.

The administrative and commercial centre for much of Cape York Peninsula is Cooktown, located in its far southeastern corner while the peninsula's largest settlement is the mining town Weipa on the Gulf of Carpentaria. The remainder is extremely sparsely populated, with about half the population living in very small settlements and cattle ranches. Along the peninsula developmental road, there are small service centres at Lakeland, Laura and Coen. About 30 km (19 mi) offshore north of the tip of Cape York, there is a sizeable service centre on nearby Thursday Island. Aboriginal communities are at Hopevale, Pormpuraaw, Kowanyama, Aurukun, Lockhart River, Napranum, Mapoon, Injinoo, New Mapoon and Umagico. Torres Strait Islander communities on the mainland are at Bamaga and Seisia. A completely sealed inland road links Cairns and the Atherton Tableland to Lakeland and Cooktown. The road north of Lakeland Downs to the tip of the peninsula is sometimes cut after heavy rains during the wet season (roughly December to May).

The peninsula is a popular tourist destination in the dry season for camping, hiking, bird watching and fishing enthusiasts. Many people make the adventurous, but rewarding, drive to the tip of Cape York, the northernmost point of mainland Australia.

Some of the world's most extensive and ancient Aboriginal rock painting galleries surround the town of Laura, some of which are available for public viewing. There is also a new interpretive centre from which information on the rock art and local culture is available and tours can be arranged.

=== Indigenous languages and peoples ===
Over 30 Aboriginal languages are spoken on Cape York Peninsula, including Linngithigh, Umpila, Wik Mungkan, Wik-Me'nh, Wik-Ngathan, Kugu Nganhcara, Guugu Yalandji, Guugu Yimithirr, Kuuk Thaayorre and a multitude of Australian Aboriginal sign languages. Some of these languages are being acquired by children or are spoken by all generations in remote communities. Most Wik languages are being quickly absorbed by Wik-Mungkan, which seems to be the only aboriginal language on the peninsula that is developing very quickly, as it is the second language of the Wikalkan, Wik-Ngathana, and Wikngenchera.

Djagaraga (also known as Yadhaigana, Dyagaraga and Yagulleone) is an Australian Aboriginal language from the tip of Cape York. The language region includes the landscape within the local government boundaries of the Northern Peninsula Area Regional Council. Traditionally the language was spoken on Eastern Cape York particularly in the localities of Albany Island and Mount Adolphus Island.

Linngithigh (also known as Winda Winda and Linginiti) is an Australian Aboriginal language spoken by the Linngithigh people. The Linngithigh language region includes landscape within the local government boundaries of the Cook Shire Council: Western Cape York, Winda Winda Creek, Mission River, and Archer River.

Luthigh (also known as Lotiga, Tepiti and Uradhi, see also Uradhi related languages) is an Australian Aboriginal language spoken by the Luthigh people. The traditional language area for Luthigh includes landscape within the local government boundaries of the Cook Shire: Eastern Cape York, Ducie River, Northern Peninsula, New Mapoon, Injinoo, and Cowal Creek.

Teppathiggi (also known Tepithiki and Teyepathiggi) is an Australian Aboriginal language of Western Cape York, Middle Dulcie River, Lower Batavia River, Ducie River, and Mapoon. The language region includes areas within the local government boundaries of Cook Shire Council.

Thaynakwith (also known as Awngthim, Tainikuit and Winduwinda) is an Australian Aboriginal language spoken on Western Cape York in the Weipa area taking in Albatross Bay and Mission River. The language region includes areas within the local government boundaries of Weipa Town Council and Cook Shire.

Uradhi (also known as Anggamudi, Ankamuti, Atampaya, Bawtjathi, and Lotiga) is an Australian Aboriginal language of the Western Cape York Peninsula. The traditional language region includes north of Mapoon and Duyfken Point and east of the coast strip to the north of Port Musgrave (Angkamuthi country) incorporating the mouth of the Ducie River, the lower reaches of the Dulhunty River and the upper reaches of the Skardon River in the north. Following the displacement of Indigenous people by British settlement, it was also spoken in the Northern Peninsula Area Region including the communities of New Mapoon, Injinoo and Cowal Creek.

Yir Yiront (also known as Yiront, Jirjoront, Yir-yiront, and Kokomindjan) is an Australian Aboriginal language. Its traditional language region is in Western Cape York within the local government areas of Aboriginal Shire of Kowanyama and Shire of Cook, in the catchments of the Coleman River and Mitchell River. Following the removal of Aboriginal people from their traditional lands, it is also spoken in Pormpuraaw and Kowanyama.

Kuuku Ya'u (also known as Gugu Yau, Yao, Ya'o, Koko Ya'o and Koka-yao) is an Australian Aboriginal language. The traditional language area of Kuuku Ya'u includes landscape within the local government boundaries of the Cook Shire: Eastern Cape York, Uu'ungun south to Claudie River and hinterland.

Kuuk Thaayorre (also known as Koko-Daiyuri, Kuku Yak, Thayorre, and used as a generic name for several related languages/dialects) is an Australian Aboriginal Language spoken on Western Cape York Peninsula, particularly in the area around Pormpuraaw (Edward River). The Thaayorre language region includes the landscape within Pormpuraaw Community Council and the Cook Shire Council.

Kugu Yi'anh is a language of Cape York. The traditional language area of Kugu Yi'anh includes areas within Cape York.

Kugu Nganhcara (also known as Wik, Wiknantjara, Wik Nganychara, Wik Ngencherr) is a traditional language of the area which includes the landscape within the local government boundaries of the Cook Shire.

Kugu Muminh (also known as Kuku-Muminh) is one of the traditional languages which includes the landscape within the local government boundaries of the Cook Shire.

Kunjen (also known as Koko Wanggara, Ngundjan and Olkola) is a language of Western Cape York. The Kunjen language region includes the landscape within the local government boundaries of Kowanyama Community Council and Cook Shire Council.

=== Native title claims ===
The Cape York Land Council, established in 1990 as a land council, has fought for native title rights, and has won such rights over 45% per cent of the region by around 2018.

On 25 November 2021, 2,188 km^{2} (845 sq mi) of land on the eastern side of the peninsula were handed back to the Kuuku Ya'u and Uutaalnganu peoples, in a native title claim that was lodged seven years prior. The landmark ruling was delivered by Justice Debra Mortimer of the Federal Court of Australia, sitting at the Supreme Court of Queensland in Cairns.

In December 2022 the Federal Court recognised the native title claims for the Kaurareg, Kulkulgal, Kemer Kemer Meriam, Ankamuthi, and Gudang/Yadhaykenu peoples.

== Ecology ==
=== Flora ===
Cape York Peninsula supports a complex mosaic of intact tropical rainforests, tropical and subtropical grasslands, savannahs, shrublands, heath lands, wetlands, wild rivers and mangrove swamps. The savannah woodlands consist typically of a tall dense grass layer and varying densities of trees, predominantly eucalypt of which the most common is Darwin stringybark (Eucalyptus tetrodonta). These various habitats are home to about 3300 species of flowering plants and almost the entire area of Cape York Peninsula (99.6%) still retains its native vegetation and is little fragmented. Although abundant and fully functioning on the peninsula, tropical savannahs are now rare and highly degraded in other parts of the world. Cape York Peninsula also contains one of the highest rates of endemism in Australia, with more than 260 endemic plant species found so far. Therefore, parts of the peninsula have been noted for their exceptionally high wilderness quality.

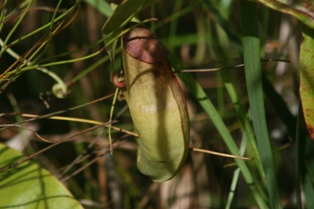
Carnivorous pitcher plant, Cape York Peninsula.

The flora of the peninsula includes original Gondwanan species, plants that have emerged since the breakup of Gondwana and species from Indomalaya and from across the Torres Strait in New Guinea with the most variety being found in the rainforest areas. Most of the Cape York Peninsula is drier than nearby New Guinea which limits the rainforest plants of that island from migrating across to Australia. Tropical rainforests cover an area of 748,000 ha (1,850,000 acres), or 5.6 percent of the total land area of Cape York Peninsula. Rainforests depend on some level of rainfall throughout the long dry season, climatic conditions that are mostly found on the eastern slopes of the peninsula's coastal ranges. Being almost exclusively untouched, old-growth forests and supporting a disproportionately high biodiversity including flora of Gondwanan and New Guinean origin, the rainforests are of high conservation significance. The largest contiguous rainforest area on the peninsula occurs in the McIllwraith Range–Iron Range area. The Gondwanan flora of this area includes Araucariaceae and Podocarpaceae conifers and Arthrochilus, Corybas, and Calochilus orchids. In all, this rainforest contains at least 1000 different plants, including 100 rare or threatened species, and 16% of Australia's orchid species.

On poor, dry soils tropical heathlands can be found. Northeast Cape York Peninsula supports Australia's largest areas of this highly diverse ecosystem.

The extensive wetlands on Cape York Peninsula are "among the largest, richest and most diverse in Australia". 19 wetlands of national significance have been identified, mostly on the large floodplains and in coastal areas. Important wetlands include the Apudthama Complex, Rinyirru systems and the estuaries of the great rivers of the western plains. Many of these wetlands come into existence only during the wet season and support rare or uncommon plant communities.

The peninsula's coastal areas and river estuaries are lined with mangrove forests of kwila and other trees. Australia's largest mangrove forest can be found at Newcastle Bay.

=== Fauna ===
The peninsula harbours an extraordinary biodiversity, with more than 700 vertebrate land animal species of which 40 are endemic. As a result, from its geological history, "the flora and fauna of Cape York Peninsula are a complex mixture of Gondwanan relics, Australian isolationists and Asian or New Guinean invaders" (p. 41). Birds of the peninsula include buff-breasted buttonquail (Turnix olivii), golden-shouldered parrot (Psephotus chrysopterygius), lovely fairywren (Malurus amabilis), white-streaked honeyeater (Trichodere cockerelli), and yellow-spotted honeyeater (Meliphaga notata) while some such as pied oystercatcher are found in other parts of Australia but have important populations on the peninsula. The peninsula is also home to the eastern brown snake, one of the world's most venomous snakes. Mammals include the rodent Cape York melomys, related to the extinct Bramble Cay melomys, which was found only on Bramble Cay in the Torres Strait and confirmed extinct in 2016.

The rainforests of the Kutini-Payamu National Park support species that are also found in New Guinea, including the eclectus parrot and southern common cuscus. Other rainforest fauna includes 200 species of butterfly including 11 endemic butterflies one of which is the huge green birdwing, the green tree python and the northern quoll, a forest marsupial that is now severely depleted from eating the introduced poisonous cane toads.

The riverbanks of the lowlands are home to specific wildlife of their own while the rivers including the Jardine, Jackson, Olive, Holroyd and the Wenlock are rich in fish. The wetlands and coastal mangroves are noted for their importance as a fish nursery and crocodile habitat, providing important drought refuge and finally the Great Barrier Reef lies off the east coast and is an important marine habitat.

=== Threats and preservation ===
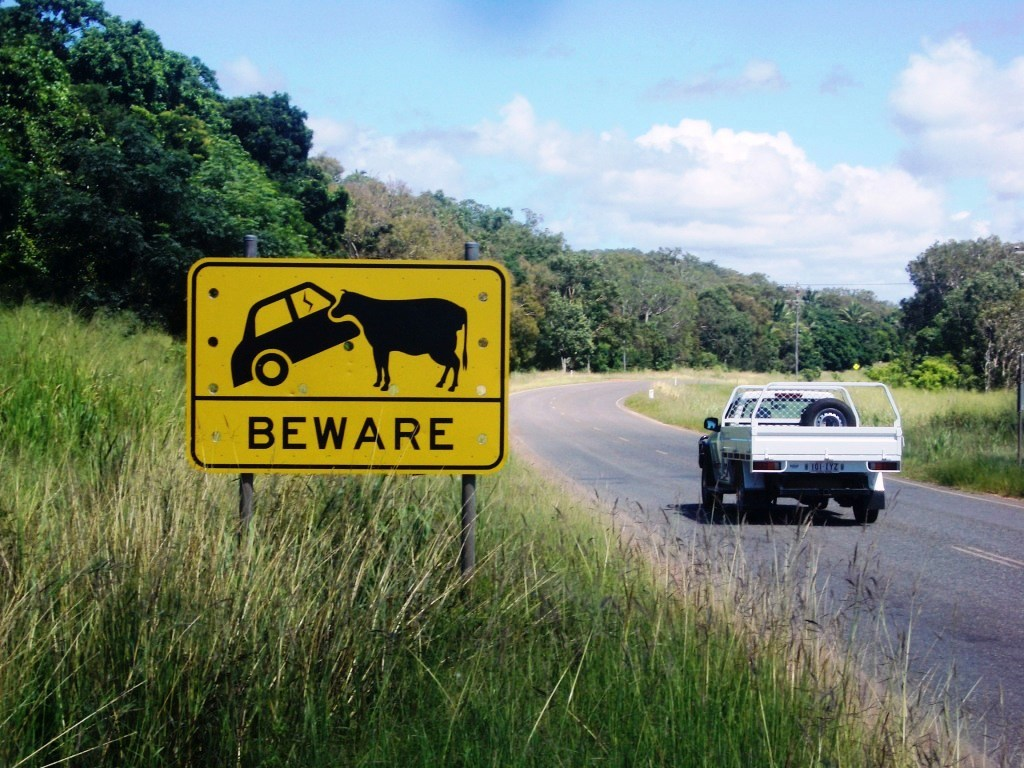
'BEWARE' (presumably of wandering cattle) sign. Cape York Peninsula

Cattle station leases occupy about 57% of the total area, mostly located in central and eastern Cape York Peninsula. Indigenous land comprises about 20%, with the entire West coast being held under native title. The remainder is mostly declared as National Park and managed by the Queensland Parks and Wildlife Service. Land uses include broad-acre pastoralism, bauxite and silica sand mining, nature reserves, tourism and fishing.

There are extensive deposits of bauxite along the west or Gulf of Carpentaria coast. Weipa is the centre for mining. Much has been damaged by overgrazing, mining, poorly controlled fires and feral pigs, cane toads, weeds, and other introduced species but Cape York Peninsula remains fairly unspoilt with intact and healthy river systems and no recorded plant or animal extinction since European settlement.

The "Cape York Peninsula Land Use Strategy" study was commissioned by the Australian government in 1990 to create plans to protect the wilderness and a nomination for World Natural Heritage is currently being considered by the Queensland and Australian Federal governments. Major national parks include the Apudthama National Park in the far north, Oyala Thumotang National Park near Aurukun, and Rinyirru National Park in the southeast of the bioregion. On 16 June 2024, a submission was made for the Cape York Peninsula to be a mixed world-heritage site under the title Cultural Landscapes of Cape York Peninsula.

== Transport ==
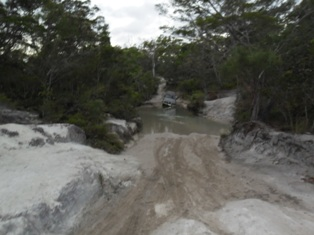
Old Telegraph Track

There are two roads passing north–south through Cape York Peninsula to Cape York: the Peninsula Developmental Road (PDR) and the Northern Peninsula Road (also called Bamaga Road and Telegraph Road).

Bamaga Road now bypasses the overland telegraph line (OTL) track, which is often referred to as the tele track. The tele track was used for construction and maintenance of the OTL until it was superseded by first microwave relay towers and then by fibre optic cables, and is now used by four-wheel drive vehicle enthusiasts in the dry season. Many crossings, such as the bridge over the Wenlock near Moreton station, have been upgraded; however, many fords remain. The roads are unsealed and in places are difficult to traverse. They are considered suitable for four-wheel-drive vehicles only and also considered only suitable to be driven in the dry season.

In 1986, Cape York became the proposed site of a spaceport, which a consortium of companies, the Cape York Space Agency, promoted with support from the federal government. In 1992, investor support failed, and in 2017, legal ownership of 160,000 ha (400,000 acres) of land required was returned to the Wuthathi, Kuku Yau and Northern Kaanju people. The development, which was heavily supported by Queensland premier Joh Bjelke-Petersen, would have included a new town, tourist resorts, an airport and a harbour.

== See also ==
- Geology of Australia

== Bibliography ==
- McIvor, Roy (2010). Cockatoo: My Life in Cape York. Stories and Art. Roy McIvor. Magabala Books. Broome, Western Australia. ISBN 978-1-921248-22-1.
