= Indigenous Knowledge Centre =

Australian library centres

There are two library services operating in Australia that have adopted the appellation "knowledge centre" in relation to the delivery of library services for Indigenous Australian clients. The Northern Territory Library first developed the Indigenous Knowledge Centre model of service and later changed this to Library and Knowledge Centre. The State Library of Queensland continues to use the title Indigenous Knowledge Centre.

== Queensland ==
The State Library of Queensland assists local government to establish Indigenous Knowledge Centres (IKCs). These serve as information hubs for Aboriginal and Torres Strait Islander communities throughout the State.

The State Library of Queensland's IKCs provide the services of a local library, act as a meeting place and provide a safe place to keep important artefacts, artworks and other information within the community. IKCs are a hub for community, providing a place to gather and participate in programs based on community interests including traditional knowledge, culture and languages. Many IKCs provide public Internet access to their communities.

IKCs are place-based, and no two are the same, as they respond to the unique needs of their community and offer a whole cultural precinct wrapped up in one small building. The first seven IKCs opened in 2002, at Lockhart River, Aurukun, Erub, Mabuaig, New Mapoon, Pormpuraaw, and Wujal Wujal. Since then, a number of other centres have opened and now there are 26 across Queensland all created in partnership with Aboriginal and Torres Strait Island shire and regional councils.

== Northern Territory ==
The Northern Territory Library runs a knowledge centre service to its communities under the title of Libraries and Knowledge Centres (formerly known as "Indigenous Knowledge Centres"). In 2007 this program was awarded the Bill and Melinda Gates Access to Learning Award for its innovative use of digital technology in the remote Australian Indigenous community context.

The Northern Territory Library is contributing significant funds to the development of the next generation of Indigenous collection management software.
