= Prince Of Wales, Queensland =

Prince Of Wales
- Suburb
- Interactive map of Prince Of Wales
- Coordinates: 10.7001°S 142.2041°E
- Country: Australia
- State: Queensland
- LGA: Shire of Torres

Government
  - State electorate: Cook

Area
  - Total: 512.1 km^{2} (197.7 sq mi)

Population
  - Total: 62 (2021 census)
  - Density: 0.1211/km^{2} (0.3136/sq mi)
- Time zone: UTC+10:00 (AEST)
- Postcode: 4875
Suburbs around Prince Of Wales
Torres Strait	Thursday Island	Horn
Torres Strait	Prince Of Wales	Punsand
Torres Strait	Torres Strait	Torres Strait

Prince Of Wales is an island locality in the Shire of Torres, Queensland, Australia. In the 2021 census, Prince Of Wales had a population of 62 people.

== Geography ==
The locality consists of a number of islands, the largest two being Prince Of Wales Island (Indigenous name: Muralug Island) and Entrance Island (Indigenous name: Zuna Island).

The town of Muralug is on the north-eastern tip of Prince Of Wales Island.

== History ==
The locality takes its name from Prince Of Wales Island, which in turn was named on 23 August 1770 by Lieutenant James Cook on HMS Endeavour presumably after George Augustus Frederick of Hanover, the then Prince of Wales (later King George IV).

== Demographics ==
In the 2016 census, the locality of Prince Of Wales had a population of 109 people.

In the 2021 census, the locality of Prince Of Wales had a population of 62 people.

== Education ==
There are no schools on the island. Tagai State College on neighbouring Thursday Island to the north is the nearest government primary and secondary school (Early Childhood to Year 12).
