= Lihou (disambiguation) =

Lihou can refer to:

- Lihou, a small island off the coast of Guernsey, in the English Channel
- Lihou Reef National Nature Reserve in the Australian Coral Sea Islands Territory
- Port Lihou Island in the Torres Straits between Australia and Papua New Guinea
