= Keriri Island, Queensland =

Keriri Island
- Suburb
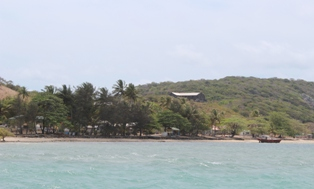
- Keriri Island, 2014

- Interactive map of Keriri Island
- Coordinates: 10.5480°S 142.2058°E
- Country: Australia
- State: Queensland
- LGA: Torres Strait Island Region
- Location: 3.8 km (2.4 mi) N of Thursday Island; 803 km (499 mi) NW of Cairns; 2,189 km (1,360 mi) NW of Brisbane

Government
  - State electorate: Cook
  - Federal division: Leichhardt

Area
  - Total: 15.8 km^{2} (6.1 sq mi)

Population
  - Total: 261 (2021 census)
  - Density: 16.52/km^{2} (42.78/sq mi)
- Time zone: UTC+10:00 (AEST)
- Postcode: 4875
Suburbs around Keriri Island
Torres Strait	Torres Strait	Torres Strait
Torres Strait	Keriri Island	Torres Strait
Torres Strait	Prince of Wales	Thursday Island

Keriri Island is a rural locality in the Torres Strait Island Region, Queensland, Australia. It consists only of the island Hammond Island whose only town is also called Hammond Island. In the 2021 census, Keriri Island had a population of 261 people.

== Geography ==
Hammond Island is the town on the east coast of the island (10.5543°S 142.2188°E).

Bruce Point is a headland just south of the town (10.5596°S 142.2202°E). There are boat launching facilities there.

== History ==
Keriri Island was named as a locality on 2 July 2010.

Hammond Island was probably named after naval office Sir Andrew Snape Hamond by Captain Edward Edwards in September 1791 while travelling to Timor in the boats after the wreck of HMS Pandora.

Bruce Point was named after Robert Gerald Bruce, who worked as a pilot from 1922 to 1964 in the Torres Strait. Following his death 1973, his cremated ashes were scattered at this point.

== Demographics ==
In the 2016 census, Keriri Island had a population of 268 people.

In the 2021 census, Keriri Island had a population of 261 people.

== Education ==
Our Lady of the Sacred Heart School is a private primary (Prep–3) campus at Lot 11 Church Street (10.5494°S 142.2103°E) of Our Lady of the Sacred Heart School headquartered at Thursday Island. Older children take the daily ferry to Thursday Island to attend the main school there.

There are no government schools on Keriri Island. However, Tagai State College (Early Childhood to Year 12) is on neighbouring Thursday Island.
