= Thursday Island Customs House =

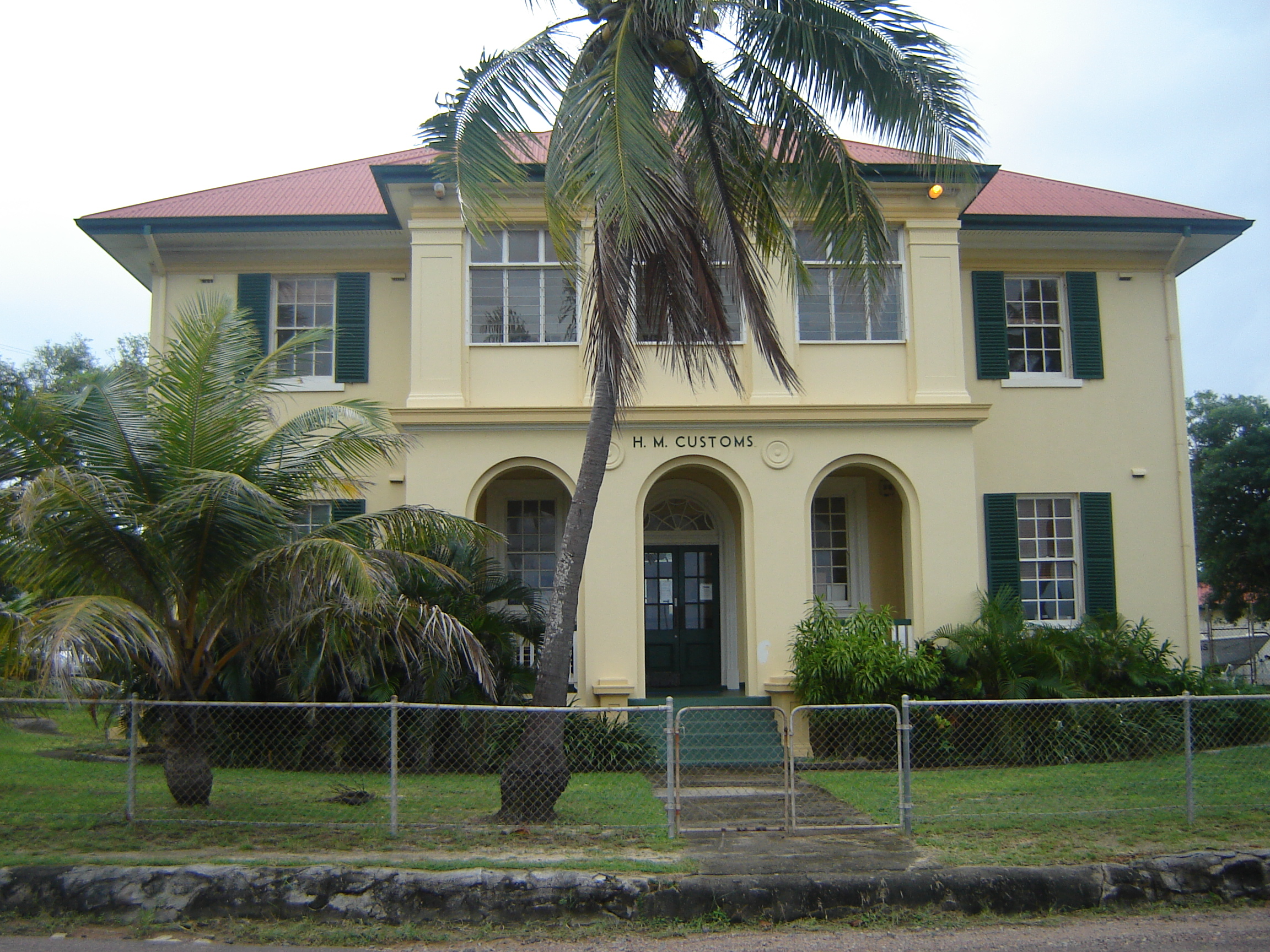
- Thursday Island Customs House, 2006

- Location within Queensland Location within Australia
- 10.5848°S 142.2209°E
- Location: 2 Victoria Parade, Thursday Island, Shire of Torres, Queensland, Australia

History
- Design period: 1919–1930s (interwar period)
- Built: 1938

Site notes
- Architect: Harold Barker
- Architectural style: Georgian

Queensland Heritage Register
- Official name: Thursday Island Customs House
- Type: state heritage (built)
- Designated: 7 February 2005
- Reference no.: 601527
- Significant period: 1938 (fabric); 1942–1945 (historical)
- Significant components: fence/wall – perimeter, cannon, customs house, flagpole/flagstaff, trees/plantings, garden – ornamental/flower

Thursday Island Customs House is a heritage-listed customs house at 2 Victoria Parade, Thursday Island, Shire of Torres, Queensland, Australia. It was designed by Harold Barker and built in 1938. It was added to the Queensland Heritage Register on 7 February 2005.

== History ==
This two storey masonry and stucco building was constructed on Thursday Island for the Australian Government's Customs Department in 1938. It was designed by the head architect of the Commonwealth Department of Works, Harold Barker, and replaced an earlier customs house built in 1885.

Thursday Island can lay claim to unique long-term historical, cultural and strategic links with the nation's heritage. The island was first known as "Waiben Island" to the indigenous people of the region, who did not permanently inhabit the island to any great extent. Europeans first visited the area in March 1606, in the Dutch ship "Duyfken". A Spanish voyage visited soon after, followed by Captain Cook, Bligh and Flinders in the late eighteenth and early nineteenth centuries.

The islands in the Torres Strait were annexed by the colonial government of Queensland in 1872. The northernmost town on the mainland at the time was Somerset, established in 1861. This settlement was abandoned in 1877 in favour of a settlement on Thursday Island. There was great hope for growth of this settlement as it was a vital link in the shipping routes between Australia and Asia and England, and served the pearl-luggers and the beche-de-mere harvesters which thrived in the area. There is also evidence that the settlement was established to provide a government presence in the region to stall imperialist tendencies of the Germans and the French in the late nineteenth century.

It was of strategic importance at this time, for the colonial government (and later the Federated colonies) to establish a chain of customs control points at all the main harbours along the coastline. The customs service was responsible for the collection of duties in Australia, which provided funds for the necessary infrastructure in the early settlements. Each of the colonies were furnished with a Customs service upon responsible government from the 1850s and onwards, which provided an important source of revenue, including the imposition of duties on goods traded between colonies. The collection of Customs was consequently central to the development of the colonial governments, and was an important mechanism by which the colonies conducted their affairs. Upon Federation the collection of Customs became a Commonwealth responsibility.

Customs service records indicate that in 1877 a "Port of Entry and Clearance" was gazetted at Thursday Island on 24 November. Mr H.M. Chester was appointed Customs Sub-Collector and Harbour Master in 1877 and by 1884 the port was gazetted as a warehouse facility. "The port flourished in its early years and a staff of up to six officers was necessary. In 1885 the first Customs House was erected at a cost of £797. In 1890 the Sub-Collectors residence was built at a cost of £1,076." The building was constructed of timber on a platform on short stumps. It was single storeyed, with a verandah on all sides and contained a public counter and "long room" office, a private Sub-Collectors office and a public office with cashiers window. This Customs House was located on the corner of Douglas and Hastings streets. Accommodation for a growing staff was provided by removing four cottages from Sea Hill near Rockhampton to Thursday Island in 1895. A Tidewaiters cottage was built in 1897.

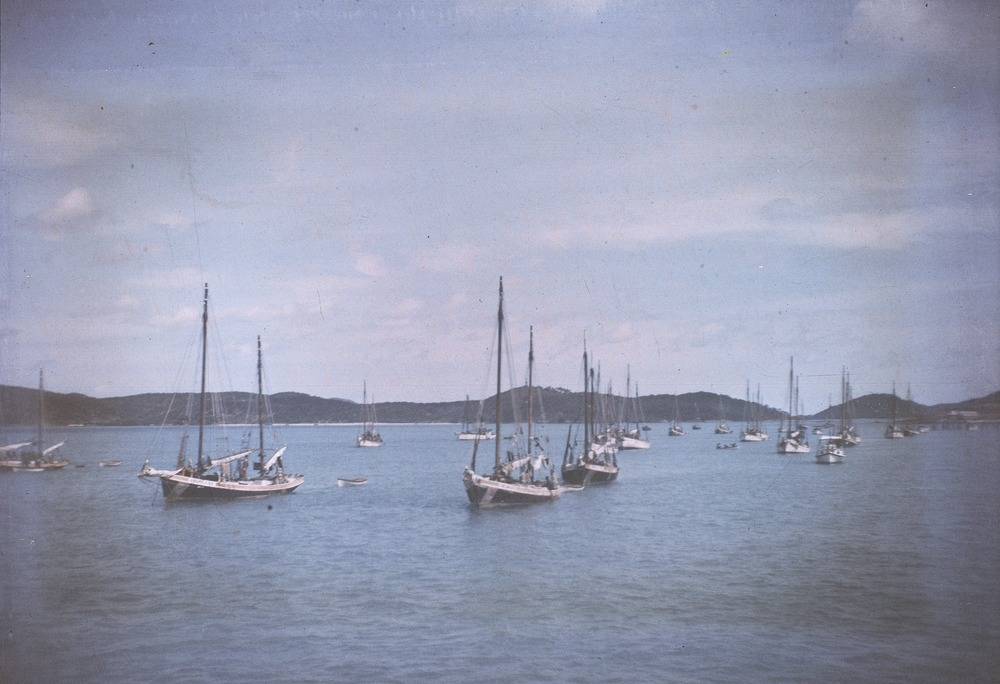
Pearling luggers at Thursday Island, 1939

The main activity in the port was pearl handling. There were numerous Asian and Japanese pearl luggers active in the waters of Torres Strait and it was the customs officers' duty to track and control these and the many trading vessels which stopped at Port Kennedy to refuel with coal, trade and bring immigrants. The ports activities can be gauged from the fact that revenue for the financial year 1879/80 was £2,493 while twenty years later in 1899/1900 it had grown to £19,411. After World War I, the pearling industry quickly returned to its former activity level with sixty luggers active in the Strait. Customs records show reference to "... the important port of Thursday Island, with its timber Customs House, provided a major gateway to Australia, often being the first port of call for ships from Asia."

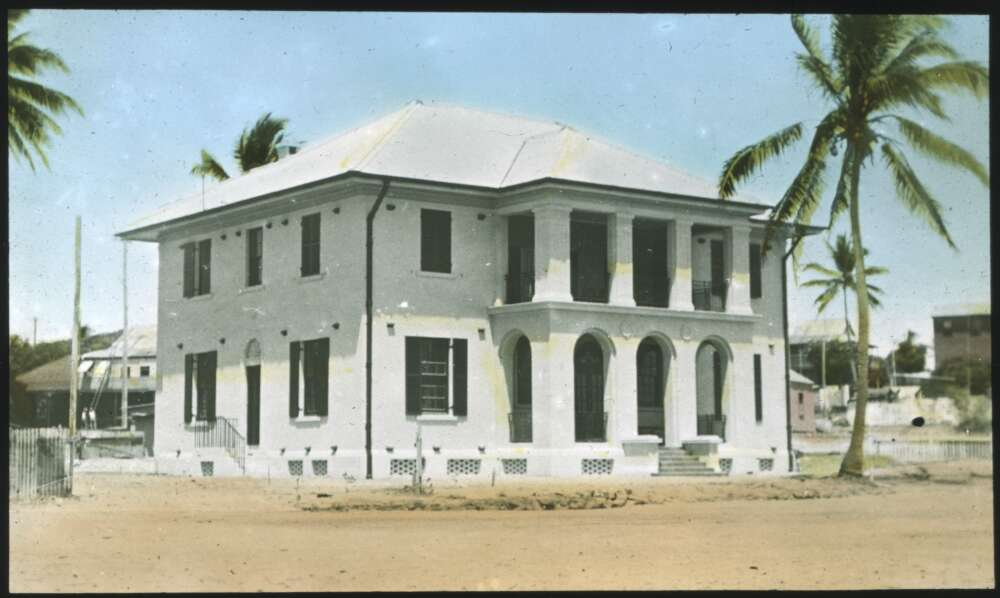
Customs House, possibly during construction in 1938

In 1938 the importance of the port was confirmed once again when a new two storey Customs House was erected. Built of brick and concrete, its ground floor served as the customs office while the second storey served as the sub-collectors residence. The building cost £9,860 and was one of the most prominent landmarks on the island. It was located on the land directly beside the original timber customs house which was then removed.

Shortly after construction of the new customs house in 1939, war was declared. At the end of January 1942, Thursday Island was evacuated of its non-essential inhabitants. Stores were closing and the Customs officers now had to "do our own cooking, housework, washing, messages if we require anything, nothing is delivered." Gauld reported that "the office work has fallen to practically nil and will probably remain at that from now on." Late in 1942 the military, now in command of the Torres Strait, took control of the Customs House and used it as the residence for the Commander of the Torres Force for the remainder of World War II.

The Customs House returned to the Customs Service in 1946 when military control of Thursday Island was relinquished. The building had stood empty for some months since the Torres Force Commander left it in 1945. Early in 1946, the Sub-Collector for Cairns, M.J. Ryan, visited Thursday Island to inspect the buildings and general situation. He noted, "[a] number of indentured Malay people continue to live in Thursday Island and the place is often an open door to the East." He was also of the opinion that an officer should be detailed for duty at Thursday Island to look after the Customs interests, perform immigration duties and provide facilities under the Navigation Act and Merchant Shipping Act.

Over the years the Customs Service on Thursday Island has been involved in the various Customs duties as determined by the Governments of the day. During the years since the military's occupation of the building in World War II, the Customs House was used continuously by the Australian Customs Service until it passed out of Commonwealth ownership. The building remains a landmark on the island, being one of the few non-timber buildings constructed there.

== Description ==
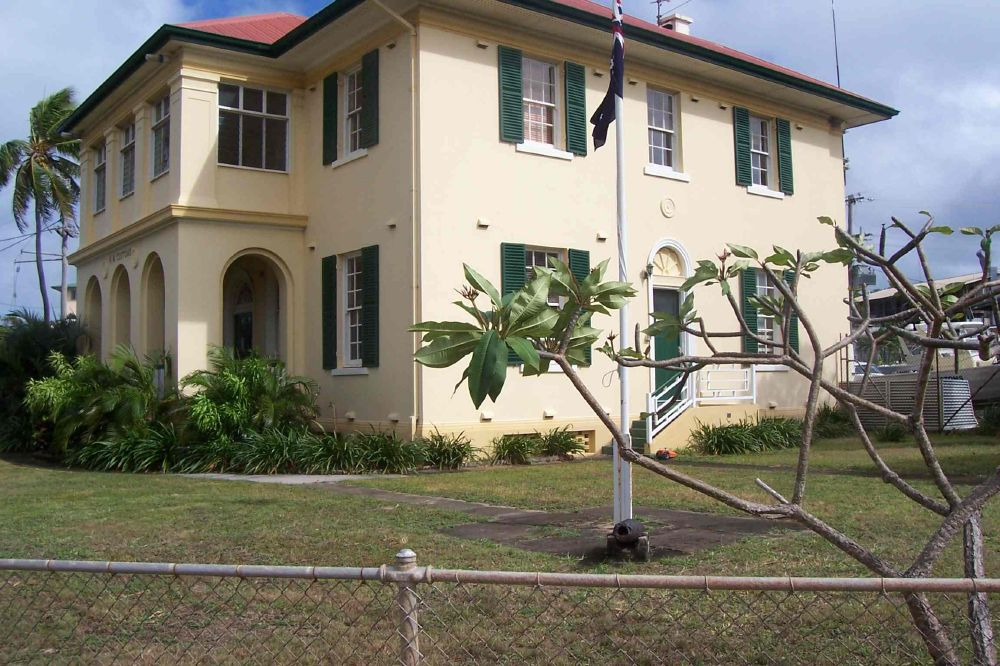
Side view of the Customs House

Thursday Island is one of the many tropical islands in the region known as Torres Strait, lying between the northern tip of Cape York and the New Guinea coast. The Thursday Island Customs House occupies a prominent site in the township of Thursday Island, located on the southern coastline of the island. The Customs House is a two stored masonry building, located fronting Victoria Parade, and bordered by Hastings and Jetty streets. The Government Jetty and Engineers Jetty lie nearby. The building remains a landmark on the island, being one of the few non timber buildings constructed there.

The former Thursday Island Customs House follows the Neo-Georgian style of the 1930s. The double-storey rendered masonry building has projecting balconies at the front and back and a hipped terracotta tile roof, executed on a domestic scale. The windows have timber shutters, a common tropical motif.

The plan form of this building is typical of the customs houses of the late nineteenth and early twentieth century period in Queensland. The focus of the building was the Long Room where business was transacted. This is located in the centre of the ground floor which is entered through the front of the building. Smaller offices are located around this room, including an office for the sub-collector, the person in charge of the operations at the port. On the first floor was the sub-collector's residence, with bedrooms, living areas, and other rooms.

The arcades and balconies fulfilled further purposes apart from satisfying the symmetry and formality desired. Upstairs, the balcony provided a protected yet airy living space, necessary in the tropical climate. Double doorways from the internal rooms often opened onto the balcony, admitting cool breezes. Timber shutters to the openings of the balcony have been installed in the Thursday Island Customs House.

Stripped Classical was a style that retained the important classical elements such as symmetry of massing and elevations, while acknowledging the effect of modernism in design. The buildings of this style were recognisably classical buildings which were however stripped of much of the ornament usually associated with this type of building. Where ornament was applied it was often in the form of Art Deco.

The extent of grounds around the three street frontages of the Customs House allows uninterrupted views of the substantial building, enhancing the status and presentation of the building in the streetscape. The grounds are predominantly flat, comprising open lawns with a few mature trees and a line of tall palms giving added distinction to the substantial building. A concrete path extends from the front entry porch steps straight to a gate in the boundary fence. There is a path along the front of the building. Garden beds fill the space from the base of the walls to this path. The path extends to a small square of concrete paving in the eastern lawn in which a flag pole and small cannon have been placed. Paths extend from the two side entrances to gates at the boundaries.

In massing and proportion, the Thursday Island Customs House is similar to the Cairns Customs House.

== Heritage listing ==
Thursday Island Customs House was listed on the Queensland Heritage Register on 7 February 2005 having satisfied the following criteria.

The place is important in demonstrating the evolution or pattern of Queensland's history.

The former Thursday Island Customs House is important in illustrating the evolution of Queensland's history as it is evidence of an official government activity in a remote location such as Thursday Island. It has further significance as a site of strategic importance to colonial and national governments. The Customs House is also a reflection of the importance of the island as a "gateway" to the colony of Queensland, and later the Commonwealth of Australia.

The place is important in demonstrating the principal characteristics of a particular class of cultural places.

The place is a good example of the stripped Classical style of institutional architecture pursued by the Commonwealth Department of Works in the interwar period.

The place is important because of its aesthetic significance.

The Thursday Island Customs House has aesthetic significance for the quality of its design, in particular the way it accommodates the climate of North Queensland; and for its contribution to the Thursday Island environment as one of the largest buildings, and as one of the few non-timber buildings on the island. The aesthetics of the Thursday Island Customs House is strengthened by its settings, including tropical plantings.
