= Mills Sisters =

Australian singers

- Origin: Torres Strait Islands, Queensland, Australia
- Genres: Folk, blues, reggae
- Years active: 1950s–1996
- Members: Cessa Mills; Ina Mills; Rita Mills

The Mills Sisters, formerly known as the Singing Grandmas, were a group of three sisters from the Torres Strait Islands; Rita Mills and twins Cessa and Ina.

== Early life ==
Ina and Cessa, who were twins, were born in 1927, and Rita in 1934, on Naghir Island in the Torres Strait. They have Torres Strait Islander heritage, including a great-grandmother of the Kaurareg people (the traditional owners of Possession Island, a.k.a. Bedanug), and a grandfather from Samoa. Ina married an Indonesian man from Timor.

Their married names were Cessa Nakata, Ina Titasey, and Rita Fell-Tyrell.

== Career ==
All three sang and Rita played guitar, Cessa the ukulele and Ina the tambourine.

Formerly known as the Singing Grandmas, the group started singing in the 1950s, with their first public appearances in pubs on Thursday Island, and in the 1980s started to tour outside the Torres Strait. They performed at the Brisbane Expo in 1988, the Woodford Folk Festival in Queensland, around Australia, and in the early 1990s toured England, France and New Zealand. They also performed all over the Pacific

Their version of "TI Blues" (a song written by Seaman Dan) has been called "a signature tune for the Torres Strait". In 1995 they released an album, Frangipani Land.

Cessa and Ina retired in 1995 or 1996 and Rita continued on a solo career, until retiring in 2001, and she died in 2004.

== Musical styles and languages ==
The Mills Sisters had a repertoire of over 200 songs, which ranged from Torres Strait Island love songs to contemporary music, and included country, blues, reggae. They sang in many languages besides English: a variety of Samoan, Hawaiian, Papua New Guinean, Aboriginal and Torres Strait Island languages.

== Awards ==
The Australia Council for the Arts has since 1993 awarded a Red Ochre Award to an outstanding Indigenous Australian (Aboriginal Australian or Torres Strait Islander) artist for lifetime achievement. It was awarded to the Mills Sisters in 1995.

== In film ==
The half-hour documentary film Frangipani Land Forever was made by the Australian Broadcasting Corporation's Indigenous department in 2008 in their "Message Stick" series, directed by Douglas Watkin.

== Discography ==
- Frangipani land (1993) - New Market Music
- Those beautiful TI girls (2002) - Zuna Entertainment
