= Horn Island, Queensland =

Horn
- Suburb
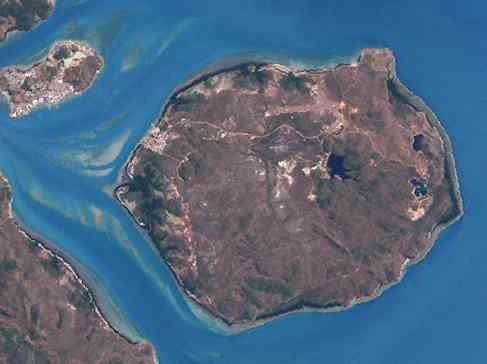
- View of Horn Island from above

- Interactive map of Horn
- Coordinates: 10.6072°S 142.2842°E
- Country: Australia
- State: Queensland
- LGA: Shire of Torres

Government
  - State electorate: Cook
  - Federal division: Leichhardt

Area
  - Total: 202.6 km^{2} (78.2 sq mi)
- Elevation: 4 m (13 ft)

Population
  - Total: 533 (2021 census)
  - Density: 2.6308/km^{2} (6.814/sq mi)
- Time zone: UTC+10:00 (AEST)
- Mean max temp: 30.3 °C (86.5 °F)
- Mean min temp: 24.6 °C (76.3 °F)
- Annual rainfall: 1,809.0 mm (71.22 in)
Suburbs around Horn
Thursday Island	Torres Strait	Torres Strait
Prince Of Wales	Horn	Torres Strait
Prince Of Wales	Punsand	Punsand

Horn Island
Native name: Narupai
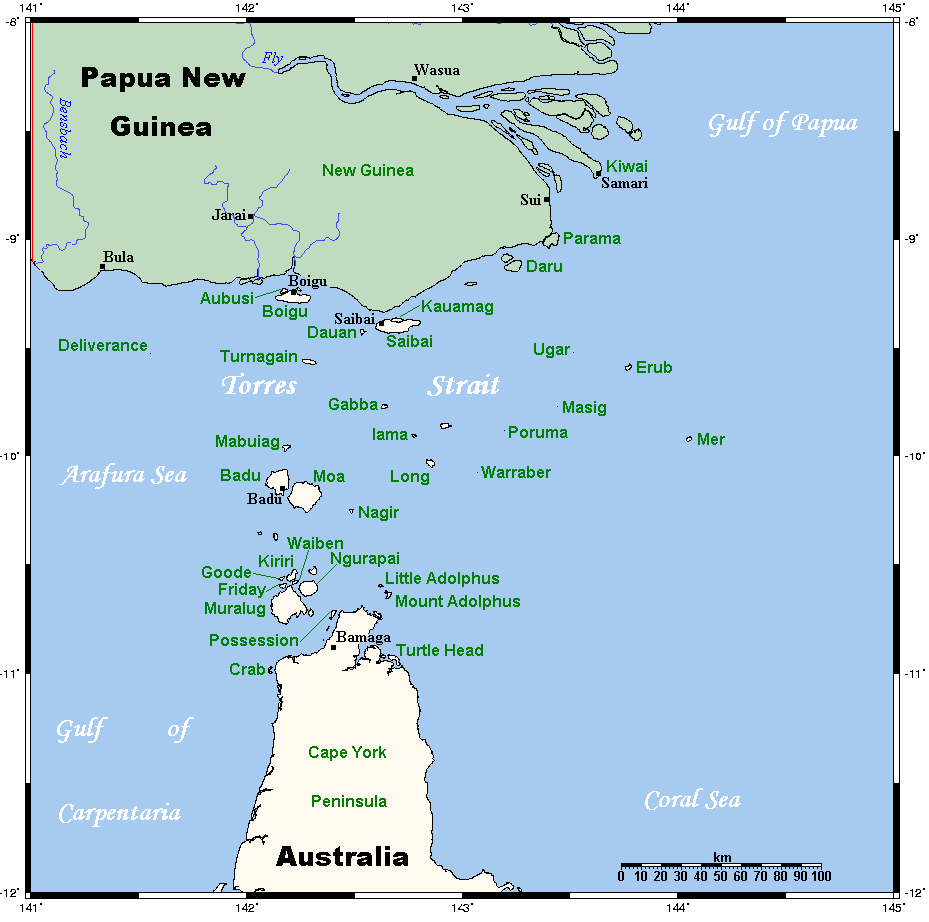
- A map of the Torres Strait Islands showing "Ngurapai" just north of Cape York Peninsula

Geography
- Location: Northern Australia
- Archipelago: Torres Strait Islands
- Adjacent to: Torres Strait
- Area: 53 km^{2} (20 sq mi)

Administration
- Australia
- State: Queensland

Additional information
- Official website: www.torresstrait.com.au/hornisland.html

Horn Island, or Ngurupai/Narupai (pronounced Nœrupai/Nurupai) in the local language, is an island of the Torres Strait Islands archipelago located in the Torres Strait, in Queensland in Northern Australia between the Australian mainland and Papua New Guinea. It is within the locality of Horn within the Shire of Torres; the boundaries of the locality include the island itself and surrounding waters of the Torres Strait. The town of Wasaga is on the north-western coast of the island (10.5944°S 142.2480°E). In the 2021 census, the locality of Horn had a population of 533 people.

== Geography ==
The island is 53 km^{2} (20 sq mi) in area.

Horn Island is the site of Horn Island Airport, also known as Ngurapai International Airport. It is the aerial gateway for travellers to/from the mainland and the islands of the Torres Strait.

The present-day population consists of islanders drawn from all islands of the Torres Strait, as well as non-islanders. Residents travel daily by ferry across the Ellis Channel to Thursday Island for work and school.

Shire of Torres is the local government authority, providing the island community's municipal services.

== History ==
Horn Island is known as Nœrupai (colloquially Nurupai or Nguruapai) to the Kaurareg people and was given its English name by Matthew Flinders in 1802.

The town of Wasaga was named on 1 April 1971 by the Queensland Place Names Board after Wasaga Billy, the first leader of the Horn Island community.

After the 1871 massacre on Prince of Wales Island (Muralag), remnants of the people settled here for a short while, until the government relocated the Kaurareg to Hammond Island (Kœriri), where they remained until 1922. These islands (along with the other islands in the group) are the lands of the Kaurareg, each island – or parts thereof – owned by different clans.

The language of the Kaurareg is Kala Lagaw Ya, in the form of Kaiwalgau Ya (called Kauraraigau Ya [colloquial variant Kauraregau Ya] in the 19th century).

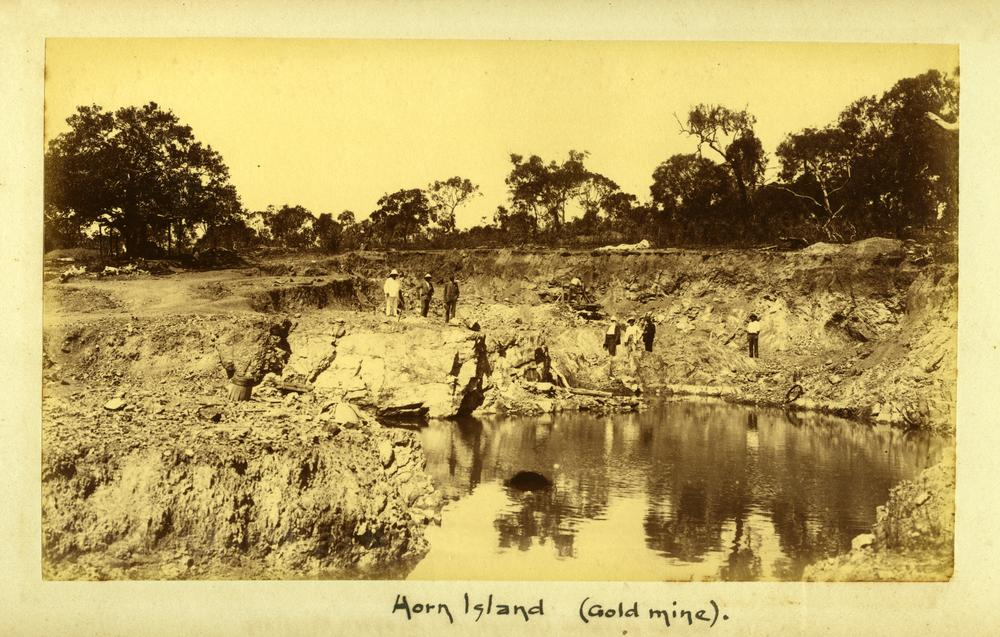
Workings at the Horn Island gold mine, 1899

Gold was mined on Horn Island in the 1890s. In the early 20th century, a town flourished as a result of the pearling industry, but declined when non-islander residents were evacuated to southern Queensland during World War II. A major Allied airbase, known as Horn Island Aerodrome, was constructed on the island and this was attacked several times by Japanese planes. The World War II airbase on Horn Island is described in Jack Woodward's historical biographies Under It Down Under and Singing for the Unsung. Woodward was a World War II RAAF wireless operator stationed on Horn Island. Also during World War II the Horn Island Seaplane Base was built.

Church influence was the London Missionary Society up until 1915 when the Anglican Church assumed responsibility.

In 1946, some of the Kaurareg (Nœrupai) people moved back from Kubin on Moa Island to Horn and settled here in present-day Wasaga Village at the western end of the island. In the late 1980s, gold was mined again and Horn saw the rapid expansion of its population and building activity, as land on neighbouring Thursday Island became scarce.

During World War II, construction of an airport commenced in 1940 and was completed by 1941. It was known as RAAF Base Horn Island. It facilitated air force movement between Australian and Papua New Guinea. Several RAAF squadrons were based there along with US forces. About 5,000 military personnel served there. The island and its airport were bombed by the Japanese in 8 raids during 1942 and 1943. The airbase on Horn Island is described in Jack Woodward's historical biographies Under It Down Under and Singing for the Unsung. Woodward was a World War II RAAF wireless operator stationed on Horn Island. The Horn Island Seaplane Base was also built during World War II.

In July 1959, the island was visited by ocean rower Michael 'Tarzan' Fomenko (c.1930–2018) as he paddled a dugout canoe from mainland Australia to Dutch New Guinea, restocking as he island-hopped through the archipelago of the Torres Strait.

The Horn Island State School opened on 1 February 1993. It became a campus of Tagai State College on 1 January 2007.

== Demographics ==
In the 2006 census, the locality of Horn had a population of 586 people with 360 (61.4%) identifying as Indigenous.

In the 2011 census, the locality of Horn had a population of 539 people with 328 (60.9%) identifying as Indigenous.

In the 2016 census, the locality of Horn had a population of 531 people with 383 (72.0%) identifying as Indigenous.

In the 2021 census, the locality of Horn had a population of 533 people with 382 (71.7%) identifying as Indigenous.

== Climate ==
Horn Island has a very warm tropical savanna climate (Aw) with consistently hot temperatures all year round. The wet season lasts from December to April and features high humidity and frequent heavy downpours. Horn Island is occasionally affected by tropical cyclones; however it is too close to the Equator for them to be a significant threat. The dry season runs from May to November, and features lower humidity and little rainfall. Horn Island has never recorded a minimum temperature below 15 °C (59 °F) or a maximum temperature below 25 °C (77 °F).

Climate data for Horn Island
Month	Jan	Feb	Mar	Apr	May	Jun	Jul	Aug	Sep	Oct	Nov	Dec	Year
Record high °C (°F)	36.7 (98.1)	35.4 (95.7)	34.8 (94.6)	33.9 (93.0)	32.2 (90.0)	32.4 (90.3)	31.8 (89.2)	31.8 (89.2)	35.8 (96.4)	35.2 (95.4)	35.1 (95.2)	37.9 (100.2)	37.9 (100.2)
Mean daily maximum °C (°F)	30.9 (87.6)	30.6 (87.1)	30.5 (86.9)	30.6 (87.1)	30.1 (86.2)	29.5 (85.1)	29.0 (84.2)	29.3 (84.7)	30.3 (86.5)	31.2 (88.2)	32.1 (89.8)	32.0 (89.6)	30.5 (86.9)
Mean daily minimum °C (°F)	25.2 (77.4)	25.1 (77.2)	25.1 (77.2)	25.4 (77.7)	24.9 (76.8)	24.1 (75.4)	23.3 (73.9)	23.2 (73.8)	24.0 (75.2)	24.9 (76.8)	25.9 (78.6)	25.9 (78.6)	24.8 (76.6)
Record low °C (°F)	21.5 (70.7)	21.1 (70.0)	21.1 (70.0)	21.1 (70.0)	17.7 (63.9)	18.1 (64.6)	16.0 (60.8)	15.3 (59.5)	15.1 (59.2)	18.4 (65.1)	19.9 (67.8)	20.3 (68.5)	15.1 (59.2)
Average precipitation mm (inches)	421.9 (16.61)	420.8 (16.57)	360.2 (14.18)	236.5 (9.31)	64.1 (2.52)	14.3 (0.56)	10.2 (0.40)	6.7 (0.26)	5.5 (0.22)	12.5 (0.49)	40.0 (1.57)	183.5 (7.22)	1,768.5 (69.63)
Average precipitation days (≥ 0.2 mm)	22.2	21.3	20.8	16.1	11.7	10.1	8.9	5.7	3.8	4.4	5.4	13.6	144.0
Source: Bureau of Meteorology

== Education ==
Tagai State College is a government primary and secondary (early childhood – year 12) school for boys and girls that operates 17 campuses throughout the Torres Strait. On Horn Island, it has a primary (early childhood – year 6) campus at Nawie Street (10.5932°S 142.2512°E).

There is no secondary school on Horn Island; the nearest is the secondary campus of Tagai State College on neighbouring Thursday Island.

== Amenities ==
Holy Family Catholic Church is in Outie Street. It is within the Thursday Island Parish of the Roman Catholic Diocese of Cairns.

== Facilities ==
Ports North operates two wharf areas in the Torres Strait, one on Thursday Island and the other on Horn Island. These islands serve as transport hubs to other islands in the Torres Strait.

== See also ==
- List of Torres Strait Islands
