= Rita Mills =

Musical artist (1935–2004)

- Also known as: Rita Fell; Rita Tyrell; Rita Fell-Tyrell
- Born: 25 August 1935; Naghir Island, Torres Strait Islands, Queensland, Australia
- Died: December 2004 (aged 69) Cairns, Queensland, Australia
- Genres: Folk
- Occupation: Singer
- Years active: 1975 – 2001

Rita Mills (25 August 1935 – 8 December 2004), also known as Rita Fell Rita Tyrell, and Rita Fell-Tyrell, was an Australian singer from the Torres Strait Islands. She was one of the band the Mills Sisters.

== Biography ==
Mills was born in 1934 on Naghir Island in Torres Strait. She lived on Thursday Island, and during World War II was temporarily evacuated to the mainland.

Rita was one of the Mills Sisters with her twin sisters Cessa and Ina. All three sisters sang, and Rita played guitar in their band. After the twins retired in 1996, Rita continued her solo career.

After she was diagnosed with Alzheimer's disease in 2000, she moved to Cairns, retiring in 2001 and she died aged 69 on 8 December 2004.

== Personal life ==
As of 1970, she was married to Jack Fell. She was later also known as Rita Tyrell and Rita Fell-Tyrell.

== Discography ==
- Blue Mountain (1999)
- Mata Nice (2001)
