= Thursday Island =

Island in Queensland, Australia

- Town
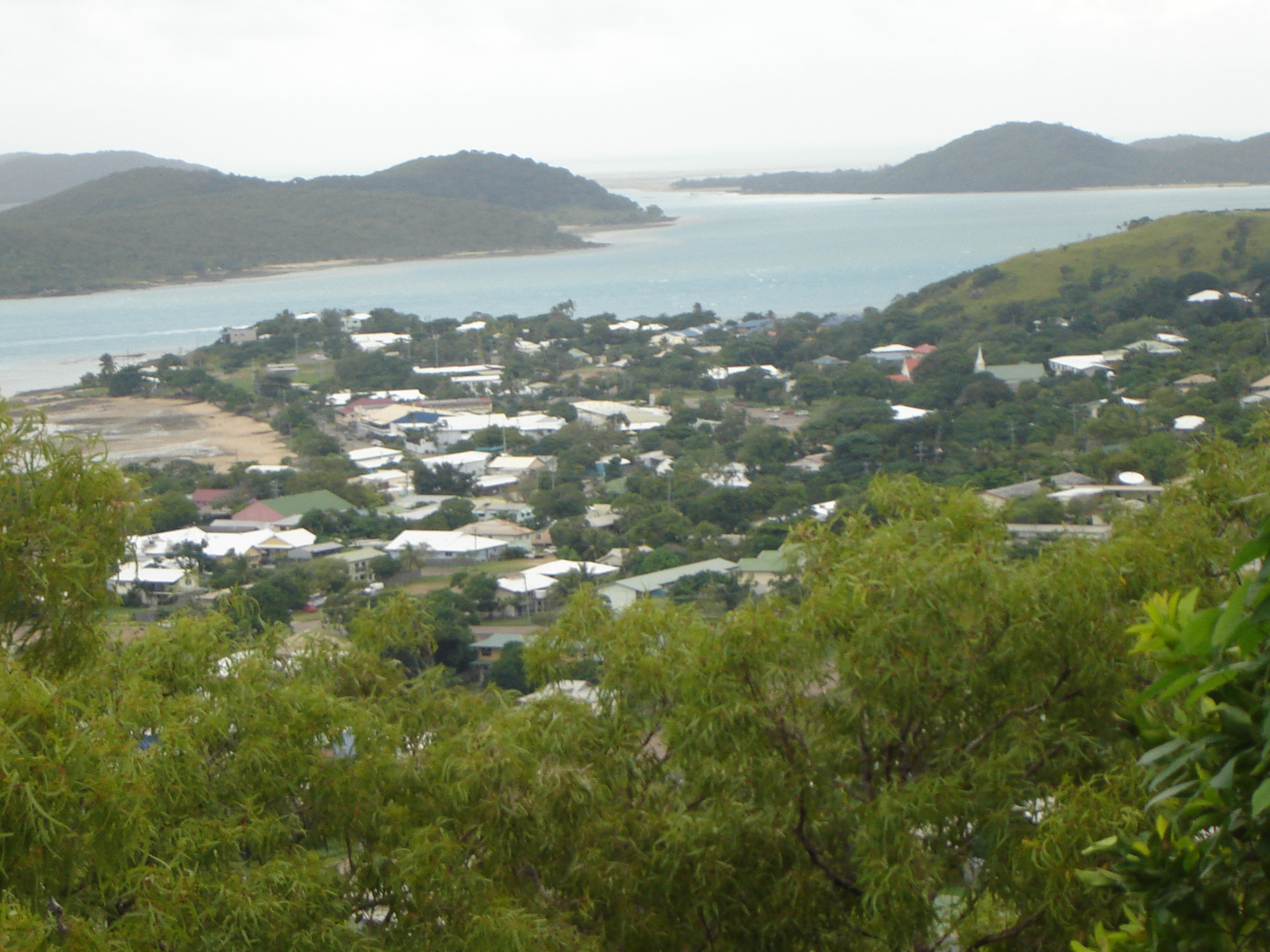
- View of the township of Thursday Island

- Interactive map of Thursday Island
- Coordinates: 10.585°S 142.2205°E
- Country: Australia
- State: Queensland
- LGA: Shire of Torres

Government
  - State electorate: Cook
  - Federal division: Leichhardt

Area
  - Total: 3.5 km^{2} (1.4 sq mi)
- Elevation: 8.0 m (26.2 ft)

Population
  - Total: 2,805 (2021 census)
  - Density: 801/km^{2} (2,076/sq mi)
- Time zone: UTC+10:00 (AEST)
- Postcode: 4875
- Mean max temp: 30.5 °C (86.9 °F)
- Mean min temp: 24.7 °C (76.5 °F)
- Annual rainfall: 1,791.6 mm (70.54 in)
Localities around Thursday Island
Keriri Island	Keriri Island	Torres Strait
Torres Strait	Thursday Island	Horn
Prince of Wales	Prince of Wales	Horn

Thursday Island
Native name: Waiben Nickname: TI
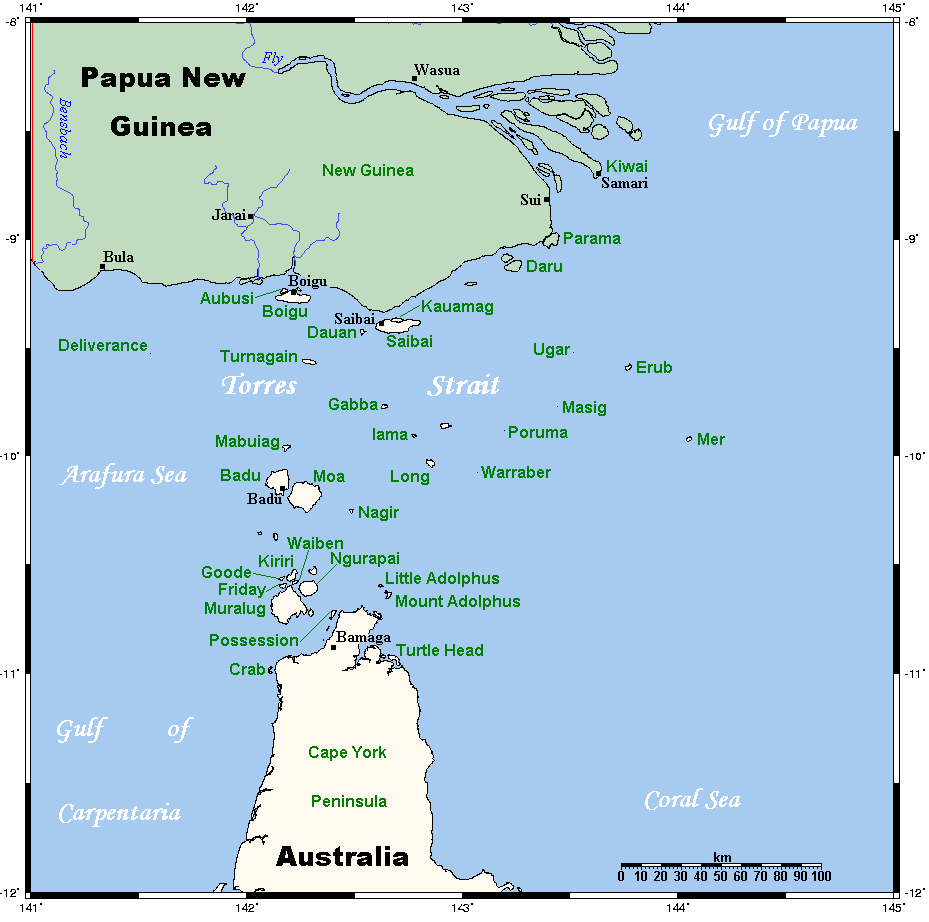
- A map of the Torres Strait Islands showing 'Waiben' in the south-western waters of Torres Strait

Geography
- Location: Northern Australia
- Archipelago: Torres Strait Islands
- Adjacent to: Torres Strait
- Area: 3.5 km^{2} (1.4 sq mi)
- Highest elevation: 104 m (341 ft)

Administration
- Australia
- State: Queensland

Thursday Island, colloquially known as TI, or in the Kawrareg dialect, Waiben or Waibene, is an island of the Torres Strait Islands, an archipelago of at least 274 small islands in the Torres Strait. Thursday Island is located approximately 39 kilometres (24 miles) north of Cape York Peninsula in Far North Queensland, Australia.

Thursday Island is also the name of the town in the south and west of the island, formerly known as Port Kennedy, and also the name of the locality which contains the island within the Shire of Torres. The town of Rose Hill (known as Abednego until 7 September 1991) is located on the north-eastern tip of the island (10.5698°S 142.2250°E).

In the 2021 census, the locality of Thursday Island had a population of 2,805 people, of whom 69.1% identify as Indigenous Australians.

== Geography ==
Thursday Island has an area of about 3.5 square kilometres (1.4 square miles). The highest point on Thursday Island, standing at 104 metres (341 feet) above sea level, is Milman Hill, a World War II defence facility.

While Thursday Island is within the Shire of Torres and is the administrative centre for that shire, it is also the administrative and commercial centre of the local government area of Torres Strait Island Region despite not being part of that local government area.

== History ==
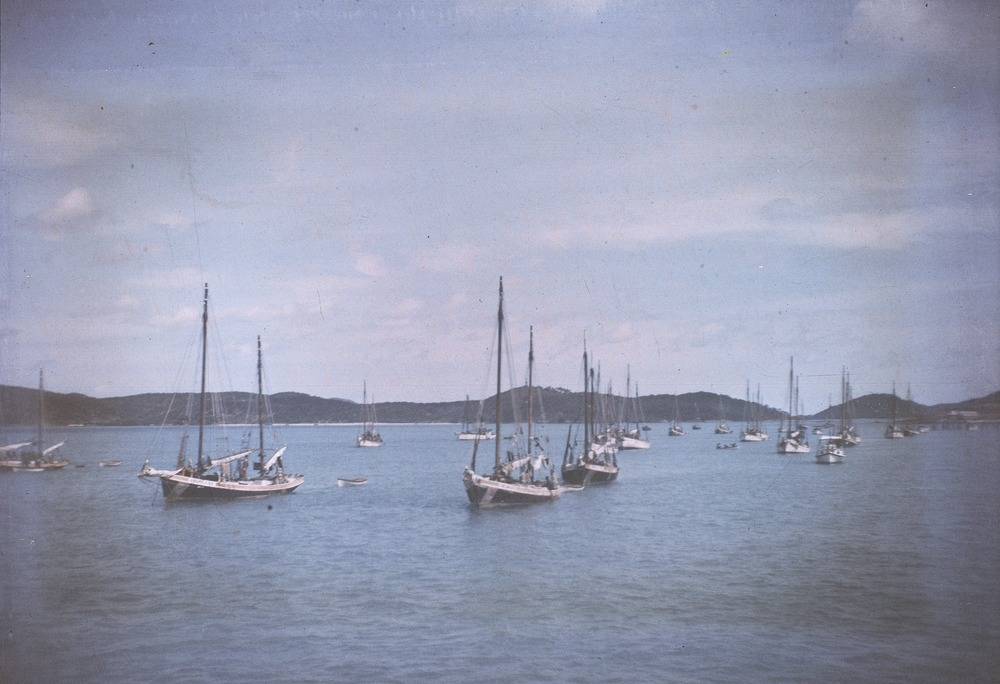

The island has been populated for thousands of years by the Torres Strait Islanders, though archeological evidence on Badu, further north in Torres Strait, suggests that the area has been inhabited from before the end of the last Ice Age. The archaeology from Badu, Pulu, Saibai and Mer shows that Melanesian occupation started around 2,600 years ago (see Kalaw Lagaw Ya).

In 1848 a hydrographic survey of the area was conducted by Captain Owen Stanley of the Royal Navy, the commander of HMS Rattlesnake. He named this island Friday Island and another island Thursday Island (presumably reflecting the day of the week on which he named them). However, in June 1855 Admiral Sir Francis Beaufort of the Royal Navy (the Admiralty Hydrographer) decided to switch the names around, likely to preserve the east-west naming sequence with the present-day Friday Island and the nearby Wednesday Island.

The original place of permanent European settlement in Torres Strait was Somerset, south-east of the tip of Cape York Peninsula, established in 1864. However, the channel between Albany Island and Somerset proved to be hazardous for a port and in 1875 it was jointly decided by the Queensland and British governments to transfer the port to the deep anchorage on the south side of Thursday Island. The new port was called Port Kennedy, after Edmund Kennedy, the explorer of Cape York Peninsula, and was established in 1867. The town that developed on the island was also called Port Kennedy, but on 1 June 1962 the town was renamed Thursday Island.

In 1877, an administrative centre for the Torres Strait Islands was set up on the island by the Queensland Government and by 1883 over 200 pearling vessels were based on the island.

=== Pearl trade ===
A lucrative pearling industry was founded on the island in 1884, attracting workers from around Asia, including Japan, Malaya and India, seeking their fortune. The Japanese community was in part indentured divers and boat hands who returned to Japan after a period of service and some longer term residents who were active in boat building and in the ownership of luggers for hire—which was illegal but bypassed by leases through third parties back to other Japanese, a practice called "dummying". Additionally, many south Pacific Islanders worked in the industry, with some originally imported against their will, in a practice known as blackbirding. While the pearling industry has declined in importance, the mix of cultures is evident to this day. The pearling industry centred on the harvesting of pearl shell, which was used mainly to make shirt buttons. The local pearl oyster is Golden Lip Oyster, Pinctada maxima.

=== Shell trade ===
Trochus shell was also gathered using specialized boats. Most shell was exported as the raw material—to a London-based market. Pearls themselves were rare and a bonus for the owner or crew. The boats used were very graceful two-masted luggers. In shallow water free diving was used while in deeper water diver's dress, or an abbreviated form of it, with a surface air supply was used. In good times there were three divers to a lugger, a stern diver, one midships, and one diver off the bow. A manual air compressor was used. It looked like a yard-wide cube with two large wheels mounted one on each side.

For part of the fleet that operated further from Thursday Island, larger vessels, typically schooners were used as mother ships to the luggers. Shell was usually opened on the mother vessels rather than on the luggers, in order to secure any pearls found. The waters of the Straits are murky and visibility was generally very poor. Even though dive depths were not great, except at the Darnley Deep (near Darnley or Erub Island), which was 40 fathoms (240 feet), attacks of the bends were common and deaths frequent.

=== Telegraph, trade, and cyclone ===
The Thursday Island Parish of the Roman Catholic Vicariate Apostolic of Cooktown (now the Roman Catholic Diocese of Cairns) was established in 1884.

On 25 August 1887, The Paterson (Cape York) Telegraph Station on the West Coast of Cape York was opened. It connected the Cape York Telegraph Line with Thursday Island, via an undersea cable.

In the late-19th and early-20th centuries Thursday Island was a regular stop for vessels trading between the east coast of Australia and Southeast Asia. A shipping disaster to a vessel in this service occurred in 1890 when RMS Quetta struck an uncharted reef in the Strait and sank in five minutes with the loss of over 130 lives. The Anglican Church on Thursday Island built shortly afterwards was named the Quetta All Souls Memorial Cathedral in memory of the event. Today the church is called All Souls and St Bartholomew Church.

Joshua Slocum (the first person to sail alone around the world) visited Thursday Island on this voyage in 1897 at the time of Queen Victoria's Diamond Jubilee. Slocum's memoir describes the Jubilee celebrations (including a corroboree) organised by Government Resident John Douglas.

Cyclone Mahina, which hit Bathurst Bay, southeast of Thursday Island in 1899, wrecked the pearling fleet sheltering there, with huge losses of vessels and lives.

=== Fort ===
The fear of Russian invasion as a result of the deterioration of relations between the Russian Empire and the British Empire led to a fort on Battery Point being built in 1892 to protect the island. The fort has not been in operation since 1927, but is today a heritage feature of the island.

=== Twentieth century ===
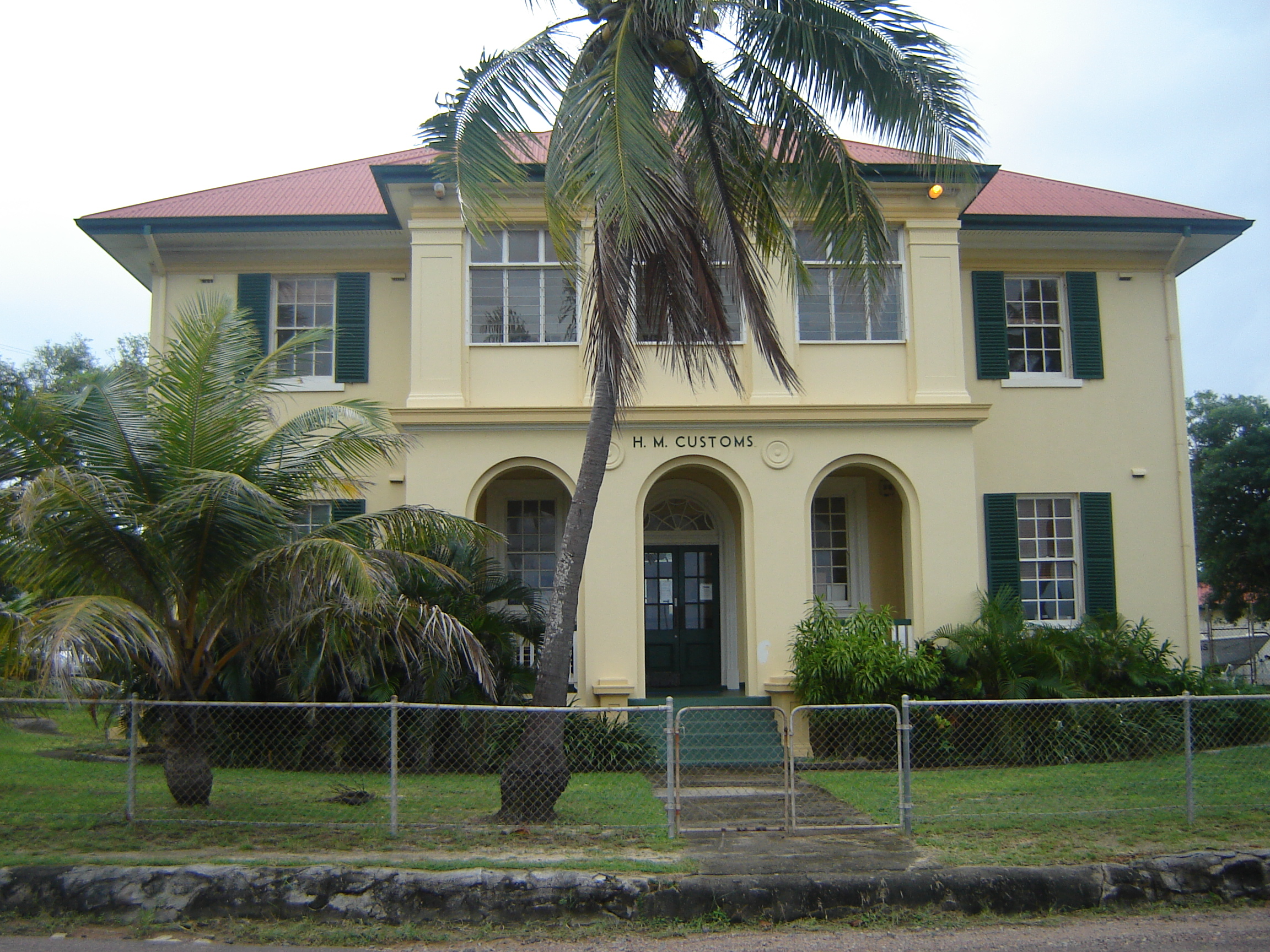
Customs House on Thursday Island

Local pearling declined steadily up to World War II, partly through competition from a Japanese-based fleet which did not use local resources or personnel. In the 1950s plastic buttons imitating pearl supplanted much of the demand for shell. Before the decline, pearl fishing was taken by the island-based fleet to the Aru Islands in what was then the Dutch East Indies.

The Thursday Island Customs House opened in 1938 at 2 Victoria Parade (10.5848°S 142.2209°E).

During World War II, Thursday Island became the military headquarters for the Torres Strait and was a base for Australian and United States forces. January 1942 saw the evacuation of civilians from the island. Residents of Japanese origin or descent were interned. The residents did not return until after the end of the war and many ethnic Japanese were forcibly repatriated. The island was spared from bombing in World War II, due, it was thought, to it being the burial place of many Japanese pearl shell divers, or possibly the Japanese thinking there were still Japanese residents on the island. However, neighbouring Horn Island was extensively bombed. There was an airbase there, used by the Allies to attack parts of New Guinea. At the end of the war, the island tradition of a no-footwear policy was reinstated out of respect for the ancient spirits believed to reside on the island. After the war, an airline service was set up by Ansett Airlines from Cairns to TI twice a week, using de Havilland Dragon Rapides and later DC3s. Passengers disembarked on Horn Island and caught a ferry-boat over to TI, as they still do. The island was also served by a ship, the Elsana, which made the journey once a month. For a short period after the war Okinawan divers were used on the luggers but this was not a great success.

In the 1950s, the CSIRO attempted to establish cultured pearl farms, but many were devastated by disease in the 1970s. The trigger is considered by some to be the use of dispersants on the 1970 oil spill from the tanker Oceanic Grandeur. This industry still exists around the island today. In the 1970s, there was also an attempt to farm green turtles.

The Melanesian background of the Thursday Islanders became an issue in the 1970s, when Papua New Guinea sought to include some of the Torres Strait Islands within its borders. The Torres Strait Islanders insisted that they were Australians, however, and after considerable diplomatic discussion and political disputation between the Queensland and the Federal Governments, all of the Torres Strait islands, including Thursday Island, remained part of Australia.

From 1900 to 1996 the Quetta Memorial Church on the island was the cathedral church of the large Diocese of Carpentaria which included North Queensland, the Islands of the Torres Strait and, to 1968, the Northern Territory.

== Demographics ==
In the 2011 census, the locality of Thursday Island had a population of 2,610 people, of whom 64.6% identify as Indigenous Australians.

In the 2016 census, the locality of Thursday Island had a population of 2,938 people, of whom 68.6% identify as Indigenous Australians.

In the 2021 census, the locality of Thursday Island had a population of 2,805 people, of whom 69.1% identify as Indigenous Australians.

== Heritage listings ==
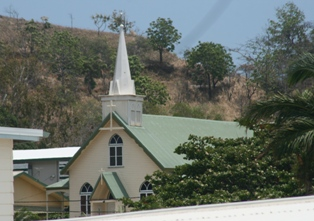
Our Lady of the Sacred Heart, TI

Thursday Island has a number of heritage-listed sites, including:

- Green Hill Fort, Chester Street
- Quetta Memorial Precinct, Douglas Street
- Our Lady of the Sacred Heart Church, 120 Douglas Street
- Thursday Island Cemetery (incorporating the Japanese Cemetery and the Grave of the Hon. John Douglas), Summers Street
- Thursday Island Customs House, 2 Victoria Parade

The Gab Titui Cultural Centre (2004) on Thursday Island showcases both heritage and contemporary Islander artworks.

== Economy ==
Ports North operates two wharf areas in the Torres Strait, one on Thursday Island and the other on nearby Horn Island (which also has an airport). These islands serve as transport hubs to other islands in the Torres Strait.

The Island is one of the two bases for the Torres Straits Pilots, a cooperative owned and run by qualified Master Mariners who pilot ships through the Straits and down to Cairns. This is a necessary service because navigation through the area is tricky due to the extensive reef systems.

The island has the area hospital and courts, is the regional centre for higher education, a centre for some research organisations and is the administrative base for the local, state and federal governments. Banking and phones are available.

Thursday Island is only in part self-sufficient for water, some being piped from the adjacent island. It has two wind turbines which generate some of its electricity requirement.

The economy of the island is dependent on its role as an administrative centre and is supported by pearling and fishing, as well as a fast-developing tourism industry, with perhaps the most famous tourists being novelist Somerset Maugham and Banjo Paterson, and the most numerous being day-trippers from the cruise ships that call into the island each year.

== Climate ==
Climate data for Thursday Island was sourced from Horn Island, which is 8.7 km ENE of Thursday Island. Thursday Island has a tropical savanna climate (Köppen: Aw), with a wet season from December to April and a dry season from May to November. Temperatures remain hot year-round, with average maxima ranging from 29.0 °C (84.2 °F) in July to 32.1 °C (89.8 °F) in November. Average annual rainfall is 1,781.2 mm (70.13 in), with a late summer maximum. Extreme temperatures have ranged from 37.9 °C (100.2 °F) on 8 December 2002 to 15.1 °C (59.2 °F) on 8 September 2019.

Climate data for Horn Island (10º34'48"S, 142º17'24"E, 4 m AMSL) (1995–2024 normals and extremes, humidity only to 2010)
Month	Jan	Feb	Mar	Apr	May	Jun	Jul	Aug	Sep	Oct	Nov	Dec	Year
Record high °C (°F)	36.7 (98.1)	35.4 (95.7)	34.8 (94.6)	33.9 (93.0)	32.2 (90.0)	32.4 (90.3)	31.8 (89.2)	31.8 (89.2)	35.8 (96.4)	35.2 (95.4)	35.1 (95.2)	37.9 (100.2)	37.9 (100.2)
Mean daily maximum °C (°F)	30.9 (87.6)	30.6 (87.1)	30.5 (86.9)	30.6 (87.1)	30.1 (86.2)	29.5 (85.1)	29.0 (84.2)	29.2 (84.6)	30.2 (86.4)	31.2 (88.2)	32.1 (89.8)	32.0 (89.6)	30.5 (86.9)
Mean daily minimum °C (°F)	25.2 (77.4)	25.1 (77.2)	25.1 (77.2)	25.4 (77.7)	24.9 (76.8)	24.1 (75.4)	23.3 (73.9)	23.2 (73.8)	24.0 (75.2)	24.9 (76.8)	25.8 (78.4)	25.9 (78.6)	24.7 (76.5)
Record low °C (°F)	21.5 (70.7)	21.1 (70.0)	21.1 (70.0)	21.1 (70.0)	17.7 (63.9)	18.1 (64.6)	16.0 (60.8)	15.3 (59.5)	15.1 (59.2)	18.4 (65.1)	19.9 (67.8)	20.3 (68.5)	15.1 (59.2)
Average precipitation mm (inches)	425.3 (16.74)	423.3 (16.67)	360.2 (14.18)	236.5 (9.31)	64.1 (2.52)	14.3 (0.56)	10.2 (0.40)	6.8 (0.27)	5.1 (0.20)	12.6 (0.50)	41.3 (1.63)	186.6 (7.35)	1,781.2 (70.13)
Average precipitation days (≥ 1.0 mm)	18.5	17.7	17.0	11.6	6.7	3.8	3.3	1.9	0.9	1.9	3.1	10.1	96.5
Average afternoon relative humidity (%)	75	78	76	74	70	69	65	64	64	64	66	71	70
Average dew point °C (°F)	24.4 (75.9)	24.6 (76.3)	24.3 (75.7)	23.8 (74.8)	22.6 (72.7)	21.7 (71.1)	20.4 (68.7)	20.1 (68.2)	20.8 (69.4)	21.7 (71.1)	23.0 (73.4)	24.1 (75.4)	22.6 (72.7)
Source: Bureau of Meteorology (1995–2024 normals and extremes, humidity only to 2010)

== Language ==
Torres Strait Creole is the dominant language spoken on Thursday Island by the Islanders, followed by Kalaw Lagaw Ya, commonly called Mabuiag (pronounced Mobyag) by many, although English is also spoken. The indigenous language is Kaiwaligau Ya, another dialect of Kalaw Lagaw Ya, otherwise known as Kowrareg, (or more correctly Kauraraigau Ya, the name used by the people in the mid to late 1800s).

== Amenities ==
Thursday Island has number of services open to the community, including a sporting complex, gym, public library as well as ANZAC park and Ken Brown Oval.

There is a community pharmacy, general store, butcher, bank and many other essential services.

The Shire of Torres operates Ngulaig Meta Municipal public library at 121 Douglas Street. The current library facility opened in 2015.

Sacred Heart Catholic Church is in Douglas Street. It is within the Thursday Island Parish of the Roman Catholic Diocese of Cairns.

== Education ==
Tagai State College is a government primary and secondary (Early Childhood to Year 12) school for boys and girls that operates 17 campuses throughout the Torres Strait, including two on Thursday Island. The Thursday Island primary school campus (Early Childhood to Year 6) is at 31 Hargrave Street (10.5817°S 142.2212°E). The Thursday Island secondary school campus (7-12) is at 21 Aplin Road (10.5774°S 142.2138°E). In 2017, the school across all locations had a total enrolment of 1,554 students with 168 teachers (165 full-time equivalent) and 198 non-teaching staff (142 full-time equivalent). The school includes a special education program at Summers Street (10.5800°S 142.2222°E).

Our Lady of the Sacred Heart School is a Catholic primary (Prep–6) school for boys and girls at Normanby Street (10.5830°S 142.2157°E). In 2017, the school had an enrolment of 103 students with 12 teachers (9 full-time equivalent) and 13 non-teaching staff (9 full-time equivalent).

The Torres Strait Campus of the Tropical North Queensland TAFE Institute is located on the island next to the Tagai State College.

== Popular culture ==
The island was the location of the films Lovers and Luggers (1937) and King of the Coral Sea (1954).

== Notable residents ==
Notable residents of Thursday Island include:

- Henry Gibson "Seaman" Dan, award-winning Torres Strait Islander musician.
- John Douglas, Premier of Queensland (1877–79) and Government Resident on Thursday Island (1885-1904).
- Matthew Elliott, Australian professional rugby league football coach and former player
- Tiarna Ernst, professional AFLW and Western Bulldogs Premiership Player.
- Tommy Fujii, mother-of-pearl shell diver as a boy, later businessman
- Ellie Gaffney, nurse, midwife, writer and Indigenous rights activist.
- Scott Harding, AFL player and American Footballer
- Elma Gada Kris, dancer, choreographer, actor, NAIDOC award winner (2019) artist of the year.
- The Mills Sisters, a group of three musical sisters, Rita and twins Cessa and Ina, who performed all over the Pacific and in Europe between the 1950 and late 1990s.
- Danny Morseu, professional basketball player
- Bernard Namok, designer of the Torres Strait Islander flag.
- Peter Ware, WAFL premiership winning footballer with Swan Districts and AFL Queensland Hall of Famer.
- Jesse Williams, born on Thursday Island in 1990, the first indigenous Australian to receive a scholarship to play American football for the Alabama Crimson Tide.
- Ethel May Eliza Zahel (1877–1951), teacher and public servant.

== See also ==
- List of Torres Strait Islands
- HMAS Carpentaria
