= Prince of Wales Island (Queensland) =

Island in Queensland, Australia

Native name: Muralag
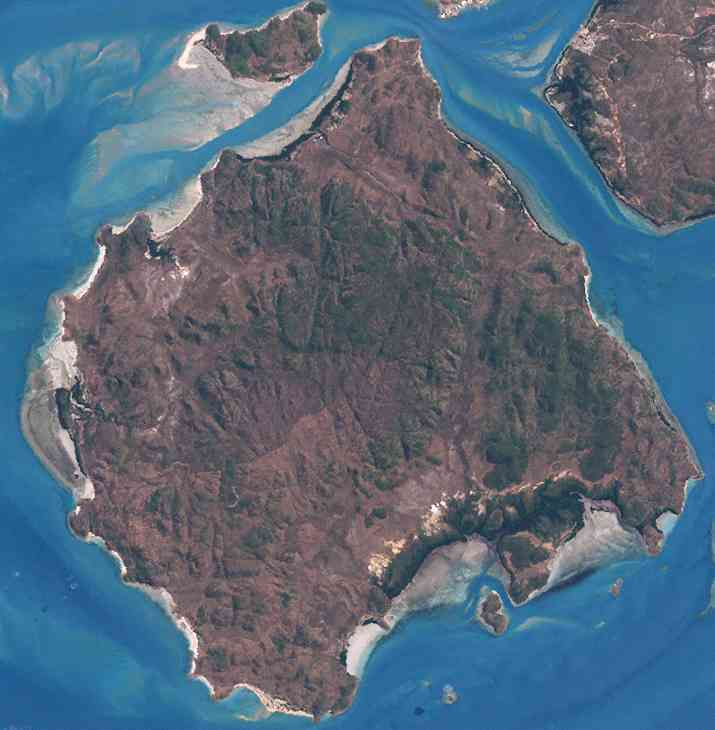
- Prince of Wales Island

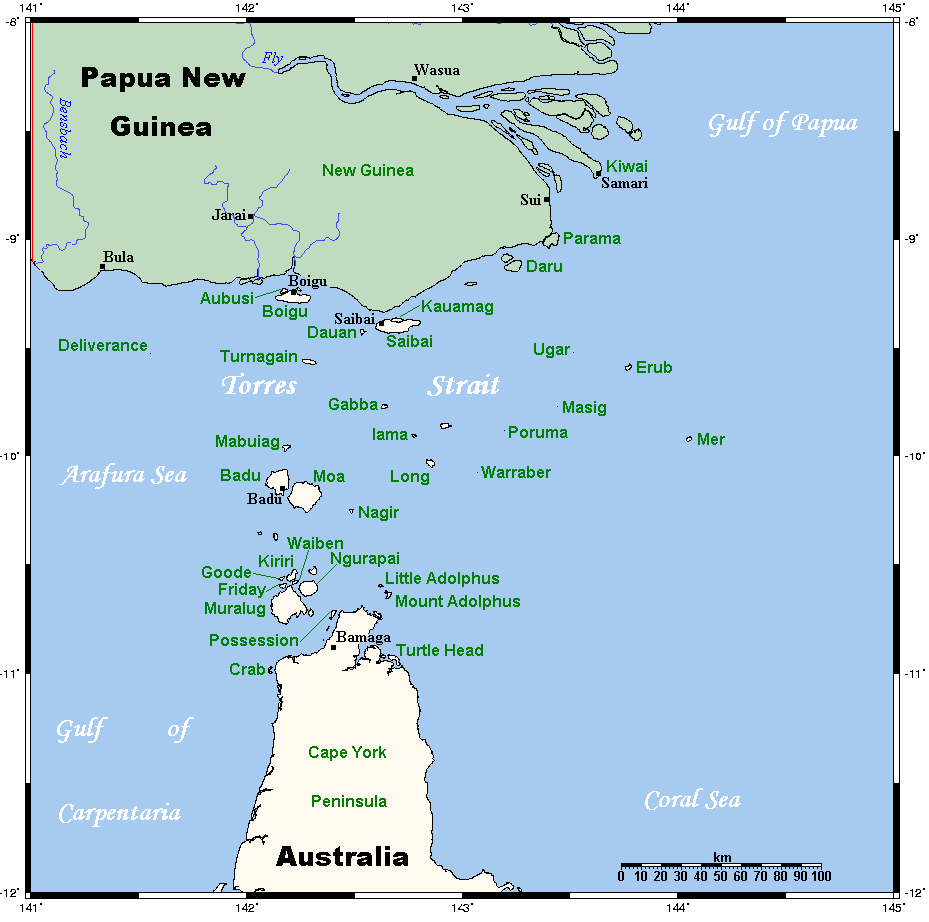

Geography
- Location: Northern Australia
- Coordinates: 10.684°S 142.185°E
- Archipelago: Torres Strait Islands
- Adjacent to: Torres Strait, between Coral Sea & Arafura Sea
- Area: 204.6 km^{2} (79.0 sq mi)
- Length: 19.5 km (12.12 mi)
- Width: 18.6 km (11.56 mi)
- Highest elevation: 247 m (810 ft)
- Highest point: Mount Scott

Administration
- Australia
- State: Queensland
- Shire: Shire of Torres
- Island Region: Inner Islands
- Largest settlement: Muralug (pop. 109)

Demographics
- Population: 109 (2016)
- Pop. density: 0.1/km^{2} (0.3/sq mi)
- Ethnic groups: Torres Strait Islanders

Additional information
- Largest of the Torres Strait Islands

Prince Of Wales
- Suburb
- Coordinates: 10.684°S 142.185°E
- Country: Australia
- State: Queensland
- LGA: Shire of Torres

Government
  - State electorate: Cook

Area
  - Total: 512.1 km^{2} (197.7 sq mi)
- Time zone: UTC+10:00 (AEST)
- Postcode: 4875
Suburbs around Prince Of Wales
Thursday Island	Horn
Prince Of Wales	Punsand

The Prince of Wales Island, or Muralag, is an island of the Torres Strait Islands archipelago at the tip of Cape York Peninsula within the Endeavour Strait of Torres Strait in Queensland, Australia. The island is situated approximately 20 km (12 mi) north of Muttee Heads which is adjacent to Bamaga and south of Thursday Island. It is within the locality of Prince Of Wales within the Shire of Torres. In the 2021 census, Prince Of Wales had a population of 62 people.

Most of the land has been returned to the Kaurareg people, who are the traditional residents on the island.

== Geography ==
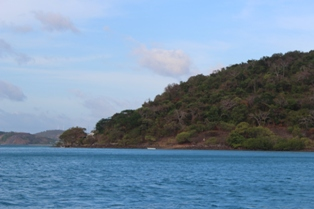
Prince of Wales

With an area of 204.6 km^{2} (79 sq mi), Prince of Wales Island is the largest of the Torres Strait Islands. Being inhabited only by a few Kaurareg families (population 20 in 2001), it is very sparsely populated. The town in the north of the island is called Muralug (10.6003°S 142.2036°E), after the native name of the island.

The northeastern corner of the island, Kiwain Point, is only 830 m (908 yd) away from Vivien Point of Thursday Island, the main and most populous of the Torres Strait Islands, separated by Normanby Sound.

== History ==
First recorded sighting by Europeans of Prince of Wales Island was by the Spanish expedition of Luís Vaez de Torres on 3 October 1606.

The ship Sperwer was shipwrecked in 1869. In November 1869, the police magistrate at Somerset, Frank Jardine, discovered the bodies of the captain and crew of the Sperwer hanging on trees "horribly mutilated". The removal of the heads and clothing prevented identification of the victims. A massacre of Kaurareg people occurred on Muralag and Wednesday Island in 1869 and punishments continued for years, decimating the population of Kaurareg people.

Sometime between 1885 and 1895, there was what was called the Danish Settlement on Prince of Wales Island, "just opposite the Government residency" on Thursday Island. About the same time a pearling station existed on the island, with four boats attached.

In 2019, the Torres Shire Council decided to construct a harbour for the island on a site the Kuarareg people claimed to be of vital historical importance. The Kuarareg opposed the plan and obtained a landmark injunction, grounded in native title, barring future projects. The council abandoned its plans.

== Demographics ==
In the 2016 census, Prince Of Wales had a population of 109 people.

In the 2021 census, Prince Of Wales had a population of 62 people.

== Language ==
The island's native name is Muralag. The indigenous language of the Thursday Island group is Kaiwaligau Ya, also known as Kauraraigau Ya (the name in the form of the dialect of the 1800s) [also recorded as Kaurareg and Kowrareg]. Kaiwalaig (Kauraraig) means "islander", and Kaiwaligau Ya (Kauraraigau Ya) means "islanders' language". Kaiwaligau Ya is one of the four dialects of Kala Lagaw Ya, spoken throughout Torres Strait except for the Eastern Islands, where Meriam Mìr is spoken. Most Kowrareg now use Brokan (Torres Strait Creole) for everyday communication, though the dialect still has many good mother-tongue speakers.

== Education ==
There are no schools on the island. The nearest primary and secondary schools are on Thursday Island.

== See also ==
- List of Torres Strait Islands
- Kala Lagaw Ya
- Charles Eaton (1833 ship)
