= Endeavour Strait =

Strait in Queensland, Australia

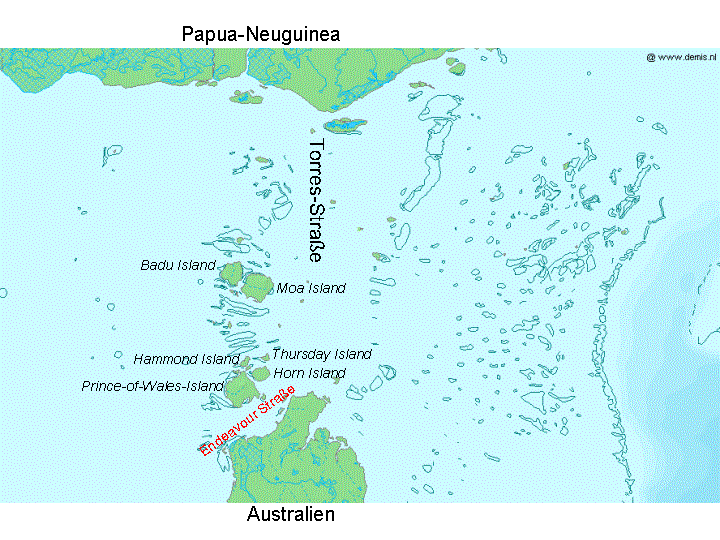
- A map of the Torres Strait Islands, with the Endeavour Strait located south of Prince of Wales Island (Muralug) in the Torres Strait

- Location within Queensland
- Location: Northern Australia
- Coordinates: 10°47′3″S 142°17′20″E
- Type: Strait
- Etymology: The Endeavour
- Part of: Torres Strait
- Ocean/sea sources: Arafura Sea
- Basin countries: Australia
- Managing agency: Torres Strait Island Region
- Max. length: 48 km (30 mi)
- Max. width: 10 km (6.2 mi)
- Average depth: 15 m (49 ft)

The Endeavour Strait is a strait running between the Australian mainland Cape York Peninsula and Prince of Wales Island in the extreme south of the Torres Strait, in northern Queensland, Australia. It was named in 1770 by explorer James Cook, after his own vessel, HMS Endeavour, and he used the strait as passage out to the Indian Ocean on his voyage.

== Geography ==
The Endeavour Strait is approximately 48 kilometres (30 mi) in length from its northernmost tip to its southern extremities, and varies from 3.2 to 9.7 kilometres (2 to 6 mi) in breadth. The strait is, on average, between 13 and 15 metres (7 and 8 fathoms) deep, and its sandy floor is carpeted with a moderately thick layer of coral. The strait is generally safe to travel through, and is not littered with any major sunken dangers or foul ground, although, for larger vessels, there is potential danger at the strait's western end, at the point that it connects with the Arafura Sea, where the depth of the water is only around 5.5 metres (3 fathoms).

The danger that this shallow western point presents was a barrier that the Dutch explorers of Australia never overcame in their earlier sea explorations of the region. If they had been able to pass through the Endeavour Strait at the time, it is likely they would have discovered eastern Australia approximately one hundred and fifty years before the British did, in 1770, as the Dutch had been successful in mapping most of the west coast of Australia during the early 17th century following Willem Janszoon's sighting of the Cape York Peninsula in 1606.

The shallow western end of Endeavour Strait was also responsible for the wrecking of the cutter, America, in November 1844. All on board were supposedly drowned, except 13-year-old Scottish girl Barbara Thompson who was rescued by Torres Strait Islanders living on Prince of Wales Island, the Kaurareg people, with whom she lived for five years.

Today, the strait is travelled sparsely by passing small vessels, and its western side is often used as a bank for these ships. Because of the relatively shallow average depth of the strait, especially at its westernmost extremities, and the dangers that this presents, there have been recent calls for the body to be deepened, but there are no plans for this at the present time.

== See also ==
- Theory of the Portuguese discovery of Australia
