= Lihou =

Small tidal island, on the west coast of Guernsey, Channel Islands

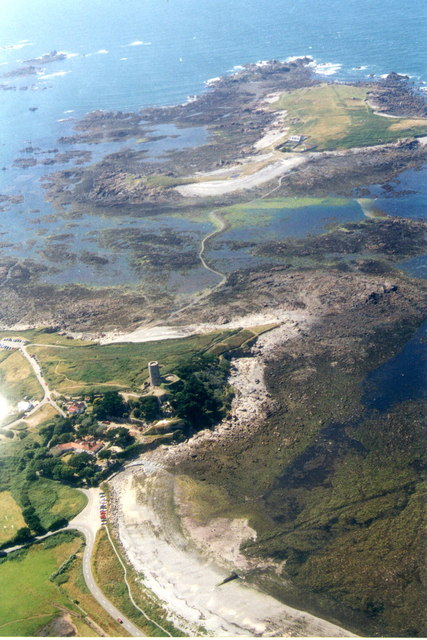
- Lihou and the nearby L'Eree headland of Guernsey

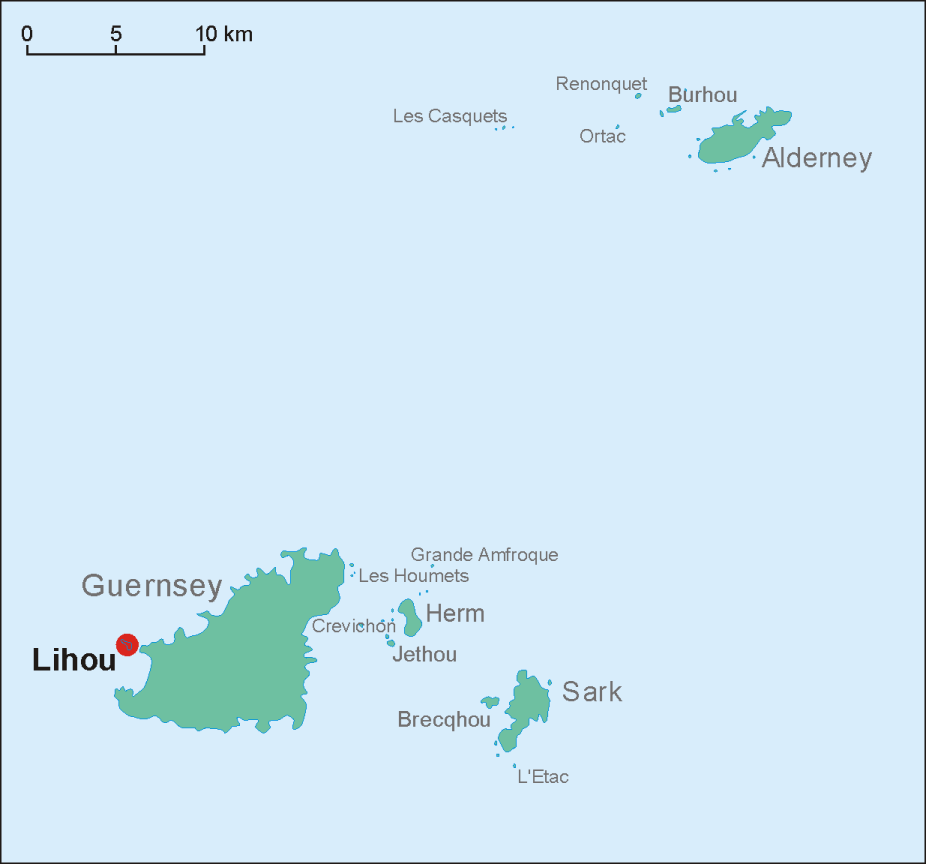
- Lihou is on the far left of the map

Geography
- Coordinates: 49.4610°N 2.6676°W
- Archipelago: Channel Islands
- Adjacent to: English Channel
- Area: 36 acres (15 ha)

Administration
- Bailiwick of Guernsey

Demographics
- Population: 1 (Warden)

Additional information
- Official website: www.lihouisland.com

Ramsar Wetland
- Official name: Lihou Island and l'Erée Headland, Guernsey
- Designated: 1 March 2006
- Reference no.: 1608

Flag of Lihou since 2019

Lihou (/liːˈuː/) is a small tidal island just off the west coast of the island of Guernsey, in the English Channel, between Great Britain and France. Administratively, Lihou forms part of the Parish of St Peter's in the Bailiwick of Guernsey, and is now owned by the States of Guernsey, although there have been a number of owners in the past. Since 2006 the island has been jointly managed by the Guernsey Environment Department and the Lihou Charitable Trust. In the past the island was used by locals for the collection of seaweed for use as a fertiliser, but today Lihou is mainly used for tourism, including school trips. Lihou is also an important centre for conservation, forming part of a Ramsar wetland site for the preservation of rare birds and plants as well as historic ruins of a priory and a farmhouse.

== Etymology ==
In common with several nearby islands, such as Jethou and Brecqhou, the name contains the Norman suffix -hou, which means a small hill or a mound. The name could have developed from the Breton words lydd or ligg, which means in or near water. Historically there have also been a number of alternative forms of the name, including Lihoumel, which was attested as early as the twelfth century, and Lehowe, which was mentioned in the sixteenth century.

Lihou is also a common surname on Guernsey, with records suggesting that the name has been in use in the Channel Islands since at least the eighteenth century, including Royal Navy Captain John Lihou, who discovered and named the Australian Port Lihou Island and Lihou Reef. The name is also attested further afield, in a number of other countries, such as Australia, where for example Sergeant James Lihou, the son of a migrant from Guernsey, enlisted in the Australian forces in 1916 and was killed in action in 1918 in France. There are also numerous instances of people with the surname having migrated from the Channel Islands to the United States.

== Geography and climate ==
Lihou is the furthest west of the Channel Islands and at low tide it is linked to the nearby L'Erée headland on Guernsey by a 400 m (1,300 ft) stone causeway. Apart from shingle beaches the island has a 20 m (66 ft) high ridge running approximately north–south. Lihou is mainly composed of weathered rock below which is granite and gneiss bedrock. The island has a mild oceanic climate like other Channel Islands, owing to being buffered by the nearby English and French coastlines. Lihou shares the weather features of Guernsey, with winter temperatures falling to 4.4 °C (39.9 °F) in February and summers with a high of 19.5 °C (67.1 °F) in August.

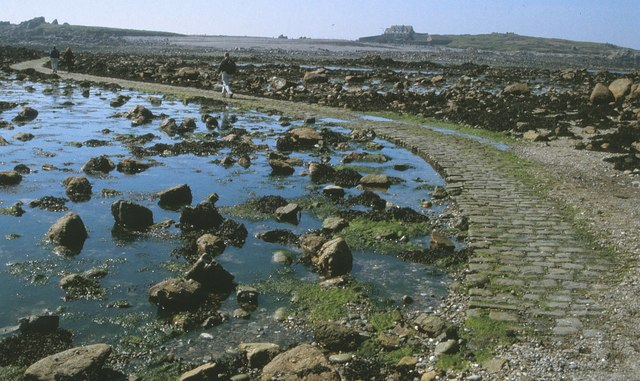
The Lihou causeway at low tide

Two small islets close to the island, Lissroy and Lihoumel, are breeding places for a number of endangered species of bird, including Eurasian oystercatchers and common ringed plovers. Numerous other species of bird and plant are found on Lihou such as peregrine falcons and sea storksbill. The Guernsey Environment Department does not allow visitors to go to the two islets and the shingle bank at certain times of the year in order to allow the birds to breed. Approximately 800 metres (1/2 mile) north of the island is a submerged ledge called Grand Etacre, which was considered to be a hazard to navigation in the nineteenth century.

Lihou island was identified as a Site of Nature Conservation Importance in 1989 and as part of an Important Bird Area, which includes parts of the shoreline of Guernsey. On 1 March 2006 Lihou and L'Erée headland were designated a part of Guernsey's first Ramsar wetland site, covering about 427 hectares (1,060 acres) of land and sea. This has created a marine reserve for the extensive variety of wildlife including more than 200 species of seaweed on the shores of Lihou, and more than 150 species of birds observed in the area.

The geology of Lihou Island is rather complex but closely associated with neighbouring Guernsey.

== History ==
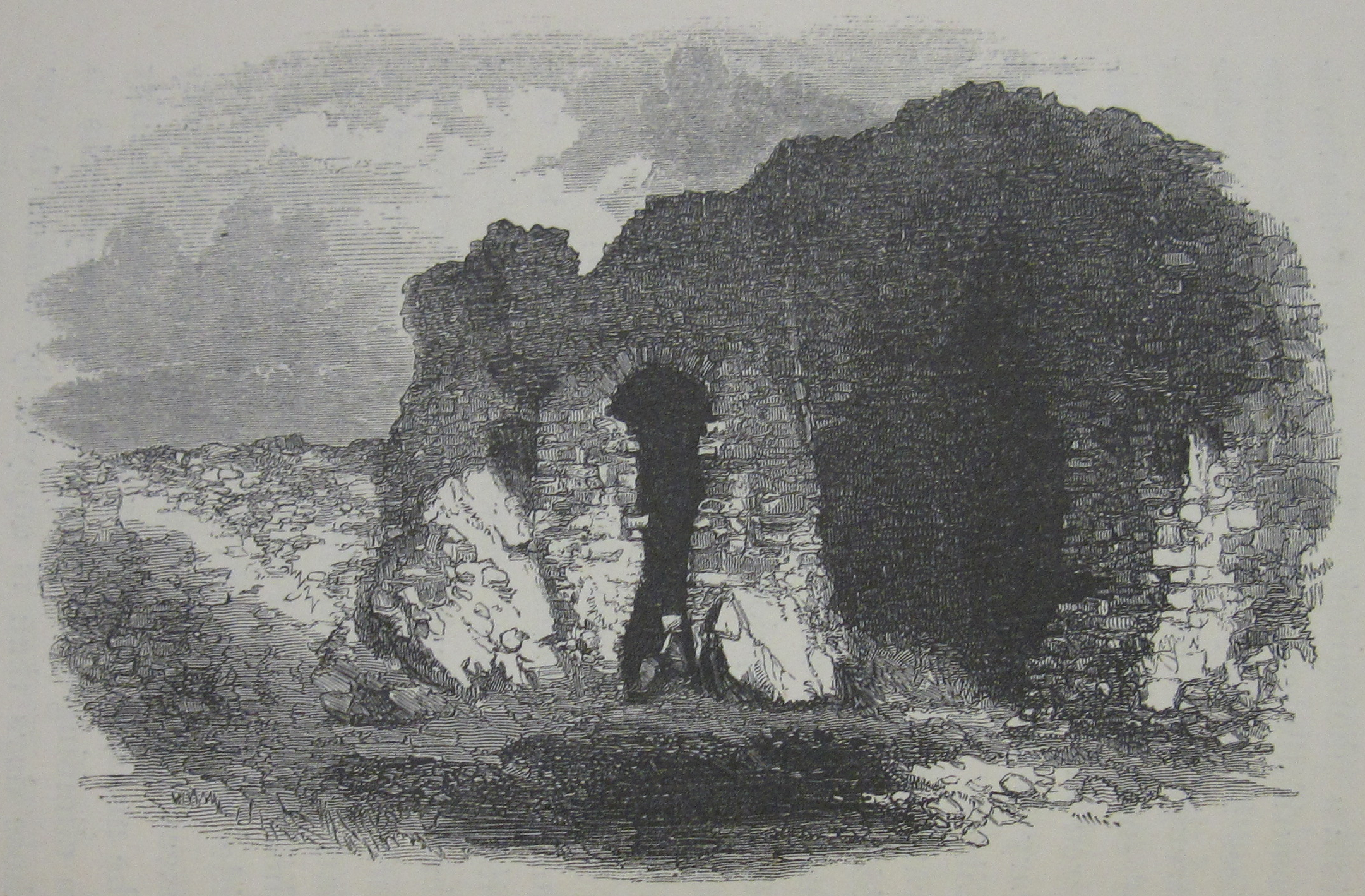
19th-century drawing of the priory ruins

The history of Lihou is closely linked to the history of Guernsey in particular and the Channel Islands in general. The earliest evidence of habitation is Mesolithic objects recovered from archaeological digs of the 1990s, along with Neolithic era tombs on the nearby mainland. The recorded history of Lihou began in 933 AD when the Channel Islands were seized from Brittany by the ruler of Normandy. Lihou and the nearby Neolithic tombs were traditionally believed to have been meeting places for local witches and fairies. This led to conflict with church authorities, especially when a priory was established on Lihou dedicated to St Mary (known locally as Our Lady of Lihou). A number of dates have been suggested for the establishment of the priory, with estimates ranging from as early as 1114 to as late as 1156. Records suggest that the priory was an arrière-fief of the Benedictine abbey of Mont St Michel under whose authority it operated. Ownership of the island was granted to the abbey by Robert I, Duke of Normandy in the early part of the eleventh century. The priory is thought to have been constructed with contributions from the Guernseymen, who appear to have been fairly affluent at the time.

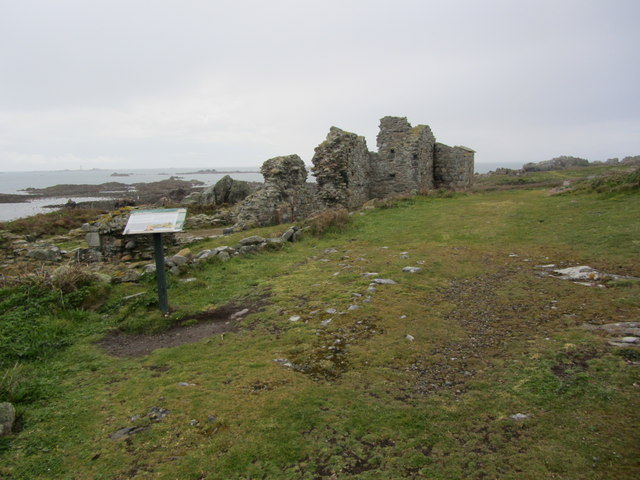
The ruins of St Mary's Priory

In the early fourteenth century, Lihou may have become the origin of a local legend about a wealthy Bailiff of Guernsey who attempted to have an innocent peasant executed on false charges of theft of silver cups. In either 1302 or 1304, a priory servant called Thomas le Roer was alleged to have murdered one of the monks. The Bailiff and several assistants attempted to apprehend Le Roer, but he did not surrender, and was subsequently killed by Ranulph Gautier, one of the Bailiff's assistants. Gautier tried to find sanctuary in a nearby church and eventually fled to England, before returning to Guernsey when the king pardoned him. However, some years later, Gautier was tortured to death in Castle Cornet, but it is not known why.

The priory was seized in 1414 by King Henry V of England, along with a number of alien priories. In the first three centuries, several Priors were appointed, sometimes with short tenures, but in 1500 Ralph Leonard was installed as Prior for life. However, within decades the Priory was abandoned, with evidence of Thomas de Baugy being the final Prior around 1560. There is also evidence that the priory was allocated in 1566 to John After, who had also been appointed as the Dean of Guernsey.

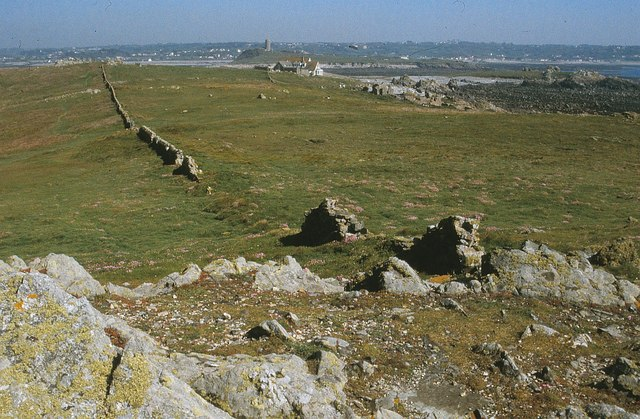
The remains of walls on Lihou

In 1759, the Governor of Guernsey, John West, had the priory destroyed to prevent French forces from capturing the island during the Seven Years' War. In the early nineteenth century a farmhouse was built on Lihou and the island was listed as being owned by Eleazar le Marchant, who held the post of lieutenant bailiff of Guernsey. In 1815 Eleazar made an ultimately unsuccessful attempt to suppress the seaweed industry based around Lihou. In a book published in the same year, William Berry noted the presence of an "iron hook of a gate hinge" on some rocks approximately three miles off the coast of Lihou, along with the remains of old roads, and surmised that Lihou may have been significantly larger in the past but that the sea had eroded a considerable portion. During the remainder of the nineteenth century and the start of the twentieth century, the island changed hands between a succession of owners, including James Priaulx in 1863, Arthur Clayfield in 1883 and Colonel Hubert de Lancey Walters in 1906.

During World War II, the Channel Islands were occupied by the Germans from 1940 to 1945, and Lihou was used for target practice by the German artillery, causing the farmhouse to collapse completely. During the summer of 1952, the ruins of the priory were studied in some detail by John and Jean Le Patourel. In 1961 Lieutenant-Colonel Patrick Wootton purchased Lihou. Wootton had plans to develop the island, beginning in the following year by clearing the area of the old farmhouse in preparation for the building of a new farmhouse, with construction work continuing into 1963. He organised summer camps for young adults on the island and imported sheep from the Orkney Islands that could eat seaweed. In 1983 Wootton decided to emigrate to Prince Edward Island, in Canada, and the island was sold to Robin and Patricia Borwick. In 1995 the island was bought by the States of Guernsey. The ruins of the priory are possibly the most extensive religious relic in Guernsey. There have been several studies and excavations of the ruins, including archaeological investigations in 1996, and in 1998, when several twelfth-fourteenth century graves were unearthed.

== Economy ==
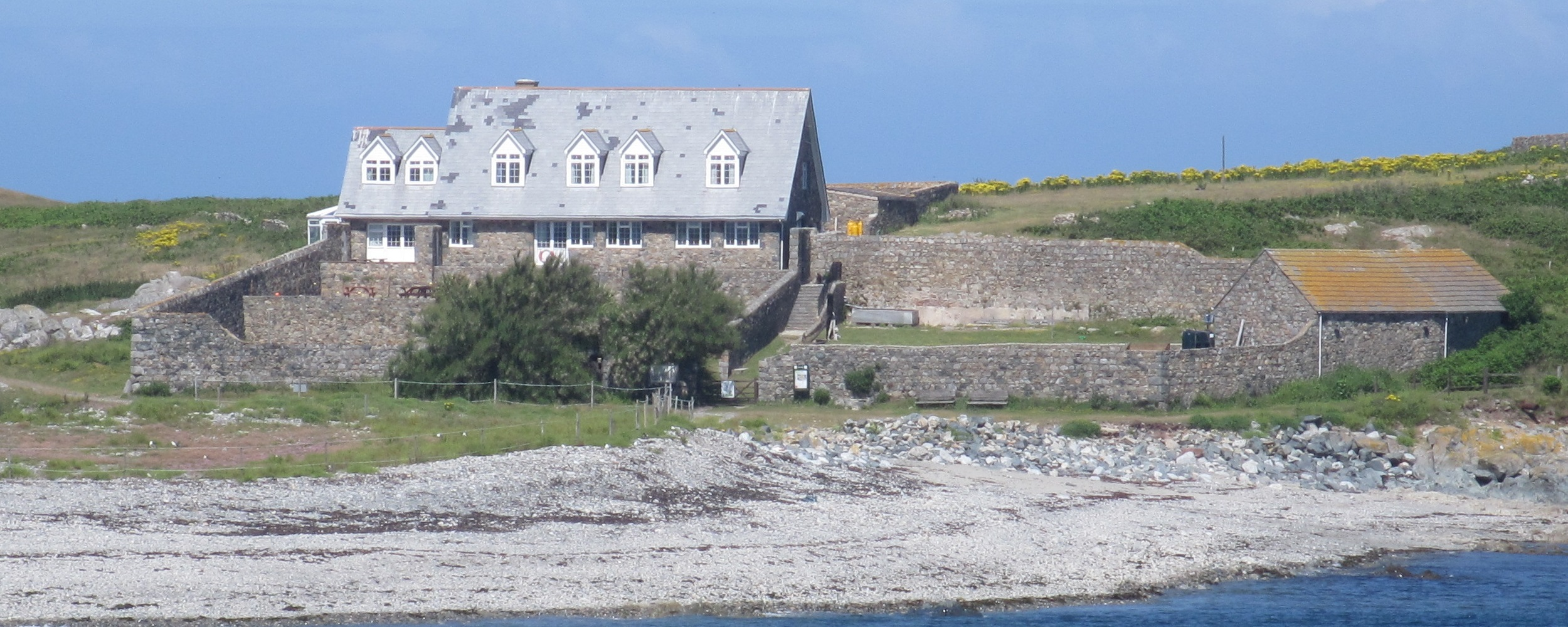
The Lihou farmhouse

Historically, Lihou was an important location for a commercially significant industry based around the harvesting of seaweed (or vraic in the local language, Guernésiais). Records suggest considerable activity as early as the beginning of the nineteenth century. The value of the seaweed as a fertiliser was so great that in 1815 Eleazor Le Marchant, lieutenant bailiff of Guernsey and owner of Lihou, initiated a court case to prevent islanders from drying seaweed on the beaches of Lihou. The case eventually led to new regulations issued in 1818 by the Bailiwick legislature, known as the Chief Pleas at the time, based on a review of ancient royal decrees. However, the Royal Court of Guernsey ruled in favour of the islanders in 1821, with the effect that permission to harvest seaweed on Lihou was granted to inhabitants of the parishes of St Peter’s and St Saviour’s. More than a century later, in 1927, a factory was established on the island to produce iodine from the seaweed.

The economic mainstay of the island is now ecological tourism, based around the farmhouse, which is operated by the Lihou Charitable Trust, although overall responsibility for the island remains with the Environment Department of the States of Guernsey. Lihou and several other small Channel Islands such as Herm and Sark issued their own stamps until 1969, when the States of Guernsey assumed responsibility for postal services in the Bailiwick, which had previously been provided by the UK Government.

== Protection ==
The whole of the building known as the Priory of St Mary, Lihou and surrounding area was listed as a Protected Monument on 26 March 1938, reference PM236. From 1 March 2006, Lihou and the L'Erée headland were designated a part of Guernsey's first Ramsar wetland site.
