= Port Lihou Island =

Island in Queensland, Australia

Coordinates: 10°43′S 142°14′E

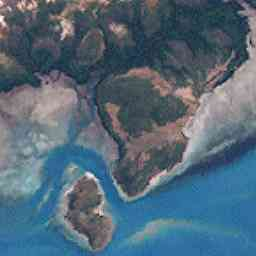
Port Lihou Island (centre) with Packe Island (bottom left) and the lower portion of Prince of Wales Island (top)

Port Lihou Island or Yeta (Yœtha beard) is an island in the Torres Strait, in Queensland's north between the Australian mainland and Papua New Guinea. It lies off the south coast of Muralag, separated by a channel that is three kilometres (1.9 miles) long but only a few metres wide at the north-eastern end (170 m (558 ft) at the south-western end). It is approximately 2.8 by 2.8 km (1.7 by 1.7 miles) in size. The area is 3.97 square kilometres (1.53 square miles).

Since May 2001, the Kaurareg people have held the native title rights to most of the island.

Yeta is the name given by the Muralag/Kaurareg people. Its English name of Port Lihou was given by Lieutenant John Lihou, R.N., in 1823.

Lihou, then Master of the merchant ship Zenobia, was on passage from Manila to South America and had chosen a route through Torres Strait. This was the first occasion a ship was navigated through Torres Strait from west to east. It was also the first occasion a ship was navigated through the Coral Sea from Torres Strait, south-eastward to the south-ward of New Caledonia.

The Zenobia entered Endeavour Strait in January 1823, and discovered a shallow port on the south coast of Prince of Wales Island, subsequently named Port Lihou.

== See also ==
- Torres Strait Islands
