= Punsand, Queensland =

Punsand
- Suburb
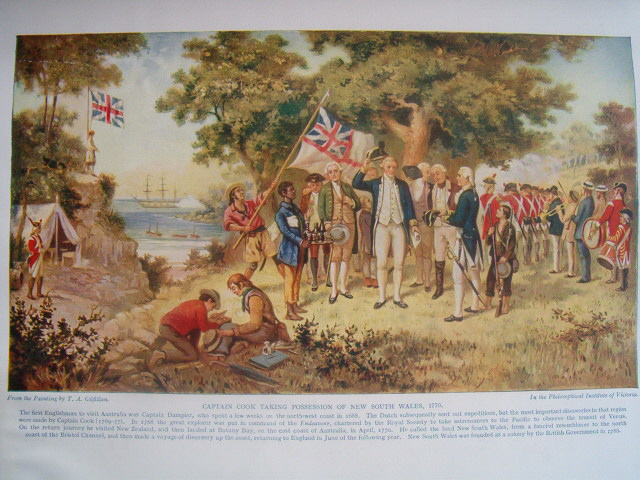
- Captain Cook takes formal possession of New South Wales on Possession Island, 1770

- Interactive map of Punsand
- Coordinates: 10.7240°S 142.4158°E
- Country: Australia
- State: Queensland
- LGA: Shire of Torres
- Location: 27.9 km (17.3 mi) NNE of Bamaga; 495 km (308 mi) NNE of Weipa; 851 km (529 mi) NNW of Cooktown; 1,022 km (635 mi) NNW of Cairns; 2,692 km (1,673 mi) NNW of Brisbane

Government
  - State electorate: Cook
  - Federal division: Leichhardt

Area
  - Total: 149.0 km^{2} (57.5 sq mi)

Population
  - Total: 19 (2021 census)
  - Density: 0.128/km^{2} (0.330/sq mi)
- Postcode: 4876
Suburbs around Punsand
Torres Strait	Torres Strait	Somerset
Torres Strait	Punsand	Somerset
Torres Strait	New Mapoon	New Mapoon

Punsand is a coastal and off-shore locality in the Shire of Torres, Queensland, Australia. In the 2021 census, Punsand had a population of 19 people.

== Geography ==
The locality of Punsand includes the north-western edge of the tip of Cape York Peninsula, as well as several of the nearby Torres Strait islands (from west to east):

- Little Woody Island (10.7153°S 142.3443°E)
- Great Woody Island (10.7040°S 142.3527°E)
- Quoin Island (10.7130°S 142.3702°E)
- Dayman Island, also known as Teran (10.7616°S 142.3737°E)
- Meddler Island, also known as Gaibait (10.7022°S 142.3829°E)
- Possession Island, also known as Bedanug (10.7256°S 142.3981°E)
- High Island, also known as Wurrka (10.7252°S 142.4142°E)

Punsand Bay is immediately north of the mainland section of the locality (10.7146°S 142.4750°E).

Possession Island is a national park known as Possession Island National Park. Apart from this protected area, there is minimal land use in the locality, being mostly undeveloped.

== History ==
In 1770, the British navigator Lieutenant James Cook sailed northward along the east coast of Australia in the Endeavour, anchoring for a week at Botany Bay. Three months later, at Possession Island in Queensland, he claimed possession of the entire east coast he had explored for Britain. In his journal, Cook wrote: "I now once more hoisted English Coulers and in the Name of His Majesty King George the Third took possession of the whole Eastern Coast... by the name New South Wales, together with all the Bays, Harbours Rivers and Islands situate upon the said coast".

== Demographics ==
In the 2016 census, Punsand had a population of 23 people.

In the 2021 census, Punsand had a population of 19 people.

== Education ==
There are no schools in Punsand. For students living on the mainland, the nearest government primary and secondary school is Northern Peninsula Area State College, which has a primary and a secondary campus in Bamaga to the south-west. For students living on the islands, the options are distance education and boarding school.

== Attractions ==
Punsand Bay Camping is on the mainland off Bottom Crossing Road beside the bay (10.7216°S 142.4636°E). It provides cabins, camp sites, swimming pool, bar and restaurant.
