= Shire of Torres =

- Local government area
- Interactive map of Shire of Torres
- Country: Australia
- State: Queensland
- Region: Far North Queensland
- Established: 1974
- Council seat: Thursday Island

Government
  - Mayor: Yen Loban
  - State electorate: Cook
  - Federal division: Leichhardt

Area
  - Total: 884 km^{2} (341 sq mi)

Population
  - Total: 3,421 (2021 census)
  - Density: 3.8699/km^{2} (10.023/sq mi)
- Website: Shire of Torres
LGAs around Shire of Torres
Papua New Guinea	Torres Strait Island Region	Papua New Guinea
Torres Strait	Shire of Torres	Coral Sea
Gulf of Carpentaria	Cook	Coral Sea

The Shire of Torres is a local government area located in Far North Queensland, Australia, covering large sections of the Torres Strait Islands and the northern tip of Cape York Peninsula north of 11°S latitude. It holds two distinctions—it is the northernmost Local Government Area in Australia, and is the only one to abut an international border – it is at one point just 73 kilometres (45 mi) from Papua New Guinea. It is administered from Thursday Island.

In the 2021 census, the Shire of Torres had a population of 3,421 people.

== History ==
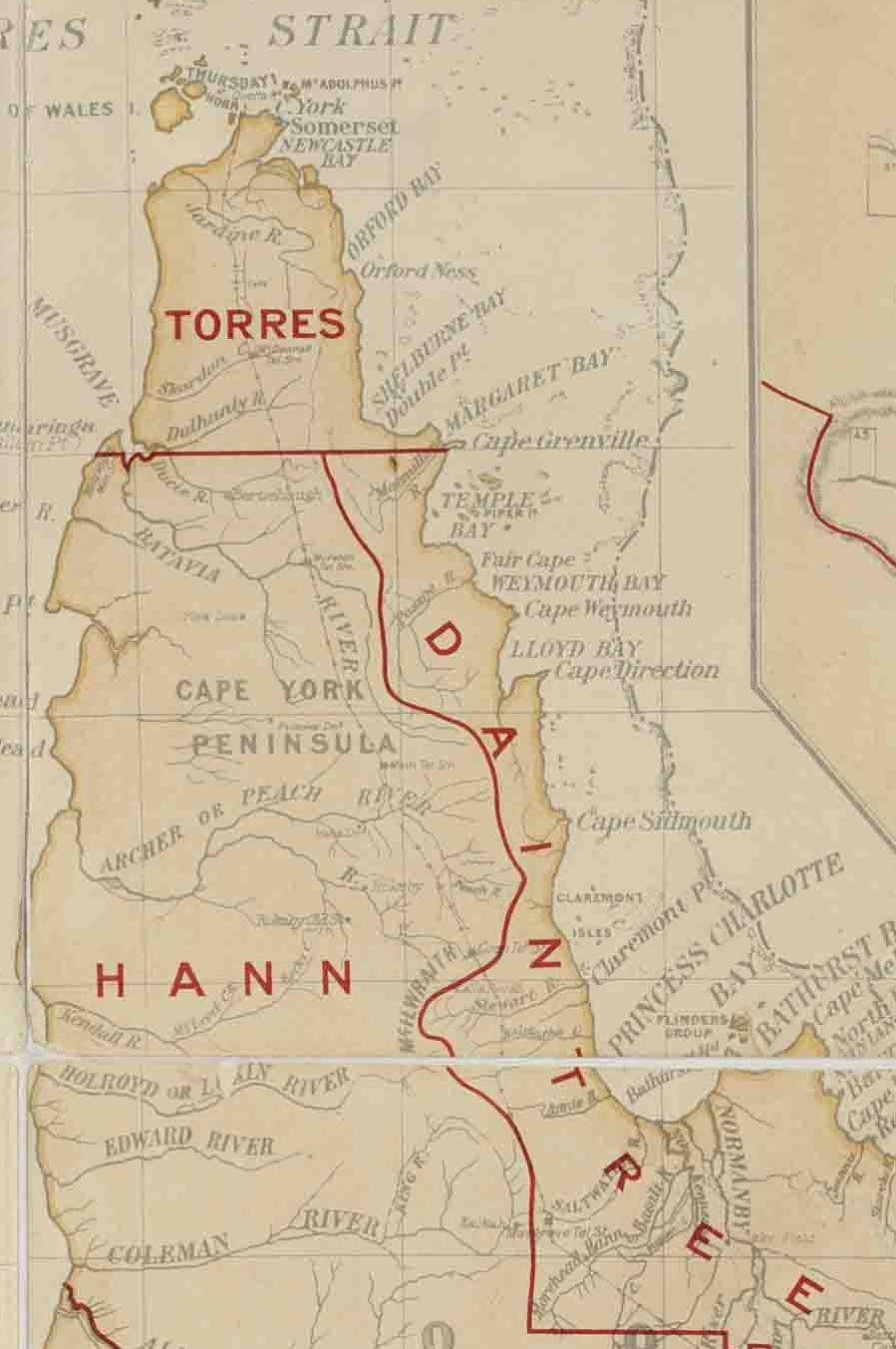
Map of Torres Division and adjacent local government areas, March 1902

The Hann Division was created on 11 November 1879 as one of 74 divisions around Queensland under the Divisional Boards Act 1879. On 30 October 1885, the coastal islands of Hann Division were separated to create Torres Division.

With the passage of the Local Authorities Act 1902, Torres Division became Shire of Torres on 31 March 1903.

Most of the islands were unincorporated until the 1970s, but Thursday Island had a town council going back to 1912. In 1939, the Torres Strait Islanders Act was passed by the Federal Government, allowing for a form of local government on each island. On 27 January 1942, after the fall of Singapore during World War II, the Australian government gave the order to evacuate all civilians from Thursday Island, which now became a military base. In 1946, civilians started returning to the island. In 1952 the Council was dissolved and replaced by administrators.

On 9 May 1974, the Shire was established and gazetted by the Bjelke-Petersen government, in an effort to gain leverage on a boundary dispute between the Australian and Papua New Guinea governments. It was created from the following parts: However, elective government was not restored to the Shire until March 1991—along with the Shires of Mornington, Cook and Aurukun, it was administered by the Local Government Department's Far North regional office.

Original entity	Area transferred		Population transferred
Original entity	km^{2}	sq mi	Population transferred
Thursday Island Town	3.23	1.25	2,237
Cook Shire	2041.22	788.12	1,120
Unincorporated islands	751.55	290.18	2,909

When the Community Services (Torres Strait) Act 1984 was enacted, 15 island councils were created. Each was responsible for local basic utilities and services, and worked with the Queensland Police to provide for community police officers—hence extending well beyond the normal functions of local government. The remaining areas were governed under the Local Government Act like most other parts of Queensland.

In March 1991, elected Council status was restored by the new Goss Labor government, and in 1994 Pedro Stephen became its first and so far only mayor.

== Geography and jurisdiction ==
Since 1984, the Shire of Torres only administers those sections of its area which are not autonomous. It is effectively colocated with the Northern Peninsula Area Region, which covers a number of Deed of Grant in Trust (DOGIT) areas on the peninsula, and the Torres Strait Island Region, which replaced 15 autonomous island councils in March 2008. During statewide local government reform in 2007–08, the Queensland Government considered merging the Shire with the other areas, but felt that having one area subject to three different types of legislation would be inefficient, and the Shire was one of a handful to remain unchanged through the process.

The shire covers a land area of 1,856.9 square kilometres (717.0 sq mi), of which it controls and administers 885.9 square kilometres (342.0 sq mi) under the Local Government Act 1993. Areas under its jurisdiction include as of 2008 included:

- Albany Island
- Dayman Island
- Entrance Island
- Friday Island (Gealug)
- Goods Island (Palilug)
- Horn Island (Narupai) and its airport
- Little Adolphus Island
- Mount Adolphus Island
- Packe Island
- Port Lihou Island
- Possession Island
- Prince of Wales Island (Muralug)
- Thursday Island (Waibene)
- Turtle Head Island
- Wednesday Island (Mawai [alt spelling Muwai])

== Demographics ==
The population of the Shire of Torres, along with Cook, Aurukun and Mornington, have been singled out by the Australian Bureau of Statistics (ABS), who conduct the quinquennial census, as particularly difficult to measure accurately. Reasons for this include cultural and language barriers, transport and geographical spread of the population, who are located in isolated communities and on small islands. As such, all figures are likely to be lower than the actual population on the census date.

In addition, until 1 July 2002, the Australian Bureau of Statistics included the Island and DOGIT councils within the Shire of Torres statistical local area. Information for the reduced Shire back to 1996 has been provided on the ABS website through the Time Series Profile.

Year	Population	Combined population	Notes
1974		6,266	
1976		6,275	
1981		6,131	
1986		6,821	
1991		8,233	
1996	3,282	8,572	
2001 census	9,670		
2006 census	3,233		
2011 census	3,256		
2016 census	3,610		
2021 census	3,421		

== Mayor and council ==
Until the 2007–08 reforms, the council consisted of seven councillors, but this was reduced to four. A mayor is elected separately by the entire Shire. Meetings are held on the third Tuesday of each month at the Torres Shire Council offices at Douglas Street, Thursday Island.

On 15 March 2008, Pedro Stephen, an ordained Full Gospel minister first elected in 1994 and the first ever Torres Strait Islander to be elected as a mayor of a local government area, was re-elected with almost 50% of the vote.

== Mayors ==
- 2008–2016: Napau Pedro Stephen
- 2016–2022: Vonda Malone
- 2022-present: Yen Loban

== Library ==
The Torres Shire Council operates Ngulaig Meta Municipal Library at 121 Douglas Street on Thursday Island.

== See also ==
- List of Torres Strait Islands
- Torres Strait Island Region
- Torres Strait Regional Authority
