= Possession Island (Queensland) =

Island of the Torres Strait Islands near Australia

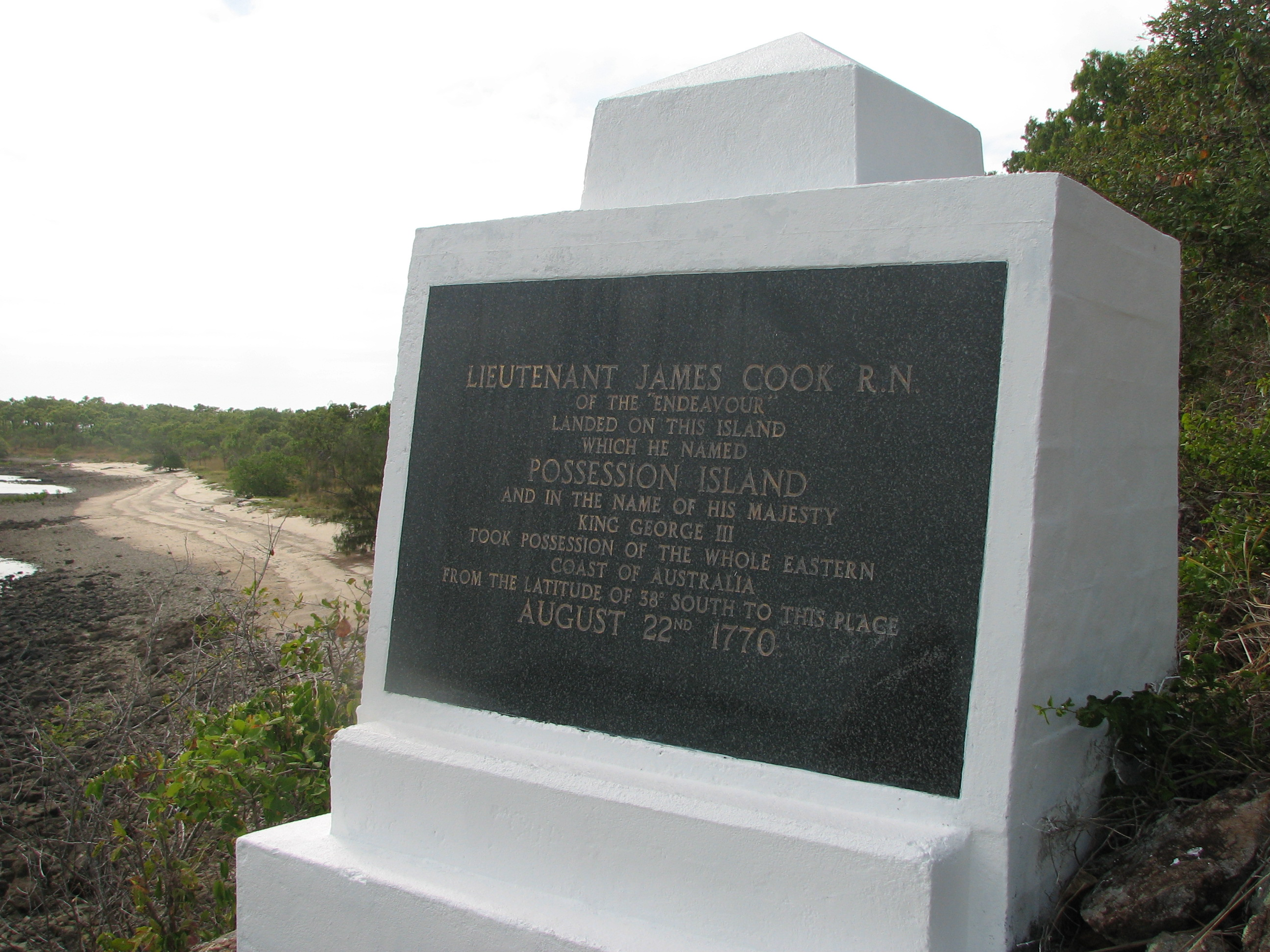
- Interactive map of Possession Island

Geography
- Location: Northern Australia
- Coordinates: 10.72667°S 142.39694°E
- Area: 5.5 km^{2} (2.1 sq mi)

Administration
- Australia
- State: Queensland
- Shire: Shire of Torres

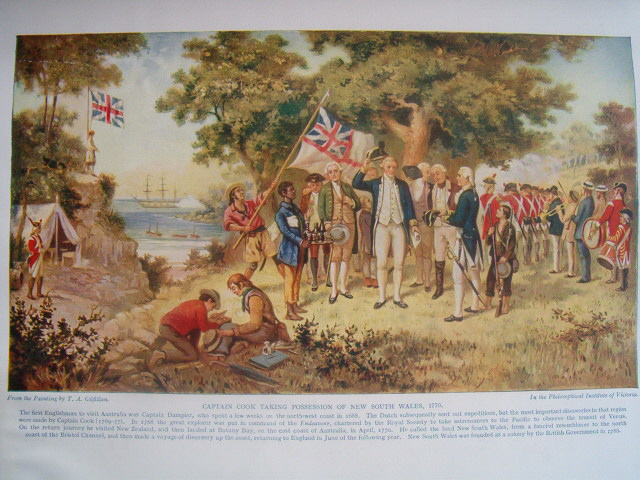
Captain Cook raises the Union Flag on Possession Island, 22 August 1770

Possession Island (Kalaw Lagaw Ya: Bedanug or Bedhan Lag) is a small island in the Torres Strait Islands group off the coast of far northern Queensland, Australia. It is inhabited by a group of Torres Strait Islanders, the Kaurareg, though the Ankamuti were also indigenous to the island. It is within the coastal and off-shore locality of Punsand in the Shire of Torres.

Possession Island is included in Possession Island National Park, an area of 5.10 square kilometres (1.97 sq mi) which includes Eborac Island. The park was established as a Protected Area in 1977 and is managed by the Queensland Parks and Wildlife Service.

== History ==
=== James Cook's claim of possession ===
In 1770, the British navigator Lieutenant James Cook sailed northward along the east coast of Australia in the Endeavour, anchoring for a week at Botany Bay. Three months later, at what he named Possession Island, he claimed possession of the entire east coast he had explored for Britain. In his journal, Cook wrote: "I now once more hoisted English Coulers and in the Name of His Majesty King George the Third took possession of the whole Eastern Coast... by the name New South Wales, together with all the Bays, Harbours Rivers and Islands situate upon the said coast".

In 2001, the Kaurareg people successfully claimed native title rights over the island (and other nearby islands).

== Commemorations of Cook ==
In 1857, artist John Gilfillan exhibited in Melbourne an idyllic tableau painting commemorating the annexation titled Captain Cook taking possession of the Australian continent on behalf of the British crown 1770. In 1925, a memorial to Captain Cook was erected on the north-west coast of the island (10.71503°S 142.39298°E).
