= Torres Strait =

Navigable sea passage between Australia and New Guinea

- Zenadh Kes
- Location within Oceania

- Torres Strait and Islands
- Location: Indian Ocean; Pacific Ocean
- Coordinates: 9°50′S 142°30′E
- Type: Strait
- Basin countries: Australia; Papua New Guinea

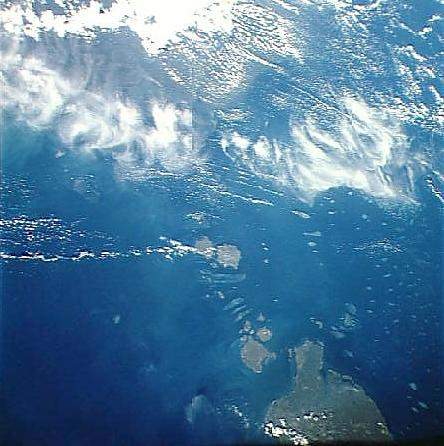
The Torres Strait seen from space – Cape York Peninsula is at the bottom; several of the Torres Strait Islands can be seen strung out towards Papua New Guinea to the north.

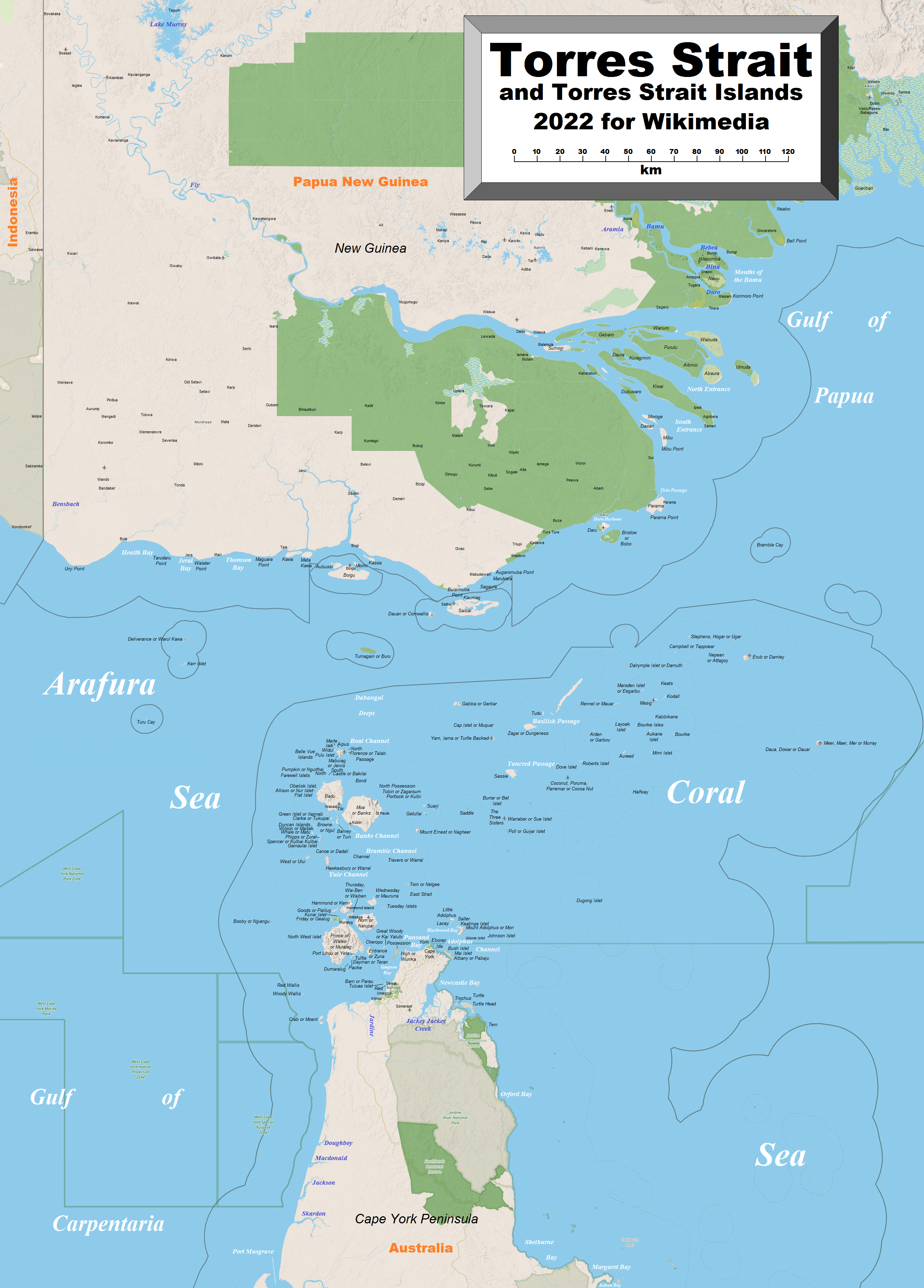
Detailed map of the Torres Strait and its islands

The Torres Strait (/ˈtɒrɪs/), also known as Zenadh Kes (pronounced [ˈzen̪ad̪ kes]), is a strait between Australia and the Melanesian island of New Guinea. It is 150 km (93 mi) wide at its narrowest extent. To the south is Cape York Peninsula, the northernmost extremity of the Australian mainland. To the north is the Western Province of Papua New Guinea. It was named by Scottish geographer Alexander Dalrymple after the Spanish navigator Luís Vaz de Torres, who sailed through the strait in 1606.

== History ==
=== Pre-colonisation ===
The islands of the Torres Strait have been inhabited by humans for at least 2,500 years and possibly much longer. The various Torres Strait Islander communities have a unique culture and long-standing history with the islands and nearby coastlines. Their maritime-based trade and interactions with the Papuans to the north and the Australian Aboriginal communities have maintained a steady cultural diffusion among the three societal groups, dating back thousands of years.

=== Era of European colonisation ===
The first recorded European navigation of the strait was by Luís Vaz de Torres, a pilot who was second-in-command on the Spanish expedition led by navigator Pedro Fernandes de Queirós who sailed from Peru to the South Pacific in 1605. After Queirós's ship returned to Mexico, Torres resumed the intended voyage to Manila via the Maluku Islands. He sailed along the south coast of New Guinea and discovered the strait that still bears his name. This discovery recorded in Spanish maps of the Pacific would later make possible James Cook's expedition to Australia. Torres and his crew are not known to have sighted the Australian mainland visited just four months earlier by Willem Janszoon sailing Duyfken without conversely becoming aware of the strait now known as Torres Strait. No specific records exists of Torres sighting the coast of a major land mass to his south, and early Spanish maps show the coast of New Guinea correctly but omit Australia.

In 1769, the Scottish geographer Alexander Dalrymple, whilst translating some Spanish documents captured in the Philippines in 1762, had found Luís Vaz de Torres's testimony proving a passage south of New Guinea now known as Torres Strait. This discovery led Dalrymple to publish the Historical Collection of the Several Voyages and Discoveries in the South Pacific Ocean in 1770–1771, which aroused widespread interest in his claim of the existence of an unknown continent. It was Dalrymple who named the strait after Torres. Dalrymple was bitterly disappointed that it was James Cook and not he who was appointed commander of the expedition that eventually led in 1770 to the British encounter and charting of the eastern coastline of Australia.

In 1770, Lieutenant James Cook rounded Cape York, turned south-west and landed on Possession Island. From the top of a hill, he signalled down to the ship that he could see a navigable passage through the dangerous Strait. Later in Batavia. It has been postulated that when he learned that the French had preceded him across the Pacific, that Cook re-wrote this signalling drill as a possession ceremony, saying he had claimed Australia's east coast for the British Crown.

In 1823, Captain John Lihou, Master of the 550-ton merchant ship Zenobia of Calcutta, was on passage from Manila to South America and chose a route through Torres Strait. Remarkably, this would become the first time for a ship to be navigated through the Torres Strait from west to east. According to the Sydney Gazette of April 1823: "This essay of nautical skill was accomplished after the loss of four anchors and the rudder". It was also the first occasion a ship was navigated through the Coral Sea from Torres Strait, south-eastward to the southward of New Caledonia. Lihou saw Sir James Saumarez' Shoal (now Saumarez Reefs) on 27 February and named the reef system after Vice-Admiral James Saumarez. On this same trip, Lihou discovered the Lihou Reef and Cays and Port Lihou (originally named Port Yarborough, on the southern shore of Prince of Wales Island). (Note: Lihou's ship is different from the 385-ton HMS Zenobia (1807), built at King's Lynn in 1807.)

The London Missionary Society arrived on Erub (Darnley Island) in 1871. Although some of the Torres Strait islands lie just off the coast of New Guinea, they were annexed in 1879 by colony of Queensland, then a British colony. There was an important pearling industry from the 1860s until about 1970 when it collapsed in the face of competition from the plastics industry. Pearl-shelling was responsible for the arrival of experienced divers from many countries, notably Japan.

=== Modern history ===
In 1959, Australian Michael 'Tarzan' Fomenko paddled a homemade dugout canoe from Queensland to New Guinea through the Torres Strait via Horn Island. Fomenko's journey captured the attention of the Australian media for weeks, with updates on his progress and the Torres Strait Islanders who helped him often appearing on the front page of The Canberra Times.

In 1978, an agreement between Australia and Papua New Guinea determined the maritime border in the Torres Strait.

In the 1980s, Torres Strait Island people wanted to create a name for the islands which related to their culture. Initially the name "Magani Malu Kes" was suggested for the region, but later adopting the acronym "Zenadh Kes", to refer to the Torres Strait. The acronym "ZENADTH KES" was first derived from 'Zey' (south), 'Naygay' (north), 'Dagam' (place/side), 'Thawathaw' (coastline) and KES (passage/channel/waterway). However, this has become modified and it is now spelt Zenadh Kes.

Due to proximity to the Papua New Guinea mainland, the northern Torres Strait islands experience occasional asylum seeker arrivals from across the Strait. A total of ten asylum seekers from Papua New Guinea were detected in each of 2012 and 2013.

== Geography ==
The strait links the Coral Sea to the east with the Arafura Sea and Gulf of Carpentaria in the west. Although it is an important international sea lane, it is very shallow (water depth of 7 to 15 m; 23 to 49 ft), and the maze of reefs and islands can make it hazardous to navigate. In the south the Endeavour Strait is located between Prince of Wales Island (Muralug) and the mainland. Shipping enters Torres Strait via the Adolphus Channel, which joins to the Great Barrier Reef lagoon to the southeast. Strong tidal currents occur in the narrow channels between islands and reefs, and large submarine sand dunes migrate across the seafloor. Some 580 coral reefs, including the Warrior Reefs and Eastern Patch Reefs, cover a total area of 2,400 km^{2} (930 sq mi) in the region, and the area also has some of the most extensive seagrass beds in the world.

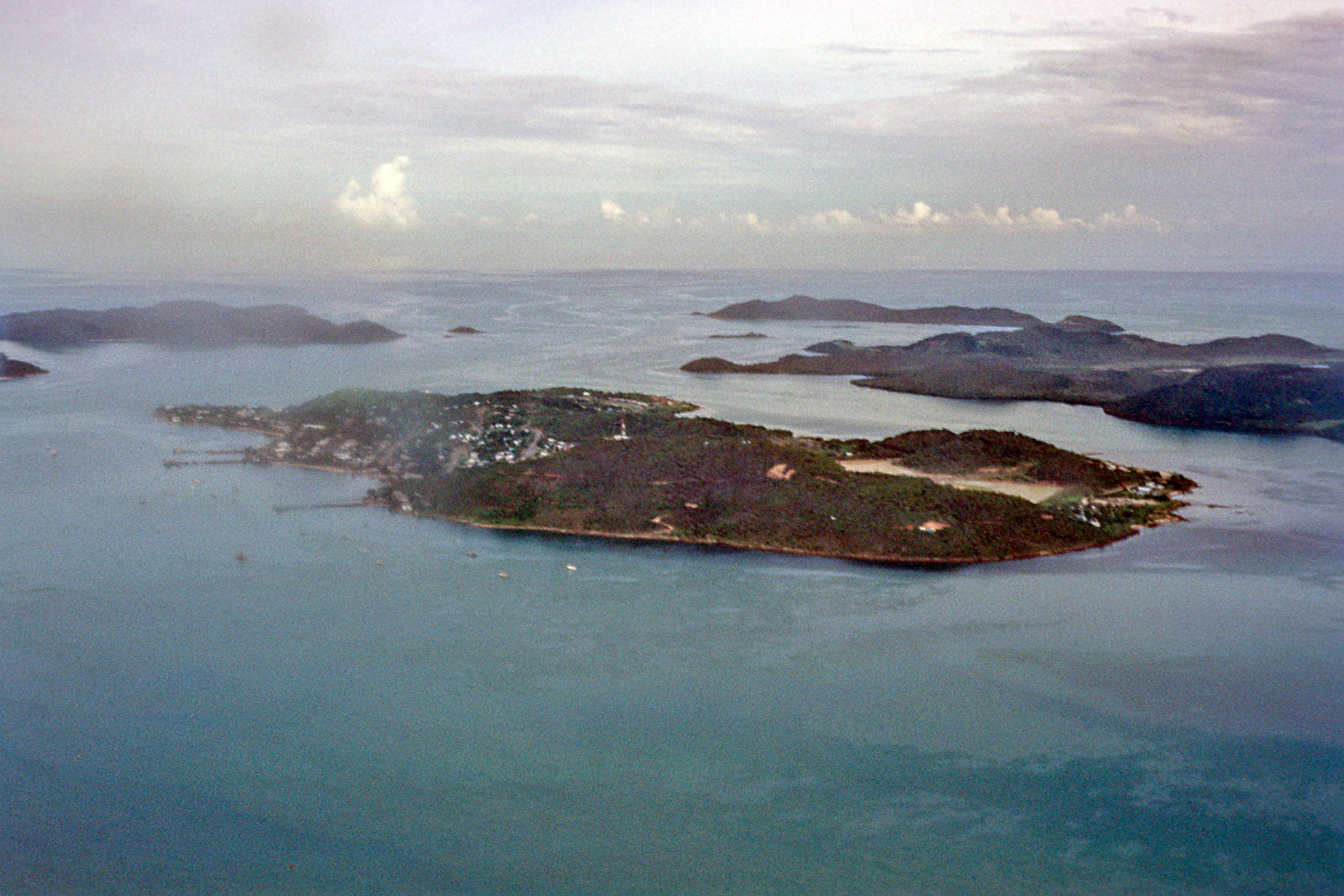
Torres Strait Islands aerial photo

Several clusters of islands lie in the Strait, collectively called the Torres Strait Islands. There are at least 274 of these islands, of which 17 have present-day permanent settlements. These islands have a variety of topographies, ecosystems and formation history. Several of those closest to the New Guinea coastline are low-lying, formed by alluvial sedimentary deposits borne by the outflow of the local rivers into the sea. Many of the western islands are hilly and steep, formed mainly of granite, and are peaks of the northernmost extension of the Great Dividing Range. They became islands as sea levels rose at the end of the last ice age. The central islands are predominantly coral cays, and those of the east are of volcanic origins.

There are several major policy and institutional frameworks in the Torres Strait region that support the sustainable use and management of marine resources while also protecting habitats, biodiversity and the traditional islander way of life. Most important of these is the Torres Strait Treaty, entered into by Australia and Papua New Guinea in February 1985. The Treaty defines sovereignty and maritime boundaries in the area between the two countries. It guides decision makers on protecting the way of life and livelihood of traditional inhabitants, on managing the protection of habitats, and on sharing the commercial and traditional fisheries resources. The Treaty established a Torres Strait Protected Zone within which both nations manage access to fisheries resources. Each country exercises sovereign jurisdiction for resources on either side of the agreed jurisdiction lines.

Environmental issues facing the region include the risk of mining waste from the Fly River in southern Papua New Guinea and the sustainable management of natural resources.

== People, culture and languages ==
The islands' indigenous inhabitants are the Torres Strait Islanders, one of two ethnically distinct groups of Indigenous Australian peoples. Torres Strait Islanders are distinct from both the Papuans of adjoining New Guinea and from Aboriginal Australian peoples of the nearby Australian mainland, but related to both.

The people of the Torres Strait have a unique indigenous culture which has drawn the interest of a range of anthropological, historical, archaeological and folklorist researchers. This includes an expedition from Cambridge University led by the early ethnographer Alfred Haddon in 1898, and the more contemporary regional work of Australian anthropologist Jeremy Beckett. Accounts of local Indigenous narrative traditions can be found in the work of Nonie Sharp and Margaret Lawrie. Lawrie developed strong relationships with the people of the Torres Strait from the 1950s to 1970s, and many approached her to record and write down their personal stories and family histories. This resulted in her conducting research into the cultural history of the Torres Strait and collecting transcripts, audio recordings, photographs, slides, works of art and oral stories. Collectively they formed the basis of the publication Myths and Legends of Torres Strait (1970) and Tales from Torres Strait (1972). Her collection is now held by the State Library of Queensland and in 2008 it was added to UNESCO's Australian Memory of the World Register.

Two indigenous languages are spoken on the Torres Strait Islands: Kala Lagaw Ya (also known by variant names and spellings), and Meriam Mir (Meriam), as well as Brokan [Broken], otherwise called Torres Strait Creole. Kala Lagaw Ya is the traditional language owned by the Western and Central islands of the Torres Strait. The Kala Lagaw Ya language region includes the landscape within the local government boundaries of the Torres Shire Council. Mabuiag is considered a dialect of Kala Lagaw Ya, one of the languages of the Torres Strait. Mabuiag (also written as Mabuyag) is a traditional language of Mabuiag, a Central Western island of the Torres Strait. The Mabuiag language region includes the island landscape of Mabuiag within the local government boundaries of the Torres Shire Council and Mabuiag Island Council.

In the 2016 Australian census, the population of the islands was recorded as 4,514 on the Islands, but many more Torres Strait Islander people live outside of Torres Strait in Australia.

== Shipping routes ==
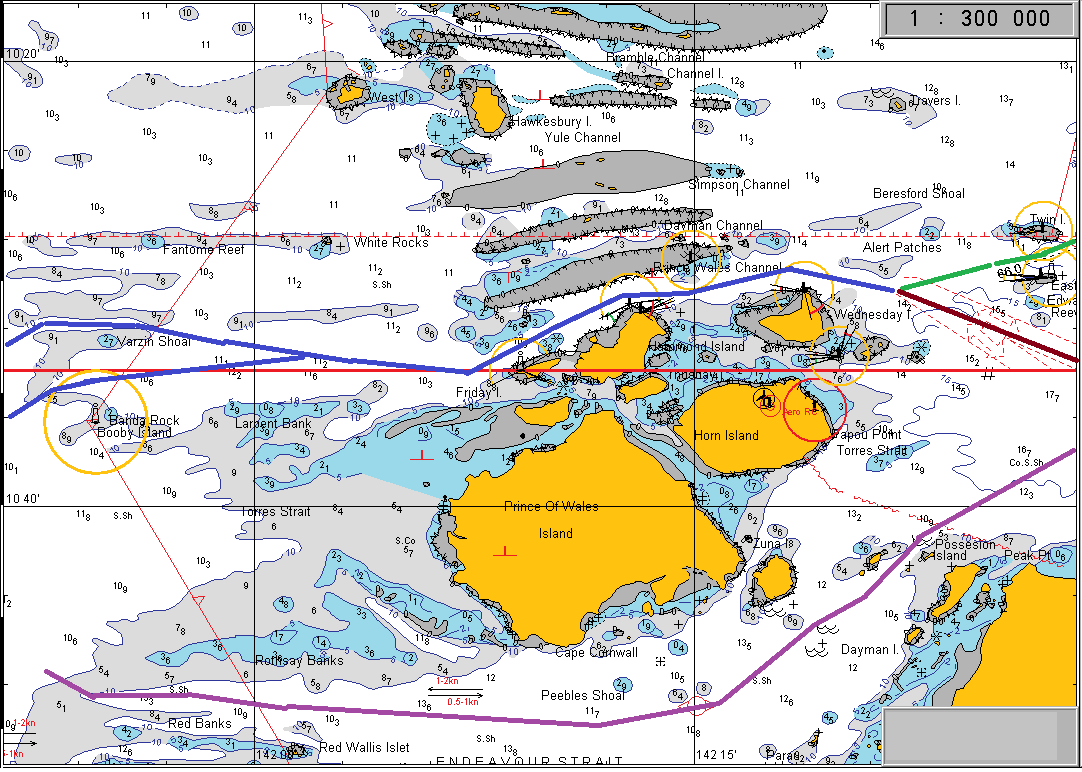
Navigation Routes through the Torres Strait

The two routes through the Strait are:

- Endeavour Strait (purple line on chart) – for small vessels.
- Prince of Wales Channel: Larger ships transiting Torres Strait enter the Prince of Wales Channel from the West just north of Booby Island by way of the Gannet or Varzin Passages. The minimum depths for deep draught shipping in the Great Barrier Reef pilotage area are found here (10.3 m or 34 ft – Nov 2011). Shipping with a 12.2 m (40 ft) static draught or less are permitted to transit the area.
  - Channels to the East of Prince of Wales Channel
    - Great North East Channel: East of Prince of Wales Channel at Wednesday Island the Route becomes The Great North East Channel (green line on chart). The Great North East Channel (GNEC) links the Prince of Wales Channel to the northernmost entrance to the Great Barrier Reef, 120 NM away at Bligh Entrance. The GNEC route runs North or South of Alert Patches and East to under Twin Island then Northeast to Dalrymple Island (the end of Pilotage requirement) then on to Bramble Quay, Bligh Entrance and the open sea. This passage routes shipping to the Coral Sea, the Pacific Ocean and the outside of the Great Barrier Reef. Another channel (brown line on chart) runs down towards Cape York.
    - Inner Route Pilotage Area: The Inner Route Pilotage Area runs from near Cape York to near Cairns. This channel, named the 'Inner Route' runs between the Australian mainland and the Great Barrier Reef

== In literature ==
Torres Strait is mentioned in Jules Verne's 1870 novel Twenty Thousand Leagues Under the Seas as a dangerous strait where the submarine, the Nautilus, is briefly stranded.

== See also ==
- Birds of Boigu, Saibai and Dauan Islands (Torres Strait)
- Torres Strait Islands
- Torres Strait Treaty – Treaty between Australia and Papua New Guinea that set the maritime boundary between the two nations in the Torres Strait
