= Somerset Graves Site =

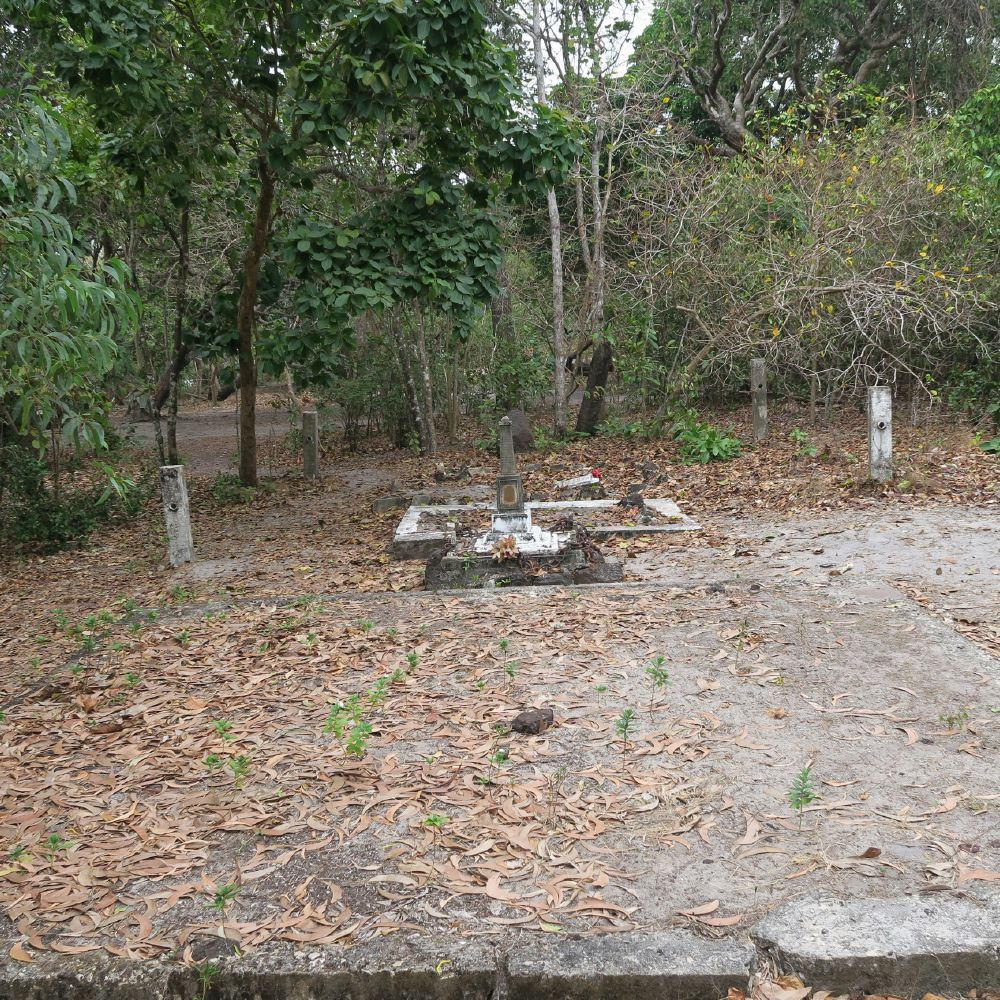
- Jardine Graves, facing south-east, 2017

- Location within Queensland
- 10.7409°S 142.5925°E
- Location: Somerset, Northern Peninsula Area Region, Queensland, Australia

Queensland Heritage Register
- Official name: Somerset Graves Site; Somerset Jardine Cemetery
- Type: state heritage
- Designated: 25 January 2018
- Reference no.: 650072

Somerset Graves Site is a heritage-listed cemetery at Somerset, Northern Peninsula Area Region, Queensland, Australia. It is also known as Somerset Jardine Cemetery. It was added to the Queensland Heritage Register on 25 January 2018.

== History ==
The 2,379-square-metre (25,610 sq ft) Somerset Graves Site, on the northwest edge of Somerset Bay, Cape York, is known to contain seven marked interments, including the graves of Francis (Frank) Lascelles Jardine (1919), three members of his family (c. 1901, 1923, 1962), two pearl divers (1890, 1909), and an unidentified grave; as well as a memorial to Frank and Sana Jardine (1924); and the Kennedy Memorial Monument (1948). The site is a remnant of the original settlement of the town of Somerset, established in 1864 as a joint venture between the Queensland Government and the British Government as a port of refuge and refuelling depot. The known burials date from 1890 to 1962. The site has the potential to contribute knowledge that will lead to a greater understanding of Somerset's inhabitants and burial practices. It has a special association with the Jardine family, early settlers of Cape York Peninsula.

With its separation from New South Wales on 10 December 1859, the new colony of Queensland acquired over 5,000 kilometres (3,100 mi) of coastline extending as far north as Cape York Peninsula. The colony's first parliament passed a resolution in 1860 favouring direct connection with England via the Torres Strait. In December 1861, Sir George Ferguson Bowen (1821–99), Governor of Queensland (1859–67), described the necessity for a station in the far north of Queensland. From a naval and military point of view, a post at or near Cape York would be valuable, due to the establishment of a French colony and naval station in New Caledonia. Bowen informed Henry Pelham-Clinton, 5th Duke of Newcastle, Secretary of State for the Colonies, that the government of Queensland would be willing to undertake the formation and management of a station at Cape York and to support a civil establishment there.

On 27 August 1862, Bowen left Brisbane on HMS Pioneer to select an eligible site for the proposed settlement. The chosen site, opposite Albany Island, was named Somerset, in honour of the First Lord of the Admiralty, Edward Seymour, 12th Duke of Somerset.

Tenders were called for the construction of government buildings in March 1863, a town survey was undertaken in July 1864 and the Town Reserve of Somerset was established on 8 July 1864. A survey plan dated 13 March 1865 included Parcel 24, within which the graves are located. Parcel 24 comprised approximately five acres (2.0 hectares). The first Somerset land sale was held in Brisbane on 4 April 1865 and a second sale took place on 2 May 1866. Land parcels sold at these auctions were about one acre (0.40 hectares) in size, so did not include parcel number 24.

Earlier, in February 1864, John Jardine (1807–74) was appointed Somerset's first Police Magistrate and Commissioner of Crown Lands and in July 1864 he was appointed District Registrar for the District of North Cook. An early sketch of Somerset by Jardine shows the Government Residence, Police Magistrate's House and Customs House on the southern side of Somerset Bay, and Marines' Barracks and the Medical Superintendent's House on the northern side. Henry Simpson succeeded Jardine as Police Magistrate in 1866. The Marines were withdrawn in 1867 and replaced with Native Police.

John Jardine was the father of Francis (Frank) Lascelles Jardine (1841–1919) and Alexander (Alick) William Jardine (1843–1920) who, between May 1864 and March 1865, undertook an overland expedition from Rockhampton to Cape York which was described at the time as, geographically:

"solving the question of the course of the northern rivers emptying into the Gulf of Carpentaria of which nothing was known but their outlets. It has also made known...how much ... or rather, how little, of the 'York Peninsula' is adapted for pastoral occupation, whilst its success in taking the first stock overland, and forming a cattle station at Newcastle Bay, has ensured to the Settlement at Somerset a necessary and welcome supply of fresh meat...".

The Jardine River was named after them by order of Governor Bowen. For their pioneering exploratory efforts the Jardine brothers were made Fellows of the Royal Geographical Society and awarded the Society's Murchison Award, in 1886.

Several Indigenous groups occupied this region prior to European contact. In an 1896 report to the Queensland Government, Archibald Meston estimated that in the 1870s the Indigenous population between Newcastle Bay (10.8857°S 142.6014°E) and Cape York was around 3000. At the time of writing his report, he believed that the population had fallen to around 300. This rapid decline was caused by a number of factors, including introduced disease, exclusions from traditional hunting grounds and frontier violence. Reverend Frederick Charles Jagg, a missionary at Somerset appointed by the Society for the Propagation of the Gospel, gave an indication of the relationship between European and Indigenous peoples when he reported in 1867 that "The aborigines have been described as the most degraded, treacherous and bloodthirsty beings in existence by the present Police Magistrate, and those whose only idea is to shoot them down whenever they were seen".

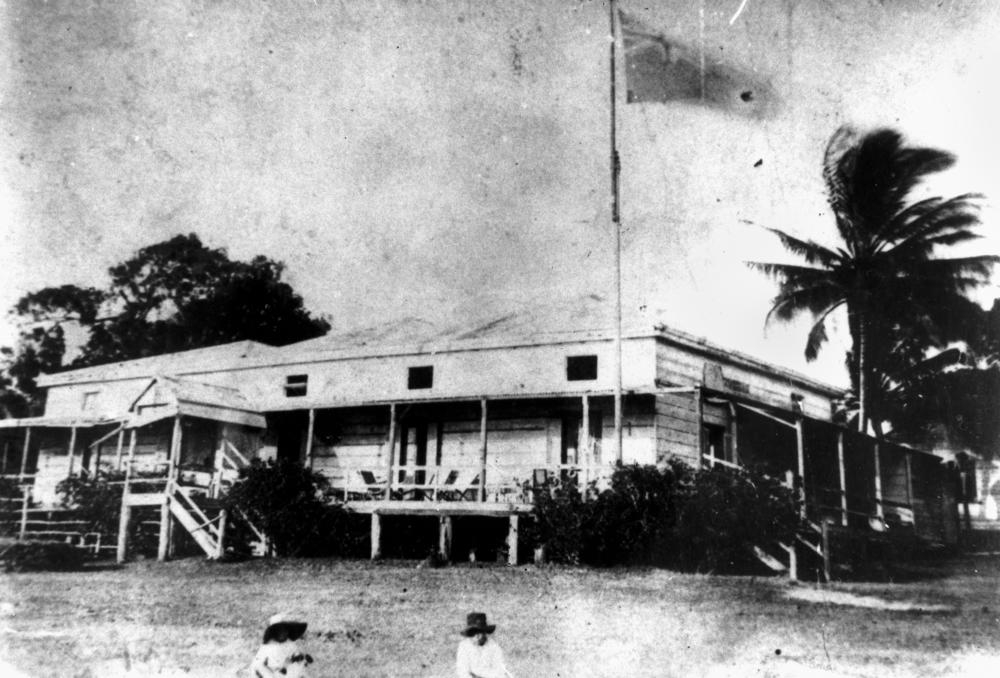
Frank Jardine's home, the former Government Resident's House at Somerset, Cape York Peninsula

Frank Jardine was appointed as a Magistrate in December 1867 and as Police Magistrate and Inspector of Police at Somerset in April 1868. In 1869 he held the positions of District Registrar for Somerset, Police Magistrate, Clerk of Petty Sessions, Inspector of Police and Postmaster. He married Samoan woman, Sana Sofala, in 1873 and the couple had four children: Alice Maule Lascelles, Hew Cholmondeley (Chum), Bootle Arthur Lascelles (Bertie) and Elizabeth Sana Hamilton. Frank Jardine's tenure as a government officer in Somerset was not without controversy. The local Indigenous population was dispossessed and there was hostility between them and the Jardine family; both during Frank and Alick Jardine's expedition to Somerset, and during the years of the settlement. Jardine was also suspended for a time from his duties as Police Magistrate whilst being investigated in relation to using his position to obtain a pearl diving licence.

Somerset became redundant as a port once a safer shipping route to the Torres Strait was found and a settlement on Thursday Island was built from 1876. Frank Jardine continued to live at Somerset, maintaining the police residence until his death there in March 1919. During this time, Jardine continued to maintain a beef cattle herd; was engaged in the pearling industry; and created a coconut/copra plantation at Somerset. Due to Somerset's isolated location the Jardine family provided assistance and hospitality to travellers and seafarers, for example, Jardine aided the survivors of the shipwreck of RMS Quetta in 1890.

Jardine was buried in the south area of the Somerset Grave Site in 1919, and his grave protected by a timber fence. His wife, Sana, who died in 1923, was buried nearby. A memorial to Frank and Sana Jardine was installed in 1924 by their family. In 1935 the graves of Frank and Sana Jardine were described as lying side by side, surmounted by tombstones and surrounded by a fence made out of old ship's timber and anchor chains. Buried in close proximity is Frank Jardine's grandson, (Cholmondeley) Gordon Vidgen (1903–1962). Other graves in this part of the Somerset Grave Site are said to be of Sana's mother (c. 1901) and possibly two children.

Jardine was not the first to be buried in the Somerset Grave Site (labelled section one when the parcel of land was leased as Special Lease 2894 in early 1920 by Frank's son, Bertie Jardine). The earliest known burial was that of Cancan, a pearl diver, dating to 1890. Japanese pearl diver Kobori Itchimatsu was also buried there in 1909. Both graves are situated in the north area of the site. The pearl diving industry was important in Torres Strait and to the Queensland economy, and came to be dominated by Japanese divers after 1891. Kobori Itchimatsu came from the village of Nishi Mukai in Wakayama prefecture, an area that provided 80 per cent of the 7000 Japanese who left their country to become pearl divers.

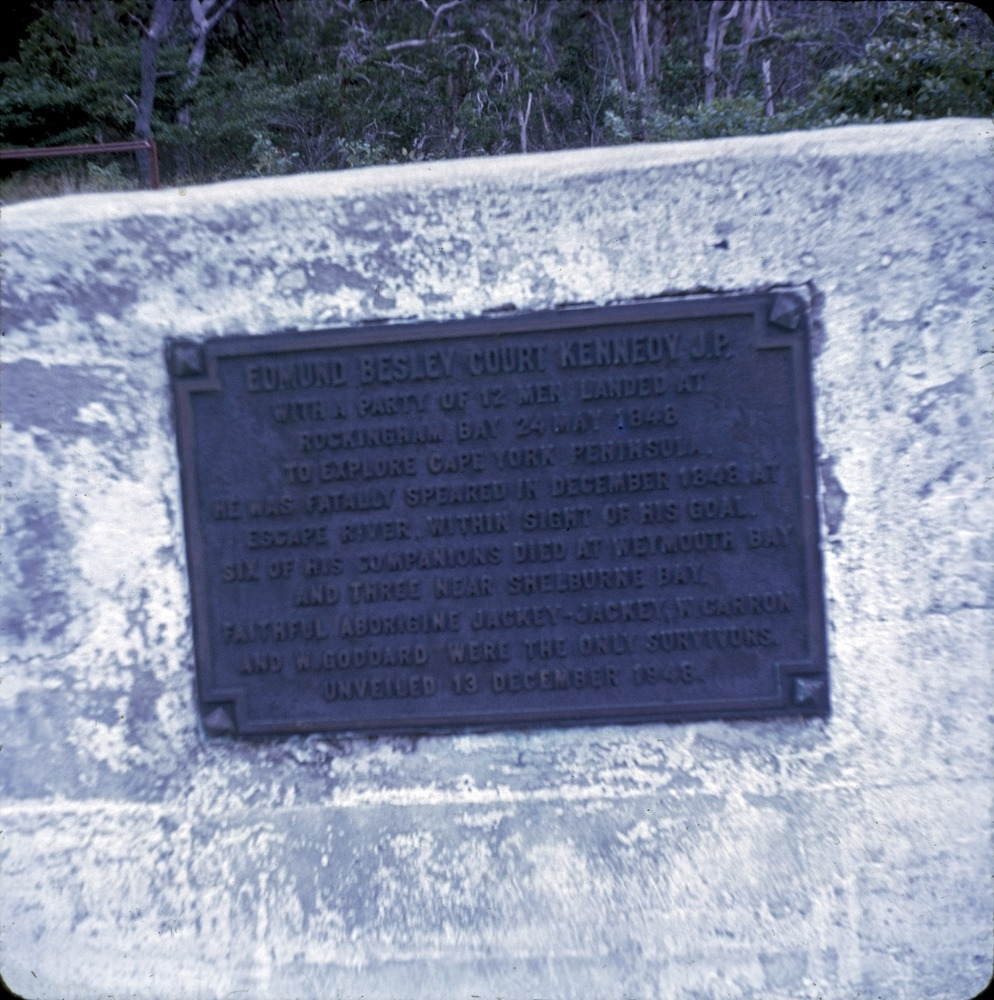
Memorial plaque for Edmund Kennedy, circa 1969

The Kennedy Memorial Monument, also within the Somerset Graves Site, located beside the path between the north and south areas of the site was unveiled on 13 December 1948 in commemoration of the 100th anniversary of Edmund Besley Court Kennedy's unsuccessful exploration of Cape York Peninsula. The monument comprises a concrete slab on a concrete footing with a bronze commemorative plaque on its eastern face.

There is limited evidence about other burial sites at Somerset. The principal source for information about them is Frank Reid (1884–1947) who gives conflicting information about the number and location of burial sites. His book, based on a visit to Somerset c. 1917 and published in 1954, provides a map of the cemetery sites at Somerset and on Albany Island - showing that the lone grave of Captain Archibald McAusland (22 Mar 1874) is located on high ground to the east of Somerset Bay, while about 40 European graves exist in a hill-side cemetery outside the boundary of the township, to the west of Frank Jardine's residence and south of the Somerset Graves Site. However, the text accompanying this map and a newspaper article from 1937 quoting Reid, talk of only one other cemetery site at Somerset in addition to the Somerset Graves Site, and imply that McAusland was buried with the other Europeans. Reid states the interments in the second cemetery are: two Royal Marines, several Burketown residents, who were brought to Somerset to recover from fever, but who died soon after arrival, and Madame Boisse, wife of a commandant at New Caledonia. Public records show other deaths occurred at Somerset, including the two infant daughters of Somerset's medical officer, Dr Timotheus John Haran, RN.

Following the death of their parents, sons Bertie and Chum leased section 12 (on which the former Police Magistrate's house was located) and section one under special lease arrangements. In 1948, the area under Special Lease 2984 (section one) was described as having been leased by Bertie Jardine for "sentimental purposes, where his father and mother were buried...". At this time, section one was incorporated into R.10, a Reserve for the Benefit of Aboriginals, which also included the Somerset town reserve. In 1973, R.10 was reduced in size and become two lots, including Lot 43 Plan SO65 (which included the Somerset Graves Site). Finally, in July 1999, Lot 43 Plan SO65 was cancelled and the current lot, Lot 7 SP104552 was created. This newly created lot captured all known or marked graves.

In 2011 the Angkamuthi Seven Rivers, the McDonnell Atampaya and the Gudang/Yadhaigana groups made an application for native title determination over the Northern Peninsula Area Regional Council and Cook Shire areas, covering an area of approximately 685,642 hectares. The determination was handed down on 30 October 2014. Lot 7 SP104552 is contained within the exclusive areas of the determination.

In 2017, the Somerset Graves Site remains as a remnant of the once-important regional centre of Somerset. It is the burial site of Frank Jardine, a well-known far north Queensland identity, members of his family, and other identified and unidentified members of the isolated Cape York community.

== Description ==
The Somerset Graves Site comprising Lot 7 SP104552 is located immediately inland of the northern section of Somerset Bay, Cape York. Within the lot are two areas of graves: the north grave area and the south grave area. Due to dense vegetation (which is not significant) the north grave area is not visible from the south grave area and vice versa. The north grave area contains the graves of two pearl divers and the south grave area contains the graves of Jardine family members. The south grave area is accessed by a sand track which connects to Somerset Road. The north grave area is accessed from the beach of Somerset Bay or a narrow sand track from the south grave area. The north grave area, located directly inland from the beach of Somerset Bay, has experienced considerable sand deposition. On the track between the two grave areas is the Kennedy Memorial Monument.

Two marked graves were identified within the north grave area. According to a 1987 survey by the Material Culture Unit of the James Cook University a third unmarked grave is located between the two marked graves, however, due to considerable sand accumulation the unmarked grave was unable to be identified. The first marked grave, located in the north-western section of the north grave area belongs to "Cancan". The grave consists of a marble headstone 50.5 centimetres (19.9 in) wide and 92 centimetres (36 in) high from the current ground level. There is a transverse crack across the headstone which is held together by fencing wire and a star picket. There are the remains of bounding beach rocks around the grave, however, only the eastern extent, located 310 centimetres (120 in) from the headstone, is clearly discernible. The headstone has the following inscription:

SACRED TO THE MEMORY OF CANCAN - (A GOOD MAN AND TRUE ) - DIED JUNE 21. 1890 - AGED 32 YEARS.

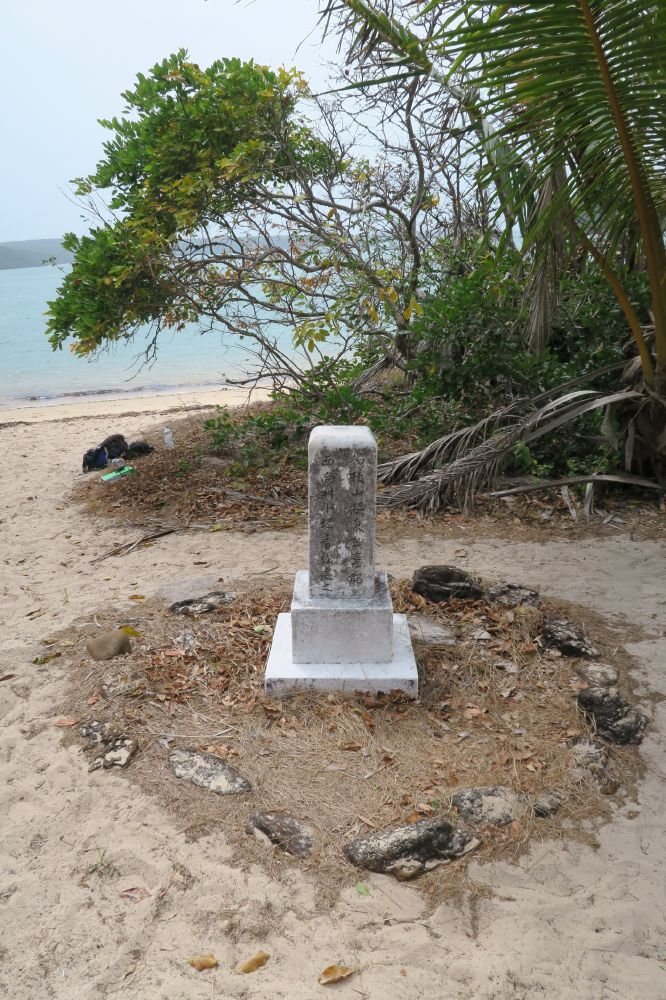
Kobori Ichimatsu's grave, facing east, 2017

The second marked grave of the north grave area belongs to Kobori Ichimatsu. The grave is located in the middle of the southern section of the grave area. The grave consists of a concrete cenotaph, placed on a stepped base which is wider than the cenotaph and has a height of 33.5 centimetres (13.2 in). The cenotaph is 24 by 24 centimetres (9.4 by 9.4 in) wide and 61 centimetres (24 in) high. The top articulation of the cenotaph is chamfered. The monument is not placed in the centre of the concrete base but appears to be deliberately offset, although this may be the result of repair work. The cenotaph is surrounded by local beach rocks in an elliptical shape approximately 1.4 metres (4 ft 7 in) (north/south) by 1.9 metres (6 ft 3 in) (east/west). The monument has been painted in a white lime wash. There is an inscription on three faces of the monument (the east, south and west faces). The inscription is in Japanese and has been painted black. The black paint has discoloured the monument face. The following is a translation of the inscription:

Southern face - Kobori [Family name] Ichimatsu's [First name] grave

Eastern face - Meiji Forty Two [forty second year of the Emperor Meiji - which is the year 1909] spring died

Western face - Wakayama prefecture Higashi [east] ___ city - Nishi Mukai village - Kobori [Family name] Otomatsu [First name] built

The Kennedy Memorial Monument is located on the track between the north and south grave areas. The monument consists of a concrete slab on a stepped concrete footing on a beach rock base. The concrete slab is 91.5 centimetres (36.0 in) wide by 59 centimetres (23 in) deep and 121 centimetres (48 in) high. The monument appears to be pre-formed concrete and is painted in a white acrylic paint. The concrete footing is cracked on the south-east and north-east corners. The top, eastern and northern faces have been discoloured by lichen. The slab has a slight lean towards the north. There is a bronze plaque on the eastern face commemorating the Kennedy Expedition. The plaque has the following embossed inscription:

Edmund Besley Court Kennedy J.P. with a party of 12 men landed at Rockhampton Bay 24 May 1848 to explore Cape York Peninsula. He was fatally speared in December 1848 at Escape River within sight of his goal. Six of his companions died at Waymouth Bay and three near Shelbourne Bay. Faithful aborigine Jackey-Jackey, E. Carron and W. Goddard were the only survivors. Unveiled 13 December 1948.

The south grave area contains the remains of Jardine family members. There are four marked graves and one memorial. Only one grave has an inscription indicating who is buried in the grave. The first marked grave, located at the northern extent of this grave area consists of a roughly carved stone grave marker painted with a white lime wash. The headstone is 27 centimetres (11 in) wide (at its widest point) and 48 centimetres (19 in) high. There is no inscription on this grave marker to identify its occupant; however, from the size of the grave it may belong to a child. The grave is surrounded by beach rock and is approximately 170 centimetres (67 in) long by 101 centimetres (40 in) wide. Within the rock surrounds is a soil fill decorated with a circle of iron chain, shells (mainly oyster shells) and pieces of coral have been placed within the chain circle. Historical references refer to a fence made out of old ships' timbers and anchor chains surrounding the site; several of the graves, including this northern one have been decorated with thick iron chain. The grave is separated from, and orientated perpendicular to the other graves in this area, along a north–south rather than east–west orientation.

The next most northerly grave is considerably larger than all the other graves in this area, measuring 430 centimetres (170 in) (north/south) by 447 centimetres (176 in) (east/west). According to family knowledge this grave is a family plot and belongs to Frank Jardine (southern section of the grave) and possibly Sana's mother (northern section of the grave). The considerable size of the grave supports this. The grave has a concrete border. Within the concrete border are rocks, and the centre of the feature appears to be a soil fill. It is possible that the concrete was added to reinforce the boundary rocks.

Next to this large grave is a memorial to Frank Jardine and Sana Jardine. The memorial is set on a beach rock footing. Set on top of the footing is a concrete base with short concrete posts reinforced by metal, located around the edge of the base which is 94 by 91 centimetres (37 by 36 in) wide. A chain has been used to surround this base and the links in the chain have been placed over these short posts. Within this base is a concrete cenotaph. The cenotaph appears to be pre-cast and has a stepped base of three levels which has been painted with white acrylic paint. On the northern face of the base of the cenotaph is a bronze plaque which is inscribed with:

A.D. 1924/B.L. Jardine

On top of this base is the cenotaph which appears to have been designed to look like a brick stack. There is a large crack along the northern face of the monument. The cenotaph (including the base) measures 124 centimetres (49 in) high. Each face of the cenotaph contains a rebated space for a bronze plaque, but only two plaques on the southern and northern face remain.

Southern plaque: In loving memory of my dear mother. Died 21st Sept. 1923.

Northern plaque: In loving memory of my dear father. Died 10st March. 1919.

The memorial is believed to have been placed between the graves of Frank and Sana Jardine. The identification of their graves is supported by the remaining plaques of the memorial - the southern face plaque is dedicated to Sana and faces what is believed to be Sana's grave, and the northern face plaque is dedicated to Frank and faces what is believed to be Frank's grave.

The grave on the southern side of this monument is believed to be Sana Jardine's grave. This identification is based on family knowledge. This grave is enclosed by regular concrete blocks painted with white acrylic paint. Within these blocks are beach stones - most apparent at the western and eastern extent of the grave. The grave measures 264 centimetres (104 in) long by 183 centimetres (72 in) wide. The grave has a soil fill with coral pieces placed within the grave area.

The final grave of the south grave area is the only one with an inscribed headstone. It belongs to Cholmondeley Gordon Vidgen, Sana and Frank's grandson, who died in December 1962. The grave is surrounded by pieces of irregular, broken concrete blocks. The extent of the grave delineated by the concrete blocks is 300 centimetres (120 in) long by 180 centimetres (71 in) wide. The grave has a soil fill and a plaque has been placed at its western extent. Above the plaque is a small glass vase. A chain, similar to that used in other graves of the site (and may be related to the chain that originally surrounded the site) has been placed around the plaque. The plaque has a cross engraved onto its southern edge. The marble inset into the concrete plaque has the following inscription:

Dec. 1962. Here lies Gordon Vidgen. True son of the North. Always remembered by his wife and children.

Both grave areas are surrounded by reinforced concrete posts which create two rectangular enclosures around the grave areas. Four posts surround the north grave area and 10 posts surround the south grave area. The posts are painted white. There are tubular steel rail openings in the posts. Barbed wire is evident through the openings of some the posts in the south grave area. The style of the posts varies, possibly indicating replacement over time.

== Heritage listing ==
Somerset Graves Site was listed on the Queensland Heritage Register on 25 January 2018 having satisfied the following criteria.

The place is important in demonstrating the evolution or pattern of Queensland's history.

As a remnant of the Somerset settlement, the Somerset Graves Site (1890–1962) is important in demonstrating the early initiative of the Queensland Government to create a settlement and port on Cape York for maritime, civil and military purposes. From 1864 until 1876, Somerset acted as the regional centre for Cape York. Afterwards it remained one of the few Cape York settlements available to provide assistance to travellers and seafarers. This early settlement was also the site of conflict between Europeans and traditional owners; and was associated with the pearling industry in the Torres Strait, and early attempts at pastoralism and agriculture on Cape York.

The pearl divers' graves in the Somerset Graves Site are representative of the important and hazardous Queensland pearling industry, which operated from the 1870s and relied upon a multi-ethnic work force.

The place has potential to yield information that will contribute to an understanding of Queensland's history.

The Somerset Graves Site has the potential to contribute knowledge that will lead to a greater understanding of Somerset's inhabitants and burial practices. There is limited information about the deaths and burials of Somerset's inhabitants. The Somerset Graves Site is known to contain seven marked graves and at least one unmarked grave and it is possible that a larger number of Somerset's inhabitants were interred at this site. Archaeological investigation of the graves site has the potential to reveal the presence, nature and extent of burials at this site, their spatial distribution and arrangement, as well as the burial practices of the diverse inhabitants of the settlement.

The place has a special association with the life or work of a particular person, group or organisation of importance in Queensland's history.

The Somerset Graves Site, which includes the known graves of at least three Jardine family members, has a special association with the Jardine family, who were closely connected with the European exploration, settlement and development of Cape York from 1864 until the mid-20th century.

Members of the Jardine family had a lengthy, and at times controversial, connection to the area. John Jardine snr and his son Francis (Frank) Lascelles Jardine held important government positions based at Somerset. The Jardine brothers, Francis (Frank) Lascelles and Alexander (Alick) William, were early overland explorers from Rockhampton to Somerset, bringing the first cattle into Cape York. As a result of this feat, the Jardine River was named after them, and in 1886 they were made Fellows of the Royal Geographical Society and received its Murchison Award.
