= Gumakudin =

Aboriginal Australian people

The Gumakudin were an indigenous Aboriginal tribe of the Cape York Peninsula. They may have been a sub-clan of the Yadhaigana. They were decimated during the earlier period of colonisation of northern Queensland.

== History ==
The Gumakudin's territory lay southwest from their borders with the Gudang tribe down to the Jardine River, and encompassed Utingu, Alau and Injinoo. The argument that they were a sub-clan of the Yadhaigana is based on an inference from the fact that the Torres Strait Islander group, the Kaurareg, drew no distinction between the two, calling them both "Kangaroo faces" (Yegilli).

The few Gumakudin who survived both colonial punitive policies and the hostilities, often fomented by whites, with other tribes such as the Yadhaigana, eventually were absorbed into the latter.

== Notes and references ==
=== References ===
- Sharp, Nonie (1992). Footprints Along the Cape York Sandbeaches. Aboriginal Studies Press. ISBN 978-0-855-75230-9.
