= Kaurareg =

Torres Strait Islander group of people

Kaurareg people
- aka: Kauraraiga, Kaurarega, Kowrarega, Kauralaig, Kauraleg, Kororega, Korariga, Kauralaigna, Malulaig, Muralug (name of part of Prince of Wales Island), and Muralag (AIATSIS), nd (SIL)
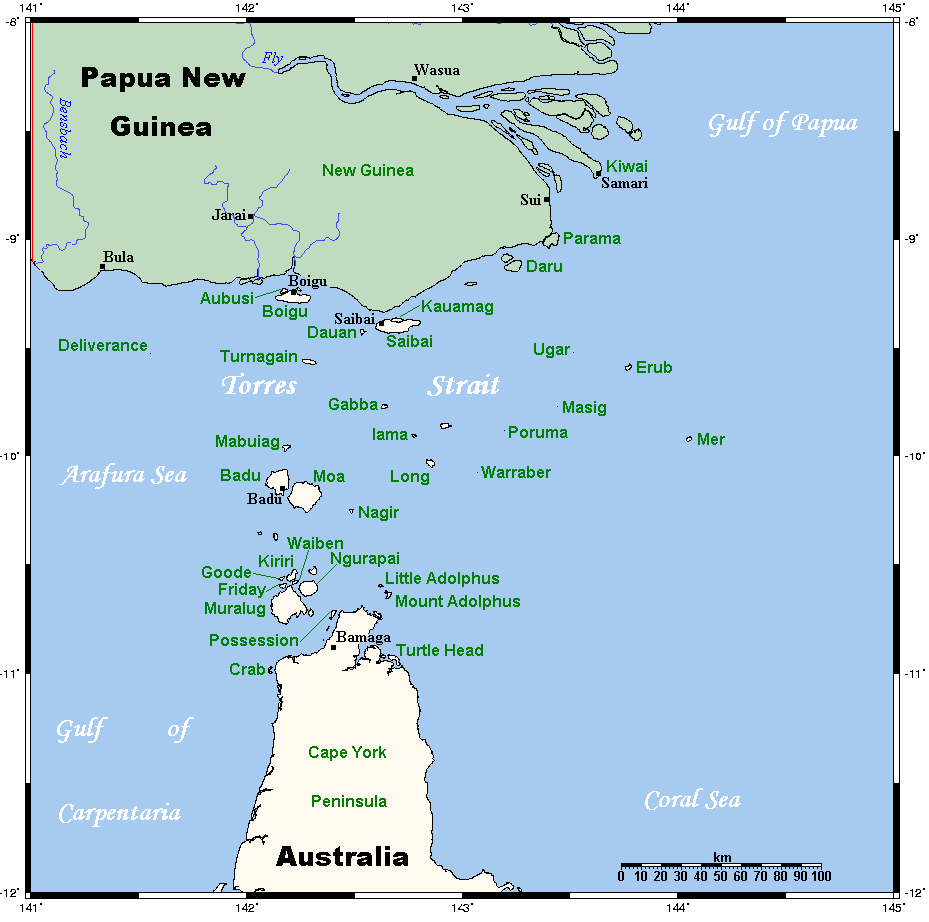
- A map of the Torres Strait Islands, with the Kaurareg traditional country located in the middle band of islands

Hierarchy
- Language family: Pama–Nyungan
- Language branch/group: Western and Central Torres Strait Language
- Group dialect: Kauraraigau Ya

Area
- Bioregion: Cape York Peninsula
- Location: Torres Strait Islands, Far North Queensland, Australia
- Coordinates: 10°41′02″S 142°11′06″E
- Islands: Prince of Wales Island Archipelago

Kaurareg (alt. Kauraraiga, plural Kauraraigalai, Kauraregale) is the name for one of the Indigenous Australian and Papuan groups collectively known as Torres Strait Islander peoples, although some identify as Aboriginal Australians. They are the traditional owners of Thursday Island (Waiben) as well as a number of Torres Strait Islands.

The Kaurareg are lower Western Islanders, based on the Muralag group. In common with the other peoples of the Torres Strait Island, they commanded impressive sailing outrigger canoe technology, traded throughout the Straits, fishing and trading with other Torres Strait Island groups. Similarly, they also regularly visited the Australian mainland of Cape York Peninsula, and retained ceremonial, marriage and trading alliances with several Aboriginal groups there. However they have been displaced many times since colonisation in the late 1800s. Subject to reprisals after being blamed for an incident in which a Western schooner and its crew were destroyed in 1869, their numbers rapidly diminished with the onset of white colonisation and administration. After World War II, descendants of the Kaurareg began to return to their traditional islands, and lay claim to native title over several of them.

== Language ==
The Kaurareg speak a dialect of Kalaw Lagaw Ya, an isolate in the Pama–Nyungan family.

== Torres Island historical context ==
The Kaurareg lie in the lower Western island group among the 5 basic ethno-culturally distinct groups that constituted the traditional world of the Torres Strait Islanders, the others being the Saibailgal, Dœwanalgal and Bœigulgal (Top West islanders), the Maluigal (Mid-West islanders), Kulkalgal (Central Islanders) and Meriam Le (Eastern Islanders). Though internecine conflict was chronic in the region, it did not disrupt the dynamic interlocking family, clan and trading system that linked all in a far-flung exchange system, whose goods extended beyond the islands creating a flow of goods between New Guinea and Cape York Peninsula. The Kaurareg and the Mua traded bu (trumpet shells), alup (bailer shells) and wap (turtle and dugong harpoon shafts) for Papuan canoe hulls, cassowary bone-tipped arrows and bamboo for various purposes, such as carrying water and making knives for beheading enemies (upi).

The Kaurareg had close links with the tribes of northern Cape York, which was home to a number of Aboriginal groups. These were the Gudang whose territory extended from Cape York to Fly Point; the Gumakudin whose land was to the southwest of Cape York; the Unduyamo who were in the northern part of Newcastle Bay, and the Yadhaigana whose country went from Jackey Jackey Creek to Escape River. A.C.Haddon, surveying the field reports of the ethnography to date, esp. the narratives collected by Gunnar Landtman, classified the Kaurareg as descendants of the ancient Hiamu people of the island of Daru off the southern Papuan coast. These Hiamu in turn, according to folk history, had come from Iama in the Bourke Isles. The Hiamu, it was said, were repeatedly worsted in encounters with Kiwai invaders, and abandoned Daru and moved to Muralag.

== History of contact with westerners ==
The Kaurareg people were extensively documented before their decimation and the destruction of their traditional life, by O. W. Brierly, an artist who took part in an Admiralty survey of the York Peninsula by HMS Rattlesnake. He estimated the number of Kaurareg on Muralag (Prince of Wales Island) alone as around 100, though they were also spread over another 10 islands and islets. In particular he took many notes based on interviews with Barbara Thompson, a castaway who, the lone survivor of a shipwreck off Ngurupai (Horn Island) in 1844, was held captive by the Kaurareg, who treated her as the markai ("ancestral spirit" ) of an elder (Peaqui)'s deceased daughter (Giom) for 5 years until Owen Stanley's expedition Deliverance Beach where Barbara Thompson was rescued by sailors from Rattlesnake on 16 October 1849. They were also the object of extensive research undertaken by Alfred Cort Haddon in 1888, and again in 1898 when he led the Cambridge Anthropological Expedition to Torres Strait.

=== 18th century: Fresh water source ===
Muralag had been noted as a source of fresh water since the days of early British expeditions. In 1791, Captain E. Edwards and the crew of HMS Pandora arrived in four boats on the island, seeking fresh water after the Pandora was wrecked on a reef.

=== 1869: Sperwer incident and reprisals ===
In mid-April 1869 a schooner, the Sperwer, while trading and trawling for trepang off Muralag, was attacked and its captain, James Gascoyne, and his crew of two whites and five Malays were killed. The incident occurred at Wednesday Spit between Wednesday Island and Hammond Island, an area where, it was later reported, the Indigenous peoples "had constantly maintained friendly intercourse" with Europeans.

Three Kaurareg men were captured, found guilty and executed by the native police led by police magistrate in Somerset at that time, Henry Chester. His successor, pastoralist Frank Jardine, set out on a punitive expedition seconded by a Captain McAusland of the Melanie and his crew of kanakas (native police (Note: Note: Needs checking – Aboriginal or Islander people?)). According to Jardine's son, the armed kanakas ran amok, and a great slaughter of Kaurareg on Muralag is thought to have taken place, though accounts differ. Jardine, led additional attacks against the Kaurareg people on the island during the 1870s.

Jardine soon afterwards went on leave, and Chester, who took over as the resident government administrator, took further measures against them. Misinformed that Gascoyne's wife and child were living with the Kaurareg, he had kidnapped a Kaurareg elder, Passiwapod, as a pawn to ransom in exchange for the Gascoynes. The elder was released when the information proved to be false; the Gascoynes were in Melbourne.

In April 1870 Chester again set forth in HMS Blanche with 25 royal marines and eight Australian native police, five of whom were recently released from St Helena's prison where they had served time for rape and armed robbery. The site of the Muralag massacre was examined, 20 other islanders taken prisoners, one severely wounded, and all but two of their canoes burnt. This time the men turned out to be Kulkalaig from Nagir. Cape York Gudang aboriginals with Chester identified three Kulkalaig men as the culprits behind the Sperwer incident, and, on learning this, Chester had the three summarily executed. It is widely thought that the Kaurareg were indeed uninvolved, though the reprisal visited on them for it was responsible for their decimation.

=== 1880s–20th century: survival ===
Kaurareg survivors were encountered in the 1880s at Yata (Port Lihou) and at Kiwain (Blue Fish Point) opposite Thursday Island, and at the close of the century their numbers were reduced to a hundred or so. The remnants of the Kaurareg were then shifted to Kiriri/Hammond Island, and later to Moa Island (Adam) in the 1920s, and Puruma/Coconut Island.

The Anglican Reverend Canon John Done, who had arrived as a missionary in 1915 and was much impressed by the Torres Islanders spirituality, noted in 1919 the 80 remaining Kauraregs' desperate situation – the worst of all the Islanders – and by 1920 they had been reduced to 67, after influenza swept the area. In March 1922 the Kaurareg were again moved at gunpoint to Moa Island, where they remained until 1947. In 1947 the elder Elikiam Tom insisted on returning to Kiriri, but, denied residence by the Catholic Mission because he refused to convert, he went over to Horn Island (Narupai) where, together with Kaurareg elders from Moa, the returnees built what became Wasaga village. The Department of Native Affairs tried to shift them to Red Island Point on the mainland, but they managed to resist further displacement.

A large population of Kaurareg people still lives on Horn Island, and Elders have continued to fight for connection to the remaining islands within what they consider as their homelands.

== Traditional lands ==
After the enactment of the Native Title Act 1993, in May 1996, the Kaurareg people lodged five native title claims with the National Native Title Tribunal over parts of the following islands:

- Muralag (Prince of Wales Island)
- Nurupai (Horn Island)
- Tarilag (Packe Island)
- Damaralag (Dumuralug Islet)
- Mipa (Pipa Islet, also known as Turtle Island)
- Yeta (Port Lihou Island)
- Zuna (Entrance Island)

In 2001 a federal court ruled to return the seven islands to Kaurareg control.

Administered by the Aboriginal and Torres Strait Islander Commission (ATSIC) and the Torres Strait Regional Authority (TSRA), the Kaurareg declared their independence from Australia in 2002, after regaining native title over their ancestral land. They call their lands the United Isles of Kaiwalagal.

Historical records indicate that the Kaurareg Aboriginal people are the traditional owners for Thursday Island; however there are (as of 2018) no active native title claims over this area. The Kaurareg people refer to Thursday Island as "Waibene". For thousands of years the Kaurareg followed traditional patterns of hunting, fishing and agriculture and maintained close cultural and trading ties with the Aboriginal groups of the Northern Peninsula Area of Cape York.

== Identity and recognition ==
The Karuareg and Torres Strait communities have always lived alongside each other, and have close inter-familial and cultural ties. However, Kaurareg people reported feeling neglected by ATSIC and TSRA, and "caught in the middle of a power struggle". This led to questions of identity among the people, who mostly do not view themselves as Torres Strait Islanders but as Aboriginal Australians.

A 2012 community forum identified that

Kaurareg Aboriginal people have suffered cultural prejudice from the wider community but also within the local community. Historically they are a nation of people dispossessed of their traditional lands, culture and language. There has been little acknowledgement of the Kaurareg Aboriginal people from the people who settled on their traditional lands. This has caused immense tension, anger and hurt and people feel they are still fighting for the appropriate recognition.

The forum found that community fragmentation, followed by loss of culture and identity, disempowerment and government systems, were the things affecting the Kaurareg people negatively the most.

== Traditional practices ==
The Kaurareg distinguish at least six kinds of tide. Knowing where to hunt and fish, and in which kinds of currents, allows the Kaurareg access to a wide range of seafood. A strong ethic of sustainability means that over-hunting is punished. Kaurareg marine lore teaches "one can fish successfully only when one is hungry".

The story of these people was featured in the SBS television program Living Black. Kaurareg men were long-haired and went naked, save for as belt, while the women, apart from periods of mourning when it was removed, and replaced by a soger (long fringed skirt) wore a leaf petticoat (zazi), and had closely cropped hair. Both septum piercing and wooden lobe plugs were customary.

Death rites among the Kaurareg were apparently the same as those prevailing among the Mua and other Islanders. Once the deceased's mari (spirit) left the body, the latter was laid on a sara (mortuary bier raised on four legs) and left until decomposition stripped the flesh from the bones, and the latter were rubbed with red, gathered within a bark sheath and buried in a sand mound surrounded by shells, skulls and dugong bones.

== Notable people ==
- Patty Mills, NBA basketball player

== See also ==
- Australian frontier wars

== Sources ==
- Bowen, James; Bowen, Margarita (2002). The Great Barrier Reef. Cambridge University Press. ISBN 978-1-139-44064-6.
- Carroll, J.M., ed. (1969). "Journey Into Torres Straits" (PDF). Queensland Heritage. 2 (1): 35–42.
- Clarke, Allan (24 November 2012). "Kaurareg". Living Black. SBS Television – via YouTube.
- "Customary law and lore of the coast". Coastal and Marine Studies in Australia – Module 14. Marine Education Society of Australasia.
- Dixon, Robert M. W. (2002). Australian Languages: Their Nature and Development. Vol. 1. Cambridge University Press. ISBN 978-0-521-47378-1.
- Dousset, Laurent (2005). "Kaurareg". AusAnthrop Australian Aboriginal tribal database.
- Greer, Shelley; McIntyre-Tamwoy, Susan; Henry, Rosita (2011). Sentinel Sites in a cosmo-political seascape (PDF). 7th International Small Islands Conference, Airlie Beach, Whitsundays. pp. 2–10. Archived from the original (PDF) on 31 October 2016.
- Haddon, A. C. (2011). General Ethnography. Reports of the Cambridge Anthropological Expedition to Torres Straits. Vol. 1. Cambridge University Press. ISBN 978-0-521-17986-7.
- "Hammond". Queensland Government. 26 November 2014.
- "Kaurareg People Declare Independence from Australia". Cultural Survival. 2002.
- The Kaurareg People's native title determinations: Questions and answers (PDF). National Native Title Tribunal. 2001. p. 1. ISBN 0-642-26208-X. Archived from the original on 12 September 2007.
- Kaurareg Report (PDF) (Report). Healing Foundation. November 2012.
- Lahn, Julie (2003). Past Visions, Present Lives: and sociality and locaslity in a Torres Strait community (PDF). James Cook University. Archived from the original (PDF) on 31 October 2016.
- "Language information: Kala Lagaw Ya". Australian Indigenous Languages Database. AIATSIS. 26 June 2012.
- Lawrence, David; Lawrence, Helen Reeves (2004). "Torres Strait: the region and its people". In Davis, Richard (ed.). Woven Histories, Dancing Lives: Torres Strait Islander Identity, Culture and History. Aboriginal Studies Press. pp. 15–29. ISBN 978-0-855-75432-7.
- Memmott, Paul (2007). Gunyah, Goondie + Wurley: The Aboriginal Architecture of Australia. University of Queensland Press. ISBN 978-0-702-23245-9.
- Moore, David R. (1979). Islanders and Aborigines at Cape York. Australian Institute of Aboriginal Studies. ISBN 978-0-855-75082-4.
- Mullins, Steve (1995). Torres Strait: A History of Colonial Occupation and Culture Contact 1864-1897. Central Queensland University Press. ISBN 978-0-908-14095-4.
- Osborne, Elizabeth (2009). Throwing Off the Cloak: Reclaiming Self-reliance in Torres Strait. Aboriginal Studies Press. ISBN 978-0-855-75662-8.
- Ōshima, Jōji [in Japanese] (1983). Ōshima, Jōji (ed.). Torres kaikyo no hitobito トレス海峡の人々―その地理学的・民族学的研究. 古今書院. ISBN 978-4-772-21191-8.
- "Separatist moves in Torres Strait". Australian Broadcasting Corporation. 26 March 2012.
- Sharp, Nonie (1992). Footprints Along the Cape York Sandbeaches. Aboriginal Studies Press. ISBN 978-0-855-75230-9.
- Shnukal, Anna (2001). "Torres Strait Islanders" (PDF). In Brandle, Maximilian (ed.). Multicultural Queensland 2001. Department of Premier and Cabinet, State of Queensland. pp. 21–35. ISBN 978-1-743-32389-2.
- Shnukal, Anna (2008). "Traditional Mua" (PDF). Memoirs of the Queensland Museum. Cultural Heritage Series. 4 (2): 7–33.
- Southon, Michael; Elders, Kaurareg Tribal (2014) [First published 1998]. "The Sea of Waubin: The Kaurareg and their marine environment". In Peterson, Nicolas; Rigsby, Bruce (eds.). Customary marine tenure in Australia. Sydney University Press. pp. 351–367. ISBN 978-1-743-32389-2.
- "Thursday Island (Waiben)". Queensland Government. 26 November 2014. Archived from the original on 21 January 2020.
- "Thursday Island (Waiben)". Government of Queensland. 20 April 2018. Text has been copied from this source, which is available under a Attribution 4.0 International (CC BY 4.0) licence.
- Wallace, Lennie (2011). Cape York Peninsula. Boolarong Press. pp. 4–7. ISBN 978-1-921-92067-7.
