= Ankamuti =

Indigenous Australian people

The Ankamuti, also spelt Ankamuthi, are an Aboriginal Australian people of the Cape York Peninsula of Queensland.

== Language ==
The Ankamuti spoke one of the Uradhi dialects.

== Country ==
Ankamuti territory, according to Norman Tindale, extended over some 700 square miles (1,800 km^{2}) around the western side of Cape York, as far south as Vrilya Point. Its inland extension was close to the headwaters of the Jardine River. Offshore, they were also on Possession Island and Crab Island (Queensland) and the western islands of Endeavour Strait.

== Alternative names ==
- Goomkoding
- Yumakundji (perhaps a Yadhaykenu exonym)
- Amkomti
- Ondaima (? perhaps referring to a horde)
- Oiyamkwi (people on Red Island)
- Apukwi (people of Crab Island)
- Ankamuthi

== Sources ==
- Creed (1878). Ridley, William (ed.). "Australian Languages and Traditions". Royal Anthropological Institute of Great Britain and Ireland. 7: 266–268. doi:10.2307/2841001. JSTOR 2841001.
- Crowley, Terry (1983). "Uradhi". In Dixon, Robert M. W.; Blake, Barry J. (eds.). Handbook of Australian languages. Vol. 3. Australian National University Press. pp. 306–428. ISBN 978-9-027-22005-9.
- Jardine, Francis Lascelles; Jardin, Alexander William (1867). Byerley, Frederick J. (ed.). Narrative of the Overland Expedition of the Messrs. Jardine, from Rockhamptom to Cape York, Northern Queensland. Brisbane: J. W. Buxton.
- McGillivray, John (1852). Narrative of the voyage of H.M.S. Rattlesnake, commanded by the late Captain Owen Stanley during the years 1846-50, including discoveries and surveys in New Guinea, the Louisiade Archipelago, etc: to which is added Mr. E.B. Kennedy's expedition for the exploration of the Cape York Peninsula (PDF). London: T. & W. Boone.
- Tindale, Norman Barnett (1974). "Ankamuti (QLD)". Aboriginal Tribes of Australia: Their Terrain, Environmental Controls, Distribution, Limits, and Proper Names. Australian National University Press. ISBN 978-0-708-10741-6.
