= Somerset, Queensland =

Somerset
- Suburb
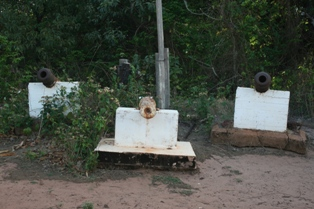
- The old cannons at Somerset

- Interactive map of Somerset
- Coordinates: 10.8202°S 142.5175°E
- Country: Australia
- State: Queensland
- LGAs: Shire of Torres; Northern Peninsula Area Region
- Location: 9.6 km (6.0 mi) SE of Bamaga; 467 km (290 mi) NNE of Weipa; 826 km (513 mi) NNW of Cooktown; 995 km (618 mi) NNW of Cairns; 2,776 km (1,725 mi) NNW of Brisbane

Government
  - State electorate: Cook
  - Federal division: Leichhardt

Area
  - Total: 463.5 km^{2} (179.0 sq mi)

Population
  - Total: 0 (2021 census)
  - Density: 0.0000/km^{2} (0.0000/sq mi)
- Postcode: 4876
Suburbs around Somerset
Punsand; New Mapoon	Torres Strait	Coral Sea
Bamaga	Somerset	Coral Sea
Umagico	Jardine	Jardine

Somerset is a coastal locality split between the Shire of Torres and the Northern Peninsula Area Region, Queensland, Australia. In the 2021 census, Somerset had "no people or a very low population".

== Geography ==
Somerset is the northernmost locality on the Cape York Peninsula and also of the Queensland mainland with Cape York at the northernmost point. It is not the northernmost locality in Queensland, as there are numerous island localities to the north in the Torres Strait.

The Great Dividing Range commences just south of Cape York and extends through to Victoria.

The Northern Peninsula Airport is in the south of the locality (10.9447°S 142.4530°E). It is operated by the Northern Peninsula Area Regional Council. It is 10.1 kilometres (6.3 mi) south-east of the town of Bamaga to the west of the locality of Somerset.

There are relatively few roads in the locality:

- Pajinka Road connects Cape York to the town of Bamaga to the west of the locality
- Somerset Road connects from Pajinka Road to the historic Somerset settlement and Fly Point
- Narau Beach Road connects from Somerset Road to Narau Beach
- Airport Road connects the town of Bamaga with the Northern Peninsula Airport

There is minimal land use within the locality.

=== Coastal features ===
The locality has many coastal features, some on the mainland and others on the islands. The northern coast of the locality is comprised on headlands and beaches, while the southern coast is marshland without many features.

On the mainland (clockwise from north):

- Punsand Bay (10.7115°S 142.4760°E)
- Bay Point (10.6994°S 142.5146°E)
- York Island (10.6835°S 142.5291°E)
- Cape York (10.6876°S 142.5315°E)
- Eborac Island (10.6823°S 142.5341°E)
- Evans Point (10.6968°S 142.5412°E)
- Evans Bay (10.7061°S 142.5433°E)
- Ida Point (10.7088°S 142.5528°E)
- Ida Island (10.7096°S 142.5579°E)
- Muddy Bay (10.725°S 142.56°E)
- Bishop Point (10.7228°S 142.5669°E)
- Shallow Bay (10.7296°S 142.5722°E)
- Osnaburg Point (10.7260°S 142.5824°E)
- Stover Bay (10.7316°S 142.5852°E)
- Somerset Bay (10.7408°S 142.5944°E)
- Sheridan Point (10.7473°S 142.6056°E)
- Fly Point (10.7502°S 142.6096°E)
- Putta Putta Beach (10.7547°S 142.6021°E)
- Freshwater Beach (10.7605°S 142.5976°E)
- Freshwater Bay (10.7615°S 142.5997°E)
- Vallack Point (10.7650°S 142.5994°E)
- Nanthau Beach (10.7759°S 142.5872°E)
- Narau Beach (10.7893°S 142.5799°E)
- Chandogoo Point (10.7956°S 142.5789°E)
- Saldogoo Beach (10.8073°S 142.5639°E)
- Cliffy Point (10.8222°S 142.5587°E)
- Kilbie Beach (10.8256°S 142.5546°E)
- Newcastle Bay (10.833°S 142.600°E)
- Congora Beach (10.8380°S 142.5441°E)
- Kennedy Inlet (10.8827°S 142.5330°E)

Albany Passage (10.7391°S 142.6°E) separates the mainland from Albany Island (10.7298°S 142.6053°E). The island has the following coastal features (clockwise from north):

- Frederick Point (10.7156°S 142.5861°E)
- Tree Island (10.7043°S 142.5970°E)
- Bush Islet (10.7088°S 142.5978°E)
- Arethusa Point (10.7141°S 142.5966°E)
- Pioneer Bay (10.7215°S 142.6066°E)
- Alfred Point (10.7223°S 142.6158°E)
- Mai Islet (10.7215°S 142.6248°E)
- Charlotte Point (10.7322°S 142.6205°E)
- Vicary Bay (10.7380°S 142.6191°E)
- Ulrica Point (10.7466°S 142.6235°E)
- Lyons Point (10.7450°S 142.6123°E)

Although not within the locality, the Adolphus Channel separates the mainland from Mount Adolphus Island, also known as Mori (10.6368°S 142.6516°E).

=== Mountains ===
Somerset has the following mountains:

- Mount Bremer near the northern tip of the mainland (10.6993°S 142.5345°E) 115 metres (377 ft)
- Mount Roma in the north-west of the locality (10.7338°S 142.5194°E) 100 metres (330 ft)

== History ==
Several Indigenous groups occupied this region prior to European contact. In an 1896 report to the Queensland Government, Archibald Meston estimated that in the 1870s the Indigenous population between Newcastle Bay (10.8857°S 142.6014°E) and Cape York was around 3000. At the time of writing his report, he believed that the population had fallen to around 300. This rapid decline was caused by a number of factors, including introduced disease, exclusions from traditional hunting grounds and frontier violence. Reverend Frederick Charles Jagg, a missionary at Somerset appointed by the Society for the Propagation of the Gospel, gave an indication of the relationship between European and Indigenous peoples when he reported in 1867 that "The aborigines have been described as the most degraded, treacherous and bloodthirsty beings in existence by the present Police Magistrate, and those whose only idea is to shoot them down whenever they were seen".

Gudang (Gootung) is one of the languages of the tip of Cape York. The Gudang language region includes the landscape within the local government boundaries of the Northern Peninsula Area Regional Council, particularly the localities of Somerset, Albany Passage and Newcastle Bay extending north to the Tip.

With its separation from New South Wales on 10 December 1859, the new colony of Queensland acquired over 5,000 kilometres (3,100 mi) of coastline extending as far north as Cape York Peninsula. The colony's first parliament passed a resolution in 1860 favouring direct connection with England via the Torres Strait. In December 1861, Sir George Ferguson Bowen (1821–99), Governor of Queensland (1859–67), described the necessity for a station in the far north of Queensland. From a naval and military point of view, a post at or near Cape York would be valuable, due to the establishment of a French colony and naval station in New Caledonia. Bowen informed Henry Pelham-Clinton, 5th Duke of Newcastle, Secretary of State for the Colonies, that the government of Queensland would be willing to undertake the formation and management of a station at Cape York and to support a civil establishment there.

On 27 August 1862, Bowen left Brisbane on HMS Pioneer to select an eligible site for the proposed settlement. The chosen site, opposite Albany Island, was named Somerset, in honour of the First Lord of the Admiralty, Edward Seymour, 12th Duke of Somerset.

Tenders were called for the construction of government buildings in March 1863, a town survey was undertaken in July 1864 and the Town Reserve of Somerset was established on 8 July 1864. The first Somerset land sale was held in Brisbane on 4 April 1865 and a second sale took place on 2 May 1866. Land parcels sold at these auctions were about one acre (0.405 a) in size.

In February 1864, John Jardine (1807–74) was appointed Somerset's first Police Magistrate and Commissioner of Crown Lands and in July 1864 he was appointed District Registrar for the District of North Cook. An early sketch of Somerset by Jardine shows the Government Residence, Police Magistrate's House and Customs House on the southern side of Somerset Bay, and Marines' Barracks and the Medical Superintendent's House on the northern side. Henry Simpson succeeded Jardine as Police Magistrate in 1866. The Marines were withdrawn in 1867 and replaced with Native Police.

John Jardine was the father of Francis (Frank) Lascelles Jardine (1841–1919) and Alexander (Alick) William Jardine (1843–1920) who, between May 1864 and March 1865, undertook an overland expedition from Rockhampton to Cape York which was described at the time as, geographically:

"solving the question of the course of the northern rivers emptying into the Gulf of Carpentaria of which nothing was known but their outlets. It has also made known...how much ... or rather, how little, of the 'York Peninsula' is adapted for pastoral occupation, whilst its success in taking the first stock overland, and forming a cattle station at Newcastle Bay, has ensured to the Settlement at Somerset a necessary and welcome supply of fresh meat...".

The Jardine River was named after them by order of Governor Bowen. For their pioneering exploratory efforts the Jardine brothers were made Fellows of the Royal Geographical Society and awarded the Society's Murchison Award in 1886.

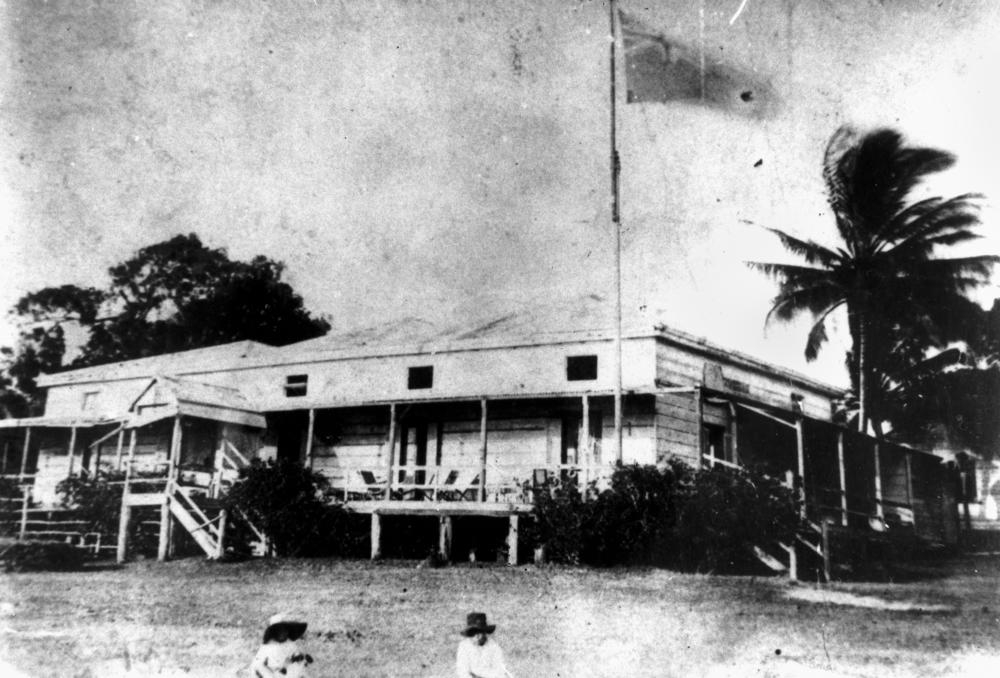
Frank Jardine's home, the former Government Resident's House at Somerset, Cape York Peninsula

Frank Jardine was appointed as a Magistrate in December 1867 and as Police Magistrate and Inspector of Police at Somerset in April 1868. In 1869 he held the positions of District Registrar for Somerset, Police Magistrate, Clerk of Petty Sessions, Inspector of Police and Postmaster. He married Samoan woman, Sana Sofala, in 1873 and the couple had four children: Alice Maule Lascelles, Hew Cholmondeley (Chum), Bootle Arthur Lascelles (Bertie) and Elizabeth Sana Hamilton. Frank Jardine's tenure as a government officer in Somerset was not without controversy. The local Indigenous population was dispossessed and there was hostility between them and the Jardine family, both during Frank and Alick Jardine's expedition to Somerset, and during the years of the settlement. Jardine was also suspended for a time from his duties as Police Magistrate whilst being investigated in relation to using his position to obtain a pearl diving licence.

Somerset became redundant as a port once a safer shipping route to the Torres Strait was found and a settlement on Thursday Island was built from 1876. Frank Jardine continued to live at Somerset, maintaining the police residence until his death there in March 1919. During this time, Jardine continued to maintain a beef cattle herd; was engaged in the pearling industry; and created a coconut/copra plantation at Somerset. Due to Somerset's isolated location the Jardine family provided assistance and hospitality to travellers and seafarers, for example, Jardine aided the survivors of the shipwreck of RMS Quetta in 1890.

The pearl diving industry was important to the Queensland economy, and came to be dominated by Japanese divers after 1891. Kobori Itchimatsu came from the village of Nishi Mukai in Wakayama prefecture, an area that provided 80 per cent of the 7,000 Japanese who left their country to become pearl divers.

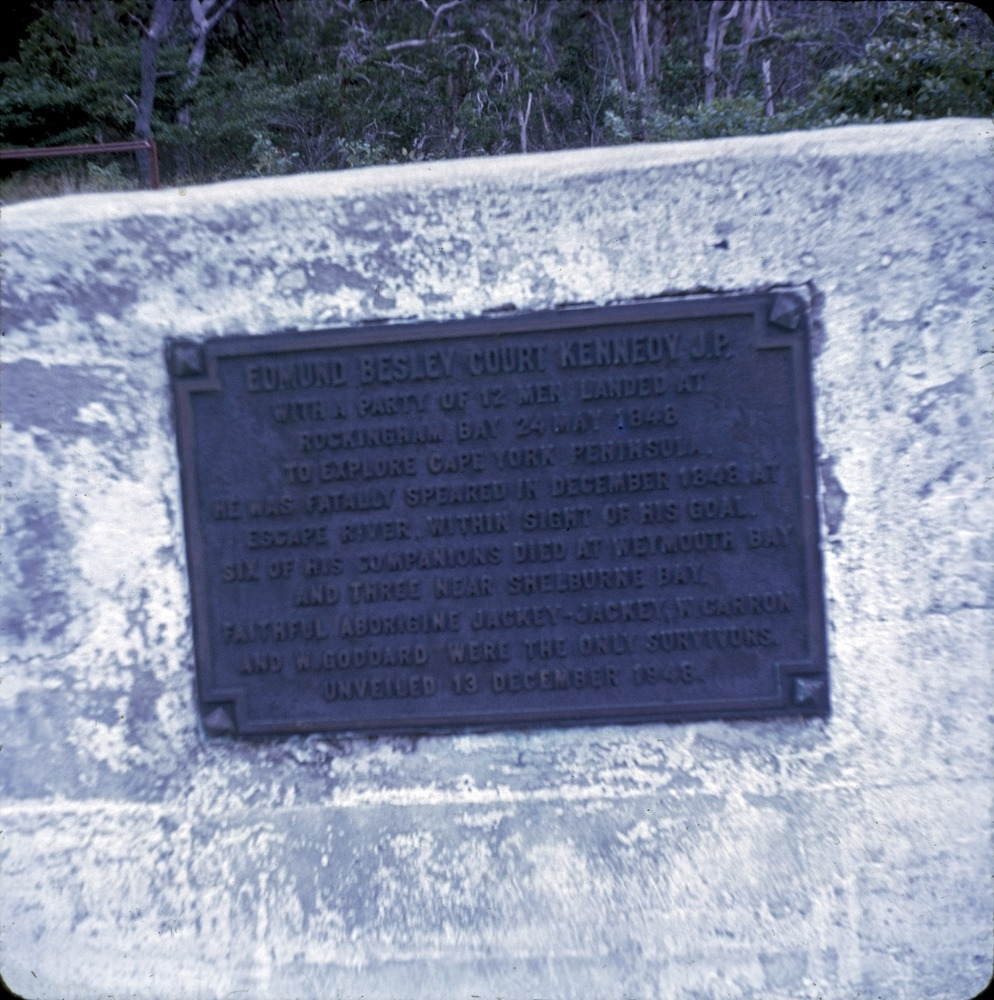
Kennedy Memorial Monument, circa 1969

The Kennedy Memorial Monument was unveiled on 13 December 1948 in commemoration of the 100th anniversary of Edmund Besley Court Kennedy's unsuccessful exploration of Cape York Peninsula. The monument comprises a concrete slab on a concrete footing with a bronze commemorative plaque on its eastern face.

In 2011 the Angkamuthi Seven Rivers, the McDonnell Atampaya and the Gudang/Yadhaigana groups made an application for native title determination over the Northern Peninsula Area Regional Council and Cook Shire areas, covering an area of approximately 685,642 hectares (1,694,260 acres). The determination was handed down on 30 October 2014.

== Demographics ==
In the 2011 census, Somerset had "no people or a very low population".

In the 2016 census, Somerset had "no people or a very low population".

In the 2021 census, Somerset had "no people or a very low population".

== Education ==
There are no schools in Somerset. The nearest government primary and secondary school is the Northern Peninsula Area College in neighbouring Bamaga to the west.

== Attractions ==
There is an historical ruin of Somerset homestead, a station established by John Jardine (father of Frank Jardine) in 1863 and is 35 km north of Bamaga on Cape York in Queensland, Australia. It is a good camping area and day trip with facilities for barbecues. It is situated near a beach.

== See also ==
- Constance Drinkwater and the final days of Somerset
- Too Many Spears

== Heritage listings ==
- Somerset Graves Site (10.7409°S 142.5925°E)

== Sources ==
- Somerset. Pictures, photos, objects
- Narrative of the overland expedition of the Messrs. Jardine, from Rockhampton to Cape York, Northern Queensland. Frank and Alexander Jardine Compiled from the journals of the brothers, and edited by Frederick J. Byerley, (Engineer of Roads, Northern Division of Queensland). — Brisbane: J. W. Buxton, 1867. — p. 88
- Austin C. G., Early history of Somerset and Thursday Island, Journal of the Royal Historical Society of Queensland, vol. 4, № 2, 1949, p. 216-230, ISSN 1837-8366
- Bayton J., The mission to the Aborigines at Somerset, Journal of the Royal Historical Society of Queensland, vol. 7, № 3, 1965, p. 622-633, ISSN 0085-5804
- Carroll J. M., Journey into Torres Straits, Queensland Heritage, vol. 2, № 1, 1969, p. 35-42, ISSN 0033-6157
- Moore, C. R., Queensland's annexation of New Guinea in 1883, Journal of the Royal Historical Society of Queensland, vol. 12, № 1, 1984, p. 26-54, ISSN 0085-5804
- Australian Dictionary of Biography: Jardine, John (1807-1874)
- Australian Dictionary of Biography: Jardine, Francis Lascelles (Frank) (1841–1919)
- Australian Dictionary of Biography: Chester, Henry Marjoribanks (1832–1914)
- Australian Dictionary of Biography: Dalrymple, George Augustus (1826–1876)
