= Yatay =

Yatay may be,

- Butia yatay, the yatay palm
- Yatay language
- Battle of Yatay
