= Injinoo =

Aboriginal Australian people

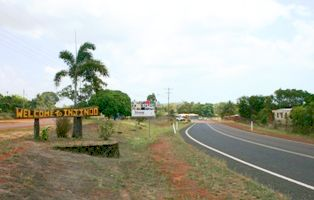
Injinoo

The Injinoo were an Indigenous Australian people of the Cape York Peninsula, and their name now applies to a tribal aggregation of remnants of various tribes of the Cape York Peninsula.

== Country ==
The traditional lands of the Injinoo Community extend from the Skardon River on the west coast, and Captain Billy's Landing on the east coast up to Pajinka at the top of Cape York.

== History of contact ==
The Injinoo are of mixed descent, constituted by peoples who, displaced by settler expansionism, were driven to this area where they intermarried with the Injinoo, and developed a collective Injinoo identity. In the early decades of the 20th century, several aboriginal communities settled on Injinoo land; these are now grouped as the Red Island and Seven Rivers tribes and the MacDonald River people. The Red Island east coasters comprise descendants of the Gudang and Yadhaigana and a sprinkling of Wuthathi. Together with the Seven Rivers remnant they established a community on Small River (Injinoo-Cowal Creek). The MacDonald River people are Gumathi. They form a Deed of Grant in Trust community.

There are five communities which lie on the traditional country of the Injinoo peoples in the Northern Peninsula Area Region of Cape York Peninsula: Bamaga, Seisia, Injinoo, Umagico and New Mapoon.

== Notes and references ==
=== References ===
- Sharp, Nonie (1992). Footprints Along the Cape York Sandbeaches. Aboriginal Studies Press. ISBN 978-0-855-75230-9.
