= YTY =

YTY or yty may refer to:

- YTY, the IATA code for Yangzhou Taizhou International Airport, Jiangsu Province, China
- yty, the ISO 639-3 code for Yatay language, Queensland, Australia
