= Djagaraga =

Australian Aboriginal tribe

Albany Island
Native name: Pabaju
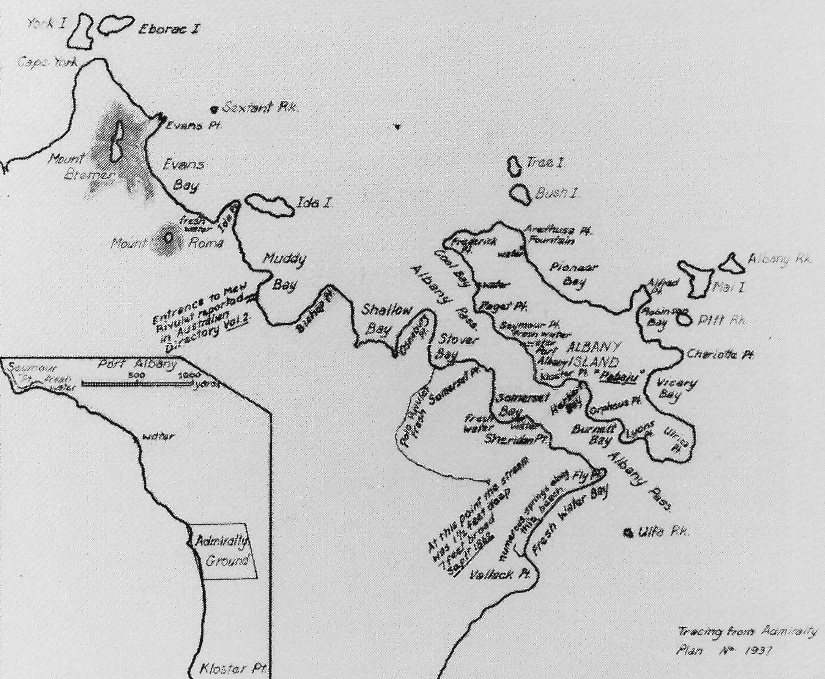
- Admiralty Plan No. 1937. Plan drawn in 1862 showing site on Albany Island advised for the proposed Cape York Station, and the best position for the township on the mainland opposite.

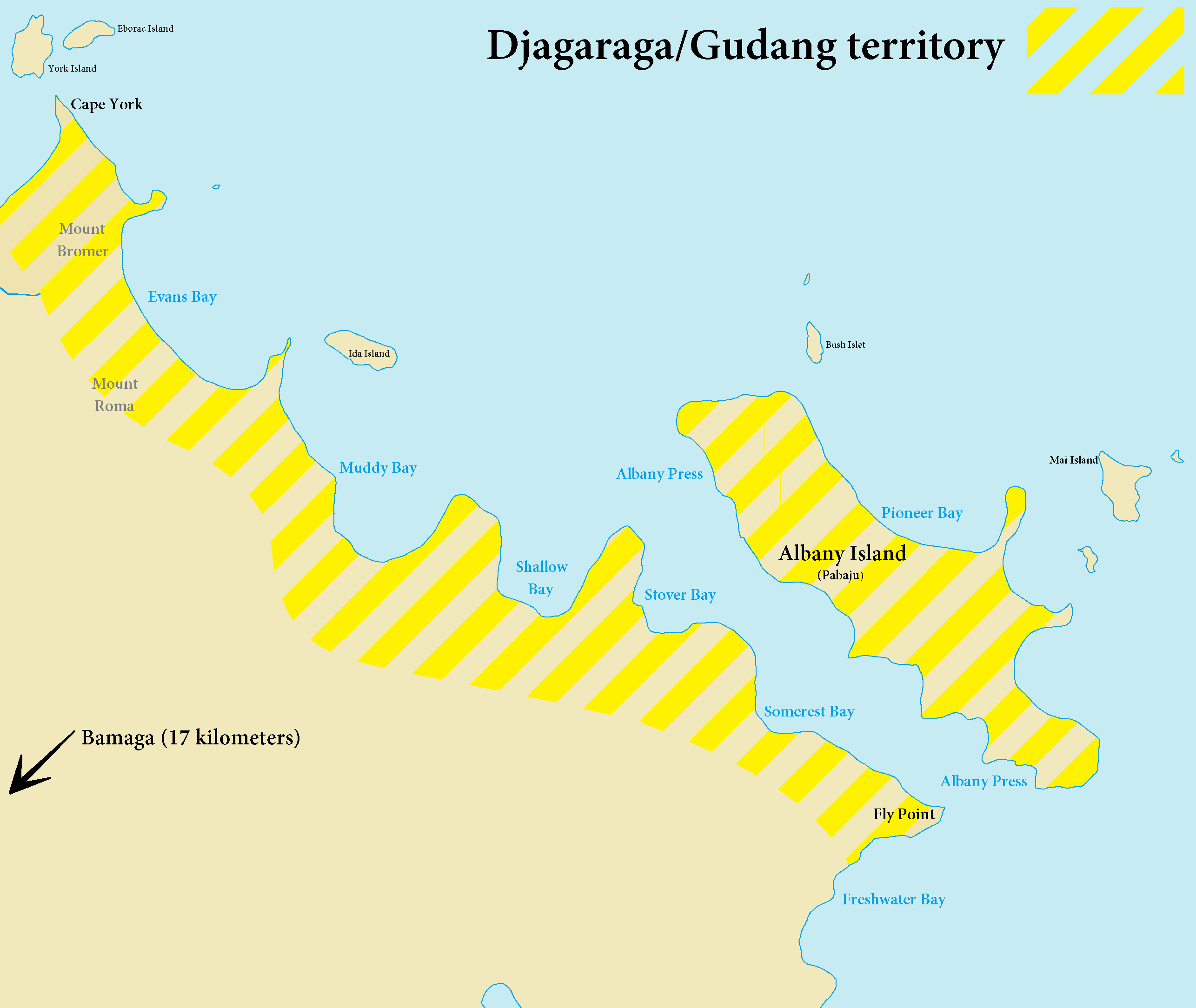
Djagaraga-Gudang territory in Cape York, Queensland, Australia

The Djagaraga or Gudang (Pantyinamu/Yatay/Gudang/Kartalaiga and other clans) are an Australian Aboriginal tribe, who traditionally lived in the coastal area from Cape York to Fly point, including also Pabaju (Albany Island), in the Cape York Peninsula, Queensland. In the early period of white settlement as the Somerset tribe, after the settlement of Somerset established on their lands in 1863.

The names Yatay, Gudang and Kartalaiga appear to be exonyms from Kalau Lagau Ya (the Western and Central Torres Strait Islanders), respectively yadai "words", gudalnga ("mouthy") and katalaiga "green frog person"; the totem of the Kartalaiga was the green frog.

== Language ==
They spoke Gudang language, alt. Djagaraga, which according to Kenneth L. Hale's classification, was one of 10 languages of a northern Paman subgroup.

== Social organization ==
The Djagaraga were divided up into hordes, of which four, according to Tindale, are thought to be registered, though some of these are now counted as distinct tribes.

- Gudang/Alauian (Cape York)
- Unduamo
- Kekosino (Escape River)
- Kokiliga (?)

== Social culture ==
Nonie Smith states that their 'relations with the Western Torres Strait Island people the Kaurareg were 'so close that despite their distinct identity they could be regarded almost as an outpost of the latter.' They also shared trade, kin and ritual links with their eastern coastal tribal neighbour, the Unduyamo Some recent scholarship, basing its inferences on the density of ceremonial rock structures throughout the territory of the Gudang and Unduyamo, speculates that they may have functioned as ceremonial masters for rites of initiation and the magical increase of natural species also for the Torres Strait peoples with whom they had close relations of trade, marriage and religion.

== History ==
According to Dr. Creed, large numbers of the Djagaraga were killed off by the Yadhaykenu within living memory. (Note: 'The natives at Cape York call themselves Gudaŋ. Westward of that tribe are the Kokiliga; south-west of the Gudaŋ are the Ondaima; and due south, are the Yaldaigan, who have almost exterminated the Gudaŋ.')

== Sources ==
- Creed (1878). Ridley, William (ed.). "Australian Languages and Traditions". The Journal of the Anthropological Institute of Great Britain and Ireland. 7: 266–268. doi:10.2307/2841001. JSTOR 2841001.
- Dixon, Robert M. W. (2002). Australian Languages: Their Nature and Development. Vol. 1. Cambridge University Press. ISBN 978-0-521-47378-1.
- Greer, Shelley; McIntyre-Tamwoy, Susan; Henry, Rosita (2011). Sentinel Sites in a cosmo-political seascape (PDF). 7th International Small Islands Conference, Airlie Beach, Whitsundays. pp. 2–10. Archived from the original (PDF) on 31 October 2016.
- Jardine, Francis Lascelles; Jardin, Alexander William (1867). Byerley, Frederick J. (ed.). Narrative of the Overland Expedition of the Messrs. Jardine, from Rockhamptom to Cape York, Northern Queensland. Brisbane: J. W. Buxton.
- McGillivray, John (1852). Narrative of the voyage of H.M.S. Rattlesnake, commanded by the late Captain Owen Stanley during the years 1846-50, including discoveries and surveys in New Guinea, the Louisiade Archipelago, etc: to which is added Mr. E.B. Kennedy's expedition for the exploration of the Cape York Peninsula (PDF). London: T. & W. Boone.
- Moore, David R. (1979). Islanders and Aborigines at Cape York. Australian Institute of Aboriginal Studies. ISBN 978-0-855-75082-4.
- Sharp, Nonie (1992). Footprints Along the Cape York Sandbeaches. Aboriginal Studies Press. ISBN 978-0-855-75230-9.
- Tindale, Norman Barnett (1974). "Ankamuti (QLD)". Aboriginal Tribes of Australia: Their Terrain, Environmental Controls, Distribution, Limits, and Proper Names. Australian National University Press. ISBN 978-0-708-10741-6.
