= Francis Lascelles Jardine =

Scottish-Australian pioneer

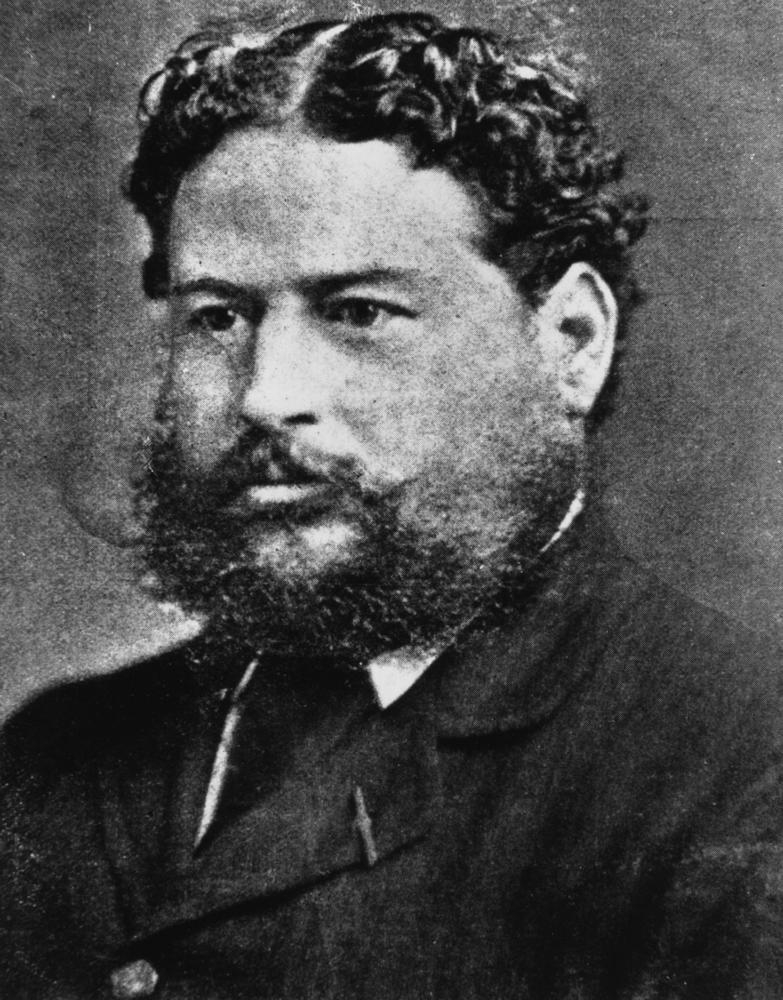
Frank Jardine, 1880s

Francis Lascelles (Frank) Jardine (28 August 1841 – 19 March 1919) was a Scottish-Australian pioneer who was at the forefront of European exploration of Australia in the Cape York Peninsula and Torres Strait regions of Far North Queensland.

== Early life ==
Frank Jardine was born on 28 August 1841 at the "Rathluba" property near East Maitland in the British colony of New South Wales. His father, John Jardine, was a Scottish military officer who came to Australia with his wife in 1840 to take up the offer of a land grant and become a grazier. The Jardines sold "Rathluba" in 1842 and after a brief period living near Cecil Park, moved to the Wellington district in the central-west of the colony. Frank's father became a well-known pastoral squatter, Commissioner of Crown Lands and police magistrate in this region, obtaining and selling various properties including "Gobolion" and "The Holmes". With this new found prosperity, Frank, along with his younger brothers were sent to Sydney for schooling to be educated at Sydney Grammar School.

== Rockhampton ==
In 1858, Frank's father accepted a position of Commissioner of Crown Lands in the frontier Port Curtis District and in 1861 he also became the police magistrate at Rockhampton. After completing his schooling in Sydney, Frank joined his parents and siblings at Rockhampton and by 1862 was involved in the business of land sales and subdivision in that town.

== Journey to Cape York ==
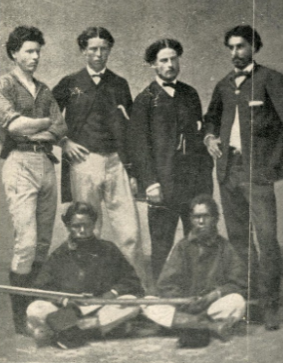
Frank Jardine (standing third from left) with his brothers and Native Police troopers

In 1864 Jardine's father, John Jardine, was again appointed by the Government of Queensland as a magistrate in another frontier region of British colonisation. This time he was to establish and supervise a British outpost at the very tip of the Cape York Peninsula. With the aid of a contingent of Royal Marines, he sailed there in August 1864 and constructed a small settlement which was called Somerset. It was decided that Frank Jardine along with his younger brother Alexander William Jardine would travel overland from Rockhampton with herds of livestock to Somerset in order to set up a cattle station to support the new outpost.

Frank Jardine and his brother initially began this droving journey from Rockhampton in May 1864 in two separate groups which eventually rendezvoused at John Graham MacDonald's Carpentaria Downs station on the Einasleigh River. From here the remaining 1000 km was through a region unoccupied by the British. On 11 October 1864 the combined party led by Frank Jardine started out from Carpentaria Downs. It consisted of Frank, his brother Alex, three stockmen, a surveyor, four Native Police troopers, 42 horses and 250 head of cattle.

The trip took another five months, during which time the party was constantly opposed by the area's Indigenous inhabitants as they forced their way through scrub and swamps and crossed at least six large rivers, including the Jardine River which was subsequently named after the brothers. They reached Somerset on 2 March 1865 with 12 horses and 50 cattle. Jardine's men survived, in poor health; they left a trail of dead Aborigines, dead horses and cattle and all their equipment. Jardine claimed to have personally killed 47 people, with a total death toll for the trip of over 200. Both Jardine brothers were elected Fellows of the Royal Geographical Society and received the Murchison Award.

== Point Vallack cattle station ==
On arrival at Somerset, Frank Jardine and his group started construction of the cattle station. They chose an area about 2 km south of the settlement at Point Vallack for the main camp and they also set up an outpost camp named Lockerbie which was 15 km west of Somerset. Frank sailed for Brisbane in late 1865 as did his father who resigned from Somerset to return to Rockhampton. Frank, however, maintained ownership of the Point Vallack and Lockerbie cattle stations and returned to the area in early 1866.

He soon discovered that the local resident Aboriginal population resented the loss of their lands to his cattle stations and on a number of occasions in 1866 they attempted to burn down the structures and also speared dozens of livestock. The new police magistrate at Somerset noted that Jardine's method of dealing with Aboriginal resistance was to go out and shoot them. In 1867, Jardine led a punitive expedition to Turtle Island where ten people were shot dead. There is also a local oral tradition that Jardine with his stockmen and native troopers shot down another large group of people around this time near to where the modern town of Bamaga now stands.

== Police magistrate at Somerset ==
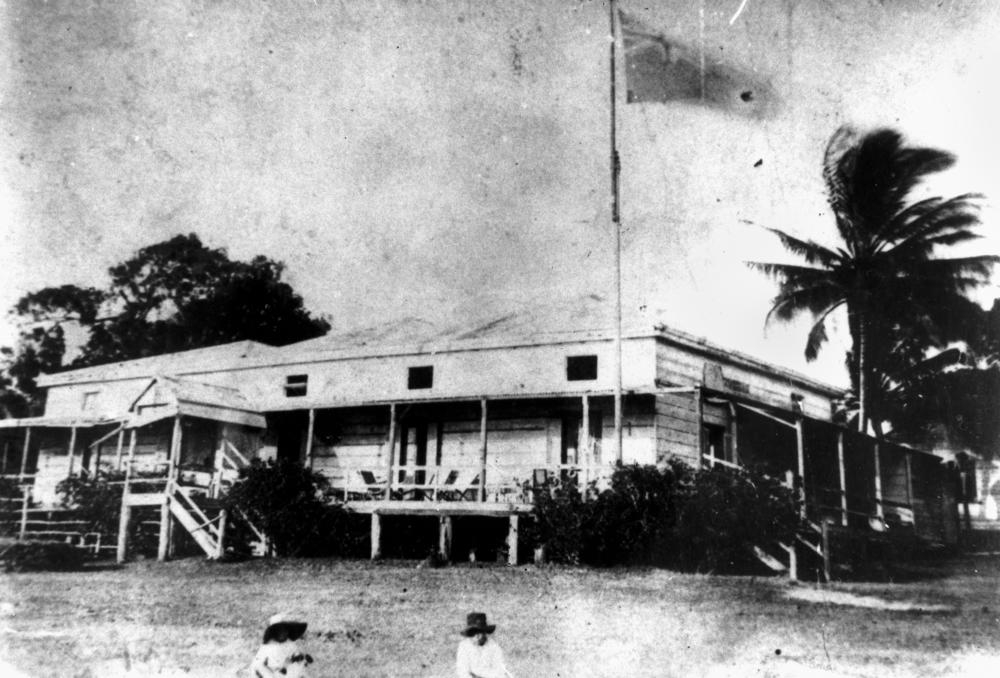
The Jardine residence, former Government House at Somerset, Cape York, Queensland

In December 1867 Frank Jardine while still in charge of his cattle operations, was also appointed by the Queensland Government as police magistrate at Somerset. This appointment gave Jardine immense power over the Cape York region as he now was the government representative, had personal ownership of much of the land, controlled the seven police constables stationed at Somerset and also still commanded the four native troopers who had accompanied him on his overlanding journey in 1864.

In May 1868, the local Aboriginal people organised a large assault on Jardine's Point Vallack cattle station which resulted in the death of one of his native troopers named Eulah, and the looting of a significant amount of supplies and firearms. In one account, Jardine is said to have organised a substantial retribution where 32 local people were killed. In the months after this incident Jardine received an extra five Native Police troopers and also decided to sell the troubled Point Vallack cattle station to the government.

In June 1869, Jardine discovered that the captain and crew of a pearl-trading cutter named the Sperwer had been killed and their boat burnt by the Kaurareg people living on Muralag Island in the Torres Strait. Over the next 12 months Frank Jardine and Henry Chester (who was a temporary replacement magistrate at Somerset) conducted at least two large punitive expeditions on Muralag Island. In July 1869, Jardine led his native troopers and armed crewmen from the blackbirding vessel Melanie in a dawn raid on a village on the island killing many people. As Jardine believed that the Kaurareg were keeping the wife of the captain of the Sperwer captive somewhere, follow up punishments were organised. In April 1870, Chester led an armed group of 45 police and assistants in another raid on a Muralag village. The village was burnt and 20 men were taken prisoner, three of whom were summarily executed on the beach next to the village. It was later discovered the captain's wife was actually living in Melbourne.

Six of Jardine's native troopers deserted in February 1871 taking with them a substantial amount of stores and firearms. Jardine had them hunted down with four shot dead and the remaining two taken prisoner.

In October 1871, Jardine reported the arrival of missionaries from the London Missionary Society who used Somerset as a base to introduce Christianity over the Torres Strait Islanders, a process that came to be known as "The Coming of the Light".

== Mother-of-pearl merchant ==
From 1872 Jardine became highly involved in the profitable mother-of-pearl trade in the Torres Strait. He utilised the police constables and Native Police troopers under his command to take divers in government and private boats to collect the pearl shell. It would then be sold and shipped to Sydney for his personal profit. He placed one of his younger brothers, Charles Jardine, as the official owner of the pearling licence to avoid scrutiny of his activities. However, the Brisbane press soon revealed these alleged corrupt practices of misuse of his government position for personal gain. The scandal resulted in Frank Jardine's dismissal from his police magistrate position at Somerset in 1873. Several inquiries followed but Jardine did not have to face any charges largely due to witnesses being unwilling to give testimony and the Premier of Queensland, Arthur Hunter Palmer, being a personal friend and probable business partner of his. Jardine, although removed from government employment, was able to continue his pearling operations in the Torres Strait and quickly expanded his investment in the industry by establishing a large pearling station at Nagi Island. One of Jardine's last actions as police magistrate of Somerset was to lead another punitive mission against a group of Aboriginal people living about 50 km from Somerset who had killed a skipper of one of his pearl-boats. With the assistance of his Native Police troopers, a "large-scale slaughter" ensued.

At the time of his dismissal, Jardine was in a relationship with a fifteen year old Samoan girl named Sana Solia who had been brought to the Torres Strait by the missionary George Turner. They married in late 1873 and lived together on Nagi Island (also known as Naghir or Mount Ernest Island) where Jardine continued his pearl shell business and built a family home. In 1877 this house burnt down with much of the Jardines' personal possessions. Fortunately for them, the government in that same year had decided to move its base of Torres Strait operations from Somerset to Thursday Island and approached Frank Jardine with the offer to purchase the old site at Cape York. He accepted and the Premier of Queensland, John Douglas, noted that Jardine would also be able to protect British interests in the area from the remnant Yadhaigana people who still offered resistance to colonisation.

== Return to Somerset ==
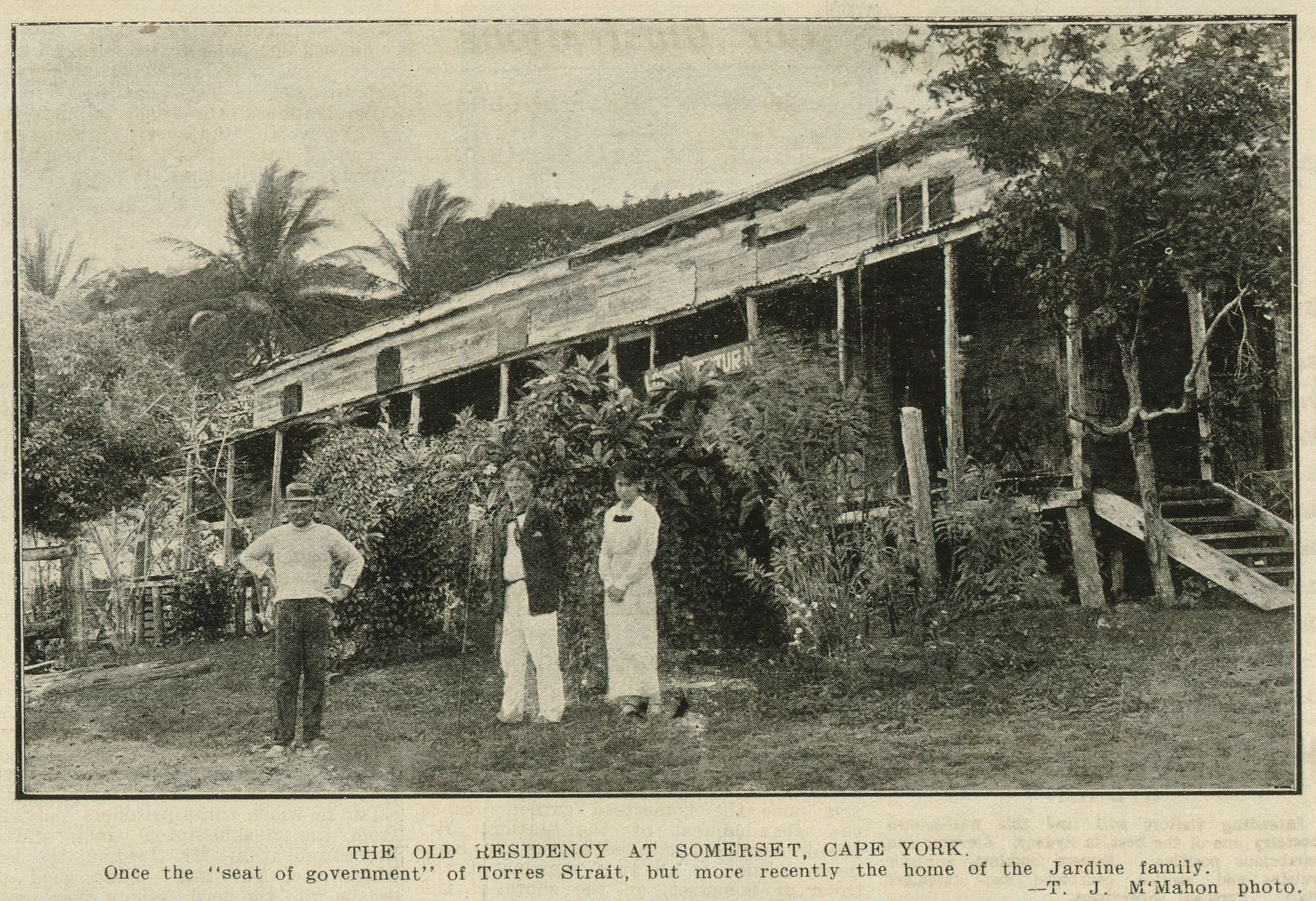
The Jardine family residence at Somerset, Cape York, 1917

Frank Jardine took possession of the buildings and the surrounding cattle stations at Somerset in January 1878. His pearling operations at Nagi Island were administered and eventually taken over by a cousin of Sana Solia named James Mills, the grandfather of the Mills Sisters. Jardine continued to reside with his family at Somerset for the next 41 years. Over this time period he expanded his pearling business, purchasing luggers that would collect shell from as far away as the eastern edges of the Great Barrier Reef and even the Louisiade Archipelago. Additionally, he entered into the trepanging industry and owned boats that would collect sea cucumber for the Asian markets. He also broadened his landholdings by establishing the Bertiehaugh cattle station on the Ducie River in 1882.

The Jardines consolidated themselves as prominent and respected figures in the region after the shipwreck of the RMS Quetta in 1890. This ship, carrying 292 people, hit an uncharted rock off Albany Island near Somerset and quickly sank. Jardine organised a rescue operation using his boats and crew which saved 36 people.

Jardine's ongoing battles with the local Indigenous population also continued. The original occupants of the Bertiehaugh property unsuccessfully attempted to displace his cattle establishment there in 1888. Punitive missions of the Native Police followed. Pearling and trepanging luggers that belonged to Jardine and other operators also blackbirded native people from the Bertiehaugh and Ducie River locality to work as forced labour. In 1893, one of Jardine's employees, Captain Samuel Rowe, was killed by a group of people who had been taken from the Ducie River. Two extensive Native Police operations were organised afterwards to inflict summary punishment to the Aboriginal people in the Bertiehaugh area. The Bertiehaugh property is now known as the Steve Irwin Wildlife Reserve and is owned by Terri Irwin.

== Jardine's treasure ==
In early 1891 one of Jardine's large pearl and trepang (beche-de-mer) fleet, schooner Lancashire Lass (1869–1895), Captain Samuel Rowe, reported finding a shipwreck on a coral reef whilst trepanging. The items recovered included an anchor, an iron cannon, and 160 lbs (72 kg) of Spanish dollars, estimated to be worth over £300. The dates of three coins were given, the oldest 1800, 1814, and a very indistinct 1833 appeared to be the youngest. The exact location of the wreck was kept secret.

The Thursday Island exports for 1891 May 22 included "6 boxes of specie" (coins) sent to London, England via the steamer Taroba.

In 1911 Jardine disclosed that he equipped one of his fleet for salvage and recovered a further ~15 cwt (~760 kg) of Spanish silver pillar dollars. The Queensland steamer Tara from Brisbane, called at Thursday Island about 1891 Nov 20 on its way to London, England. The Pall Mall Gazette (London) 1892 Jan 5 reported the arrival of a large quantity of specie, value many thousand pounds, being Torres Straits treasure. The next day the Liverpool Mercury reported "The steamship Tara has arrived from Brisbane with £6600 in specie."

In 1897 Percival Pitman Outridge (1863–1938) a pearl fleet owner, reported details of the coins. The Spanish dollars were dated 1713–1823, and the single gold coin recovered was a Spanish onza [ounce] dated 1819.

In 1911 Jardine disclosed that the wreck was located "in a lagoon of Portlock Reef", but did not give the exact location. Rowe in 1891 had said it was "on the extreme outer reef of the Great Barrier chain". Some describe Portlock Reef as the extreme northern limit of the Great Barrier Reef. Jardine persisted with his option that the ship was Spanish, so it appears that the ship's bell was not found. Spanish dollars were widely accepted, so it was not unusual for ships of many nations to carry significant quantities to pay for goods.

The ship was most likely the Sun (1819 ship), brig of Calcutta, Captain Gillett which departed Sydney 1826 May 10 with 40,000 Spanish dollars for Batavia, Singapore, Calcutta via Torres Strait. She was reported wrecked May 27 on a detached part of the Eastern Fields. The ship went to pieces almost immediately, 2 boats headed for Mer (Murray Island). The long boat with 24 were all lost on a reef within sight of Mer. The ship John Munroe picked up Capt. Gillett and 11 others Jun 1 at Mer and took them to Calcutta.

== Later life, death and legacy ==
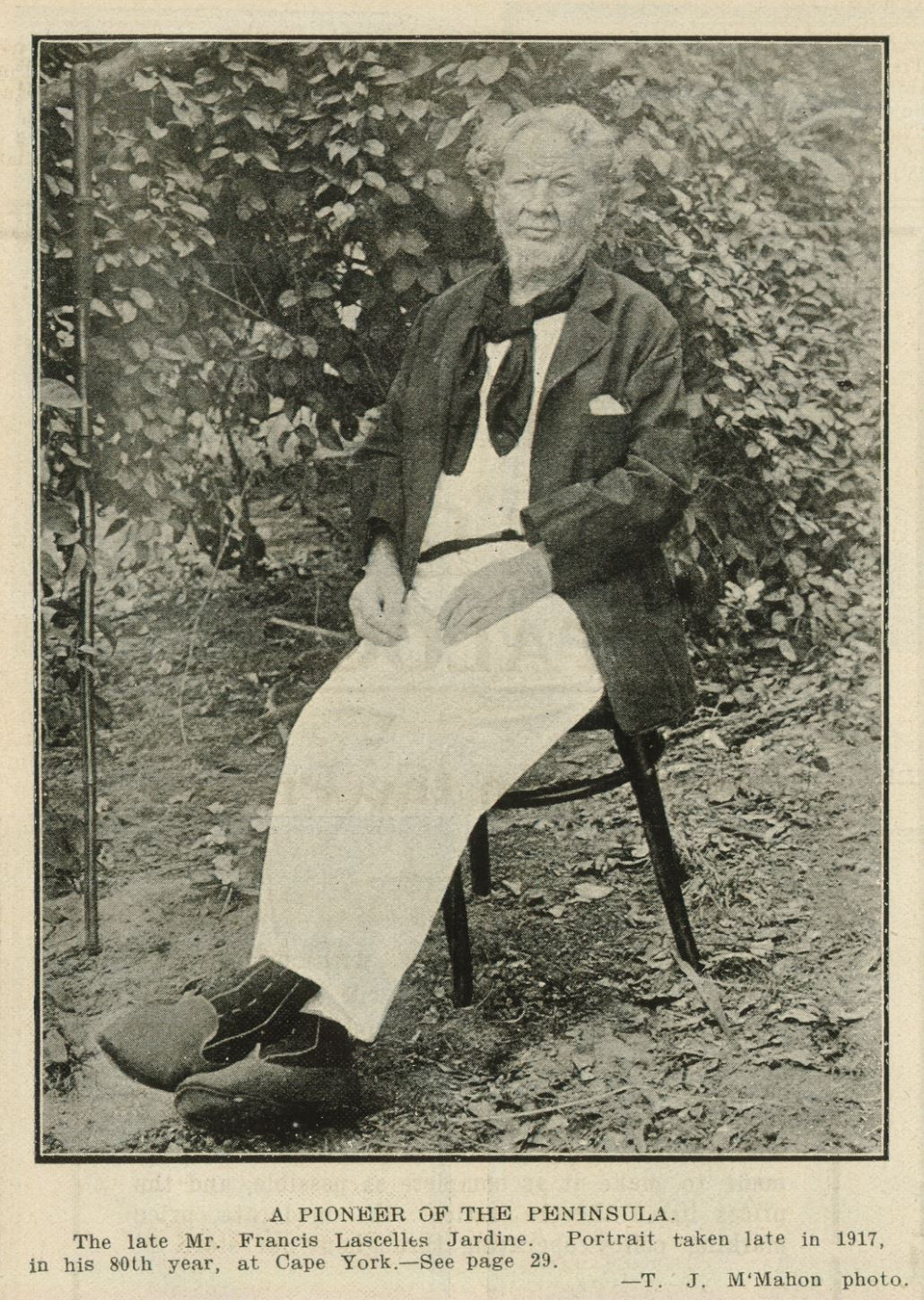
Francis Lascelles Jardine, 1917

In 1897 Jardine was recommended to the position of General Inspector of the pearl fisheries in the Torres Strait, but the appointment was not forthcoming. In the early 1900s he became a justice of the peace and presided over an inquiry into the whipping of an Aboriginal girl at Mapoon by a missionary. Old age and illness, however, increasingly kept him at the deteriorating Somerset homestead.

Frank Jardine died on 19 March 1919 of leprosy at the age of 77. He is buried at Somerset with his Samoan bride Sana Solia who died three years after him. Their graves are now part of the heritage-listed Somerset Graves Site.

The Jardine River is named after him as is a type of barramundi fish called Scleropages jardinii.

His life was adapted into the 1953 Australian radio feature, Cape York Pioneer.
