= Crab Island (Queensland) =

Island in Queensland

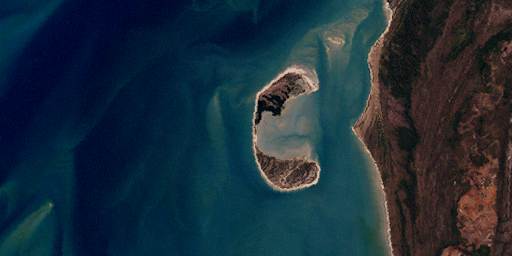
- Satellite image of Crab Island

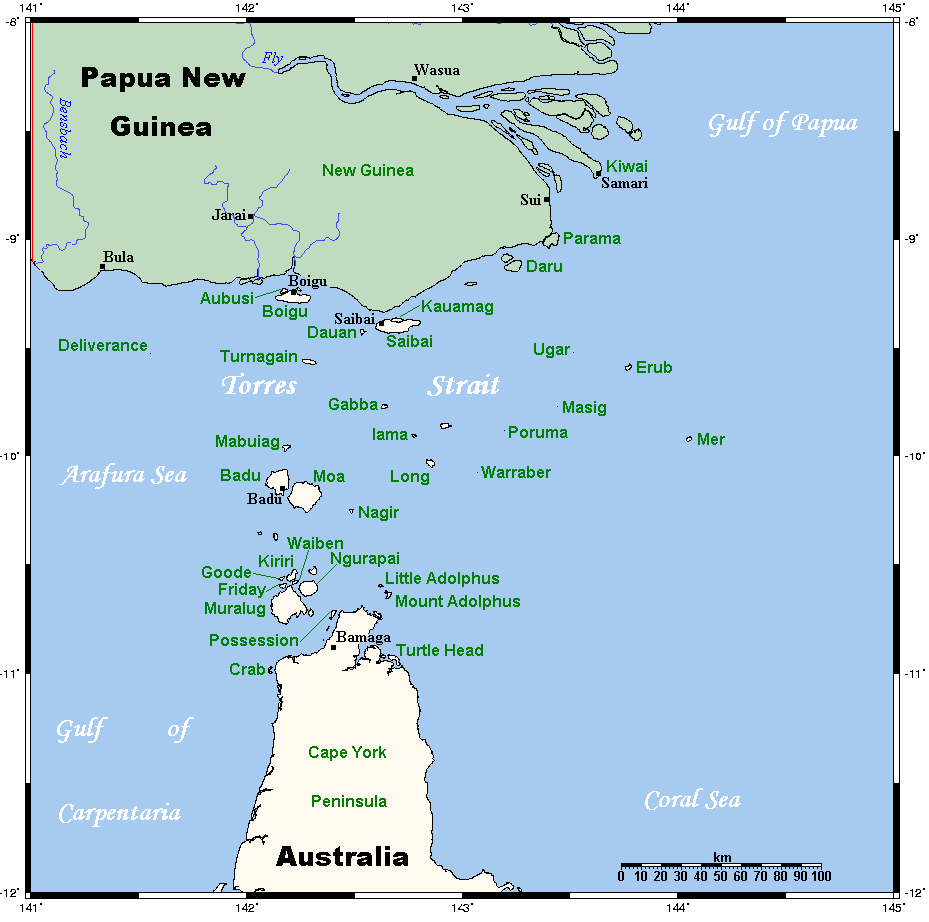
- A map of the Torres Strait Islands showing Crab Island in the Gulf of Carpentaria

Geography
- Location: Northern Australia
- Coordinates: 10.973°S 142.106°E
- Adjacent to: Gulf of Carpentaria
- Area: 2.8 km^{2} (1.1 sq mi)

Administration
- Australia
- State: Queensland

Demographics
- Population: Uninhabited

Crab Island, called Moent Island in the native language, is a now uninhabited island west of Muttee Heads and the coastal community of Seisia which is adjacent to Bamaga at the tip of Cape York Peninsula within the Endeavour Strait in the Gulf of Carpentaria in Queensland, Australia. It is around 280 hectares (690 acres). The distance to the closest mainland (close to Slade Point) is 1.4 kilometres (0.87 mi). The original inhabitants were the Apukwi branch of the Ankamuti.

Crab Island lies between Australia and the Melanesian island of New Guinea in the southwestern part of the Torres Strait, facing the Arafura Sea to the west. It is the most significant breeding ground of the flatback turtle (Natator depressus) and there is occasional nesting by the hawksbill sea turtle (Eretmochelys imbricata) and olive ridley sea turtle (Lepidochelys olivacea) the island it has predators like saltwater crocodile.

This island is south of the Torres Strait Islands.

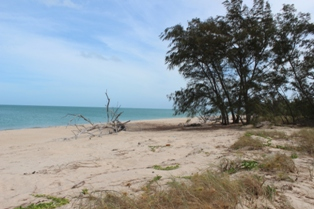
Crab Island, Cape York

== See also ==
- List of Torres Strait Islands
