= Unduyamo =

Aboriginal Australian people

The Unduyamo (Andooyomo) were an indigenous Australian people who once lived around the northern shore of Newcastle Bay, Cape York Peninsula Queensland. It has been hypothesized that, among other aspects of their life, they functioned as religious specialists for Torres Strait Islanders, whose mastery of increase rituals attracted the native mariners from the north. Together with the Gudang, who apparently spoke the same language and whose territory ran from Cape York to Fly Point opposite Pabaju (Albany Island), the Unduyamo had strong cultural, kin and trade ties with the Kaurareg, the southwestern islanders centered on Muralag, with whom they enjoyed an alliance that permitted reciprocal residence on each other's territory. All three groups regarded the Yadhaigana and Gumakudin as hostile.

Archaeology has uncovered a dense network of ritual sites consisting of stone rings and turtle mounds in various forms located on rocky headlands jutting forth towards Torres Strait which are thought to have functioned as sentinels or "approach points" for travellers from the north, in the areas associated with the Gudang and Unduyamo peoples. According to Greer, McIntyre-Tamwoy and Henry these stoneworks were raised by ritual specialists among these northern Cape tribes for ceremonial purposes associated with initiation rites and increase magic, for example to ensure the reproduction of maritime species prized by hunters, such as the dugong.
