= Mcdonald River =

River in Queensland, Australia

Mcdonald Macdonald; Collett
- Location of Mcdonald River mouth in Queensland

Location
- Country: Australia
- State: Queensland
- Region: Far North Queensland

Physical characteristics
- Source: Great Dividing Range
- Source confluence: two unnamed creeks
  - coordinates: 11°31′32″S 142°08′14″E
  - elevation: 13 m (43 ft)
- Mouth: Gulf of Carpentaria
  - location: north of Mapoon
  - coordinates: 11°32′11″S 142°04′08″E
  - elevation: 0 m (0 ft)
- Length: 11 km (6.8 mi)
- Basin size: 2,723 km^{2} (1,051 sq mi)

The Mcdonald River, also known as the Macdonald River and locally as the Collett River, is a river in Far North Queensland, Australia.

The headwaters of the river rise in the foothills of the Great Dividing Range on Cape York Peninsula. Formed by the confluence of two unnamed creeks, the river flows in a westerly direction eventually discharging to the Gulf of Carpentaria, north of Mapoon. The river descends 14 metres (46 ft) over its 12-kilometre (7.5 mi) course.

The river has a catchment area of 2,723 square kilometres (1,051 sq mi) of which an area of 105 square kilometres (41 sq mi) is composed of estuarine wetlands.

== See also ==
- List of rivers of Australia § Queensland
