= Jardine River =

Jardine
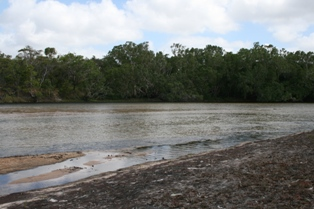
- Jardine River

- Location of Jardine River mouth in Queensland
- Etymology: Frank and Alexander Jardine

Location
- Country: Australia
- State: Queensland
- Region: Far North Queensland

Physical characteristics
- Source: Great Dividing Range
  - elevation: 100 m (330 ft)
- Mouth: Gulf of Carpentaria, Coral Sea
  - location: Endeavour Strait
  - coordinates: 10°57′0″S 142°13′50″E
  - elevation: 0 m (0 ft)
- Length: 162 km (101 mi)
- Basin size: 3,282 km^{2} (1,267 sq mi) to 2,734.4 km^{2} (1,055.8 sq mi)
- Discharge
  - location: Near mouth
  - average: 82.6 m^{3}/s (2,610 GL/a)

Basin features
- Tributaries
  - left: McHenry River
- National park: Apudthama National Park

The Jardine River, formally known as Deception River, is the largest river of the Cape York Peninsula in Far North Queensland, Australia.

== Course ==
The headwaters of the river rise southwest of Helby Hill in the Great Dividing Range and flow in a north westerly direction parallel to the McHenry River through the Apudthama National Park. The McHenry eventually discharges into the Jardine, which continues north west combining with multiple other tributaries as it flows into the flatlands of the Jardine Swamps. It eventually discharges into Endeavour Strait near Van Spoult Head opposite Prince of Wales Island and into the northern waters of the Gulf of Carpentaria, part of the Coral Sea.

Unlike other tropical rivers in Northern Australia, the Jardine flows all year round as the catchment receives sufficient rainfall throughout the year for it to do so.

The river catchment occupies an area of 3,282 square kilometres (1,267 sq mi) of mostly uninhabited country; some 219 square kilometres (85 sq mi) of the catchment is made up of mostly freshwater wetlands. The river has a mean annual discharge of 2,190 gigalitres (4.82×10^{11} imp gal; 5.79×10^{11} US gal).

== Fauna ==
A total of 46 species of fish are found in the river, including sailfin glassfish, Macleay's glassfish, barred grunter, marbled eel, hardyhead, pennyfish, mouth almighty, goby, empire gudgeon, barramundi, oxeye herring, northern trout gudgeon, seven-spot archerfish and banded rainbowfish.

The Jardine River painted turtle, previously thought to have been extinct after not being sighted in the river for 20 years, was discovered in the Jardine again in 2014. A team of Apudthama Cape York rangers and scientists from Origin Energy have trapped 24 of the turtles at two different locations using new trapping methods.

== History ==
The traditional owners of the area are the Unjadi and Ankamuti peoples, who have lived in the area for thousands of years.

The river is named after the explorers and pioneers Frank Jardine and Alexander Jardine. The men came across the river as part of their 1864 expedition through Far North Queensland. In early 1865 the Jardines had just survived a pitched battle with the local Indigenous Australians and had some horses drown while crossing the Batavia River. The party was low on ammunition and food when they came across a stream they thought was an escape but was not; they named it Deception River. The name was later changed by the government of George Bowen to the Jardine River.

== See also ==
- List of rivers of Australia § Queensland
