= Gudang language =

Australian Aboriginal language

Gudang
- Region: Cape York Peninsula, Queensland, Australia
- Ethnicity: Djagaraga, Unduyamo
- Extinct: unknown; perhaps 1880s
- Language family: Pama–Nyungan: Paman; North Cape York; Northern; Gudang
- Dialects: Djagaraga

Language codes
- ISO 639-3: Either: xgd – Gudang yty – Yatay
- Glottolog: guda1244 Gudang
- AIATSIS: Y191 Gudang, Y232 Yatay

Gudang or Djagaraga (Pantyinamu/Yatay/Gudang/Kartalaiga and other clans) is an Australian Aboriginal language. It is the traditional language of the Gudang people, and is the northernmost language of the Cape York Peninsula in Queensland. It is closely related to Urradhi (dialects Urradhi, Angkamuthi, Yadhaykenu, Wudhadhi, etc.), its neighbour to the south, and distantly related to its neighbour to the north, the Western-Central Torres Strait Language (Kalaw Lagaw Ya), from which it borrowed quite a few vocabulary items.

== Phonology ==
Going by the records of the language recorded in MacGillivray and Brierly, as well as comparing these with their Urradhi and WCL counterparts, the phonology of the language appeared to have been as follows:

vowels : i, ii; e, ee; a, aa; u, uu

The high vowels i, ii and u, uu had mid variants, thus [e, eː] and [o, oː]. Some Western-Central Torres Strait Language (WCL; see Kalau Lagau Ya) loans probably retained the WCL vowels unchanged. The vowels e/ ee otherwise appear to have had a similar marginal status as in Urradhi (Crowley 1983:317).

=== Consonants ===
Orthographical differences to the IPA transcription is indicated in brackets.

		Labial	Velar	Labiovelar	Lamino-dental	Lamino-palatal	Alveolar	Retroflex
Plosive	voiceless	p	k	kʷ ⟨kw⟩	t̪ ⟨th⟩	tʃ ⟨ch⟩	t	ʈ ⟨rt⟩
Plosive	voiced	b	g		d̪ ⟨dh⟩	dʒ ⟨j⟩	d	
Lateral					l			
Nasal		m	ŋ ⟨ng⟩		n̪ ⟨nh⟩	ɲ ⟨ny⟩	n	
Approximant				w		j ⟨y⟩		ɻ ⟨r⟩
Rhotic								r ⟨rr⟩

The non-sonorant sounds appear to have had voice contrasts, except after nasals, when both voiced and voiceless allophones occurred, with the voiced allophones seemingly more common. While the lamino-dental and alveolar contrast was not marked by the European recorders, the Urradhi and WCL cognates strongly suggest that it existed.

== Differences between Gudang and Urradhi ==
The main differences in phonology between Gudang and the Urradhi dialects appears to be:

1. Voiced stops existed where Urradhi has voiced fricatives, in part because of WCL loans, thus Urradhi /β/ ⟨v⟩, /ð/ ⟨dh⟩, and /ɣ/ ⟨g⟩) correspond to Gudang b, dh and g. Note that in ipadha 'father', Gudang p corresponds to Urradhi /β/ (ivadha), both representing Proto-Paman *piipa, proto Gudang-Urradhi *piipata.
2. Gudang had reflexive rt from Proto Paman *r and *rr
  Proto-Paman *warapa 'water, stream', Urradhi atava, Gudang artaba
  Proto-Paman *mara 'hand', Urradhi mata, Gudang arta
  Proto-Paman *yurru 'elbow', Urradhi yutu (Angkamuthi yurtu), Gudang yurtu
  Proto-Paman *murunya 'shin', Urradhi mutuny (Angkamuthi murtuny), Gudang urtunya
3. A slightly higher rate of initial dropping (including initial syllables) was evident in Gudang.
4. Gudang retained final CV syllables where Urradhi has reduced these to C.
5. Gudang had word final -rra where Urradhi has -l, and stronger retention of rr and l in the clusters rrk and lk (e.g. see ukarra and ralkagamarra).
6. Gudang had virtually no trace of the utterance final suppletion very evident in Urradhi (e.g. mata > matang, matak), the one exception being anhadhing. However, initial and final vowel elision appeared to have been the norm.
7. There was a strong tendency in Gudang for u to become i before following palatals (and perhaps elsewhere) (e.g. inyaanha, ikuurra).

The statistics of the comparisons are listed below.

Raw Scores
	Cognates	Possible Cognates	Non-Cognate	WCL Loans	Possible WCL Loans	Total
Gudang	76	11	157	41	4	200
Yadhaykenu	76	10	93	11	2	182
Atampaya	58	11	116	7	2	191
Angkamuthi	53	11	157	9	2	178

Percentages
	Cognates	Possible Cognates	Non-Cognate	WCL Loans	Possible WCL Loans
Gudang	38%	5.5%	78.5%	20.5%	2.1%
Yadhaykenu	42.5%	5.9%	51%	3.8%	1%
Atampaya	31.4%	5.9%	61%	3.7%	1%
Angkamuthi	33.8%	7%	88%	5%	1%

These figures show that Gudang was a separate language from the Urradhi group.

== Gudang and the Western-Central Language of Torres Strait (Kalau Lagau Ya) ==
Gudang shares about 20% of its words with Kalau Lagau Ya (termed WCL = Western-Central Language here-in) due to loaning between the languages. It is obvious from MacGillivray, Brierly and Ray that there was extensive intermarriage and contacts between the Gudang and the Islanders, particularly but not exclusively with the people of the Muralag group (commonly called the Kowrareg people). The data Brierly and others collected from Barbara Thompson and local people show that where marriage, clan membership and other cultural aspects were concerned, that the Gudang fitted as much into the Islanders' world as in the neighbouring Urradhi world. Also, it appeared that the Gudang were on the whole bilingual in WCL, and this perhaps reflects the fact that so many WCL words were recorded as being Gudang by MacGillivray. We will probably never know how many such recorded words were mistakes on his part, by him or his informants misunderstanding which language was being asked for.

== Loans or Possible Loans from the Western-Central Language of Torres Strait (Kala Lagaw Ya) ==
The following words vary from clear to possible loans from WCL into Gudang and Urradhi. This is shown by the phonology of the words (retention of consonant initials and other phonological 'oddities' from the point of view of Gudang and Urradhi). Most are fairly recent, however, some, such as sara 'tern', are older in that the Urradhi dialects have undergone sound changes similar to those undergone by Paman word stock. Possible loans are marked (?).

WCL aap(a) garden : G (?)ampa ground, soil, cf Y ampimana clearing

WCL aga(thurik) axe : G aga, Y agha

WCL apa- lower, below, down, underneath : G apa lower back

WCL baag(a) jaw : G baaga cheek

WCL bœbath(a) grandparent : G bubaatha grandfather

WCL buru (saw)dust, chips, crumbs : G burruburru ash(es)

WCL daan(a) eye : G daanha

WCL dhumowak(u), dhœmuwak(u) cloth, clothes : G dhumook

WCL (KLY/KulY/KY) dhuyum(a) thunder : Y unhthuymu, At unhthumu, A unhthuymu thunder (The relationship between Urradhi unthuymu and WCL dhuyum(a) is unclear – if there is any. A loan in either direction is possible, though the initial syllable in Urradhi might suggest that the word is a loan from WCL into Urradhi. Compare the Yadhaikenu word angkapa hat, from English cap).

WCL dœnasam(u) eyelash (OKY also samudaana) : G caamudaanha

WCL gii knife (OKY giri) : G giiri, Y ghiri, At kiri, A kiri

WCL iibu chin : G iibu

WCL kab(a) (OKY kœraba) paddle : G karaaba

WCL kat(a) frog, underjaw part of jaw; neck (in compounds), Bœigu sub-dialect kœteko, kœteku frog : G kartakarta green frog (recorded as kartakatta), Y akarrakarra

WCL katham(a) (plural kathamal) banana (fruit) : G katamarra, Y katamarra, A katamarra

WCL kausar(a) inland pandanus, bœruwa young kausar : G burwa, kwacherra pandanus

WCL kayadh grandmother : G kayadha grandmother

WCL kùn(a) stern (kona/cona was recorded for OKY by Brierly and MacGillivray) : G koona or kuuna

WCL (KLY/KulY/KY) kùpai, (KLY) kùpa, OKY kùpar birth cord, (KLY/KulY/KY) maithakùpai, (KLY) maithakùp, OKY maithakùpar navel [maitha belly, stomach); cf. kùp(a) bottom, base : G kupara

WCL mabar(a) small mangrove conch with spikes : G mabarr, At mavarra k.o. shell

WCL makas(a) mouse, rat; wœsar(a) kangaroo, wallaby : G maakacha, Y (?)wacharra, At (?)acharra, (?)acharraki, A (?)wacharra mouse

WCL met(a) dugong flipper, arm : G merta fin

WCL mœrap(i), (KLY) mœraapi bamboo : G marraapi, Y marrapi, At marrapi, A marrapi

WCL mùdh(a) shelter, hut, back-yard, haven, place/spot protected from the wind : G mudha

WCL muugu ant/termite hill/nest [generic term], white ant, termite : G muungku, Y mungka, At mungka, A mungka (red) anthill

WCL ngaga bird/stingray wing : G ngaaga wing

WCL paad(a) hill, tip, top, height : G pada hill, paada head

WCL patha- cut, chop : A ipaata cut, chop

WCL puuy(i), (OKY) puuri (variant upœri) magic charm/gear/medecine (i.e. the material and language used in magic, but not the magic itself, which is maidh) : G upiirri medecine, Y upirri, At upirri, A upirri sore, painful; witchcraft

WCL puuy(i), OKY puuri tree, plant, post, pole, log : G puri tree

WCL saan(a) dugong tail : G canha fish tail

WCL sara tern : G carra tern, Y charra, At iyarra seagull

WCL sayima (OKY sarima) outrigger : G carima

WCL sœguba tobacco : G cuuka, cooka, Y/At/A (The Gudang forms are perhaps an early loan from Malay coki, otherwise is an abbreviated form of an unrecorded cukuba)

WCL sœka lungs (of turtle and dugong)) : G caaka lungs

WCL tete animal/bird leg, cf. MM teter lower leg, upper foot : G tetarr finger/toe nail

WCl thawal coast, shore, shoreline : G thawarr seaweed (the WCL word suggests a miscommunication between MacGillivray and his informant(s), mistaking seaweed for coast, shore, shoreline)

WCL thœyap(u) wrist, OKY thœrapu : G theraapi wrist, forearm

WCL thuugu outrigger pole : G thuugu

WCL uru / wœru rope, sisaluru type of rope : G cicalurru

WCL urui creature, bird : G wurruy creature

WCL uur / wur / wœr water : G (?) uurru boil

WCL waapi fish : G waapi

WCL waaru turtle, green turtle : G waarru, Y iwurru, A waru

WCL wagel(a) after, behind : G wagel thunder (as thunder always follows lightning, wagel may have been recorded by MacGillivray through a misunderstanding)

WCL wapadha cotton tree : G waapadha, Y wapadha, At wapara, A wapadha

WCL walap(a) hat : G walaapa, At walapan, A walapan

WCL warup(a) hour-glass-shaped drum : G warrupa, Y arupa, At arupa, A arupa drum

WCL wœnawa shell turtle : G wanawa, At wanawa turtle shell

WCL wœrab(a), wurab(a), urab(a) coconut; G warraaba, At warrava

WCL (KKY/KY/KLY) yatha, (KulY) yetha beard : G yetha

WCL (KLY, KulY, KY) yathai, (KLY) yatha, (OKY) yathar spider shell : Y yathal, A yathaa nail, spider shell

WCL yœuth(a) long house, hall, church : Y yutha, A yutha hut, house, church
