= Yadhaykenu =

Australian aboriginal tribe of northern Queensland

The Yadhaykenu, otherwise known as the Jathaikana or Yadhaigana, are an Aboriginal Australian tribe of northern Queensland. The name appears to be an exonym from the Western and Central Torres Strait (Kalau Lagau Ya) yadaigal (Kaurareg dialect yařadaigalai~yařadegale) "talkers, chatterers, people who speak a lot".

== Language ==
The Yadhaykenu language was a dialect of Uradhi, a group of dialects marked by their use of variants of urra for 'this'. For example, in the Wudhadhi dialect, just south of Yadhaykenu, urra is realised as wudha.

== Country ==
The Yadhaykenu had, in Norman Tindale's estimation, some 300 square miles (780 km^{2}) of territory southwards from the Escape River to the vicinity of Orford Ness. This covers the area extending from Escape River to Pudding Pan Hill in the Cape York Peninsula. Their numbers at the time of contact with colonial pastoralists who took over their land in the 1860s has been estimated to range between 1,500 and 1,600.

== History ==
The Yadhaigana were traditional enemies of the Gudang, Alfred Cort Haddon (Head Hunters, Black, White and Brown, ph 190 ) stated in the 1880s that the Gudang had died out, or at all events none now live in their own country, the same remark also applies to the neighbouring tribes.Together with the neighbouring Unduyamo and Gudang aboriginal tribes, they were regarded as warlike by the colonial authorities and settlers who moved into their lands and encountered their resistance. Writing in 1864, the Scottish immigrant John Jardine (1807–1874), from 1863 to 1865 the police magistrate at the newly established Somerset settlement. thought of these natives in his area of administration 'to be in a lower state of degradation, mentally and physically, than any of the Australian aboriginal tribes which I have seen'.

British marines stationed at Somerset were withdrawn in 1868, and native troopers under Henry Chester set about dispersing the local tribes with terror tactics, punitive forays, and by adopting methods such as inciting one tribe against another. The young men and women were subject to Blackbirding in order to obtain slave labour on pearling boats. Two Anglican missionaries present Rev F Jagg and William Kennett wrote on protest at the shocking conditions the tribes were subject to, only to be speedily removed. Internecine hostilities, already frequent, flared between the Yadhaigana and their Gumakudin neighbours as settlement expanded, and eventually the latter were absorbed by the former. Within three decades of settlement, of the estimated 3,000 Aborigines belonging to the three tribes, only a 100 remained.

After the shattering of the traditional east-coast tribal groupings and their dispersal, many remnants of each group intermarried and a new more collective identity was formed at Red Island Point, from descendants or survivors of the Wuthgathi, Yadhaigana, Gudong and Unduyamo, who came to be known as the Red Island Point tribes. By virtue of this amalgamation, the Yadhaigana, as part of their native title claim, consider themselves heir to the old Gumakudin lands extending from Pudding Pan Hill, across Utingu, Red Island Point, Injinoo to Muttee Head on the southwest of the York Peninsula.

== Native title ==
In 2008 the Gudang Yadhaykenu together with the Atampaya and Seven Rivers Angkamuth communities, made an application for native title, which was successful in 2014, when their right to 680,000ha of land was recognized. In 2017 the Gudang Yadhaykenu leaders representing some 2000 people signed a development deal with former Macquarie banker Bill Moss to lease areas in 360,000ha and set up tourism and agribusinesses, with trust funds set aside for improvements in Gudang Yadhaykenu health care, education and employment opportunities.

== Alternative names ==
- Induyamo
- Yadaigan
- Yaldaigan
- Yandigan
- Yaraidyana
- Yaraikana
- Yaraikanna, Yaraikkanna
- Yarakino
- Yardaikan
- Yarudolaiga (Kaurareg exonym, correct form Yařadaigalai)
- Yathaikeno

Source: Tindale 1974, p. 170

== Sources ==
- Bayton, John (27 May 1965). The Mission to the Aborigines at Somerset (PDF). Royal Historical Society of Queensland. pp. 622–633. ISBN 978-0-855-75230-9.
- Byerley, Frederick J. (1867). Narrative of the overland expedition of the Messrs. Jardine from Rockhampton to Cape York, northern Queensland. Brisbane. Brisbane: J.W. Buxton. Archived from the original on 4 June 2010.
- Condon, Turi (10 March 2017). "Deal seals bright future in Top End". The Australian. Archived from the original on 5 April 2017.
- Creed (1878). Ridley, William (ed.). "Australian Languages and Traditions". Journal of the Anthropological Institute of Great Britain and Ireland. 7: 266–268. doi:10.2307/2841001. JSTOR 2841001.
- Crowley, Terry (1983). "Uradhi". In Dixon, Robert M. W.; Blake, Barry J. (eds.). Handbook of Australian languages. Vol. 3. Australian National University Press. pp. 306–428. ISBN 978-9-027-22005-9.
- Dixon, Robert M. W. (2002). Australian Languages: Their Nature and Development. Vol. 1. Cambridge University Press. ISBN 978-0-521-47378-1.
- Harper, Helen (2016). "The story of Old Man Frank: a narrative response to questions about language shift in northern Cape York Peninsula". In Verstraete, Jean-Christophe; Hafner, Diane (eds.). Land and Language in Cape York Peninsula and the Gulf Country. John Benjamins Publishing. pp. 409–433. ISBN 978-9-027-26760-3.
- Lack, Clem (1972). "Jardine, Francis Lascelles (Frank) (1841–1919)". Australian Dictionary of Biography. Vol. 4. Melbourne University Press.
- Mathew, R. H. (1900). "Some tribes of Cape York Peninsula". Proceedings of the Royal Society of New South Wales. 34: 131–135.
- McConnel, Ursula H. (September 1939). "Social Organization of the Tribes of Cape York Peninsula, North Queensland". Oceania. 10 (1): 54–72. doi:10.1002/j.1834-4461.1939.tb00256.x. JSTOR 40327744.
- McConnel, Ursula H. (June 1940). "Social Organization of the Tribes of Cape York Peninsula, North Queensland (Continued)". Oceania. 10 (4): 434–455. doi:10.1002/j.1834-4461.1940.tb00305.x. JSTOR 40327867.
- Parker, K. Langloh (1905). The Euahlayi tribe; a study of aboriginal life in Australia (PDF). A. Constable & Co.
- Ray, Sydney H. (1907). Linguistics (PDF). Reports of the Cambridge Anthropological Expedition to Torres Straits. Vol. 3. Cambridge University Press. pp. 264–283, 504–528.
- Sharp, Nonie (1992). Footprints Along the Cape York Sandbeaches. Aboriginal Studies Press. ISBN 978-0-855-75230-9.
- Tindale, Norman Barnett (1974). "Jathaikana (QLD)". Aboriginal Tribes of Australia: Their Terrain, Environmental Controls, Distribution, Limits, and Proper Names. Australian National University. ISBN 978-0-708-10741-6. Archived from the original on 9 April 2017.
- Vlasic, Kimberley (30 October 2014). "680,000ha of northern Cape York handed back to traditional owners from the Atampaya, Gudang Yadhaykenu and Seven Rivers Angkamuth Peoples". The Cairns Post.
