= Henry Chester =

Henry Marjoribanks Chester (30 December 1832 – 3 October 1914) was a public servant and police magistrate in colonial Queensland.

Chester was born in London, England, son of William Chester, and educated at Christ's Hospital, the London School in Newgate Street and the Royal Mathematical School. In 1849 Chester entered the service of the Indian navy and remained an officer in it until its abolition in 1862.

Chester was in the Queensland Government service from 1876, and in 1877 was sent on an exploring expedition to New Guinea. In July of the next year Chester was appointed by Arthur Hamilton-Gordon, 1st Baron Stanmore to represent him in New Guinea in his capacity as High Commissioner of the Western Pacific. In 1883, when Sir Thomas McIlwraith decided on annexing the island on behalf of the Queensland Government, Chester was employed to proclaim the Queen's sovereignty, which he carried into effect on 4 April. Chester was a police magistrate at Croydon, Queensland from November 1887. Chester was transferred to Cooktown in 1891, to Clermont in 1898 and Gladstone in 1902.

Chester died in Brisbane, Queensland, Australia, on 3 October 1914; he was survived by two of his three sons.

Frank Jardine and Henry Chester (who was a temporary replacement magistrate at Somerset) conducted at least two large punitive expeditions on Muralag Island. In July 1869, Jardine led his native troopers and armed crewmen from the blackbirding vessel Melanie in a dawn raid on a village on the island killing many people. Chester, in April of 1870 would lead an armed group on a raid, which resulted in the burning down of Muralag village, 20 men being captured and at least three executions.
