= Alexander William Jardine =

Australian engineer and geographer

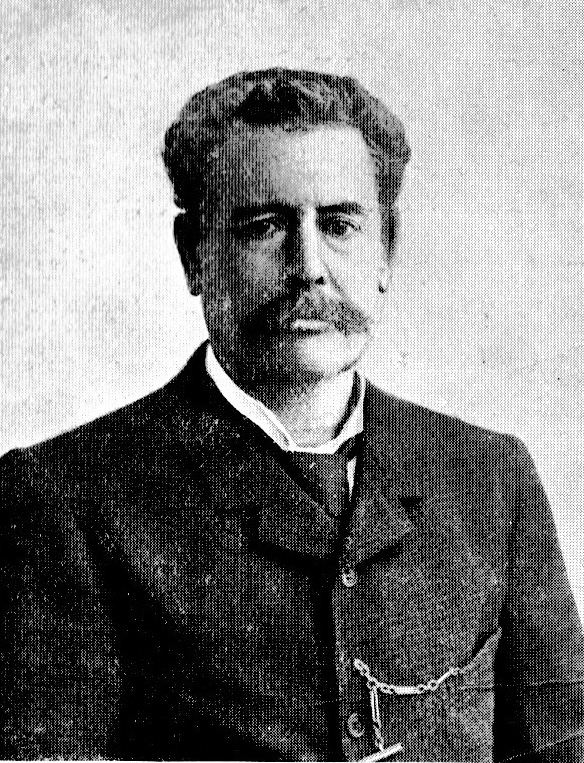
ALEXANDER JARDINE. From "The Explorers of Australia and Their Life-Work" by Ernest Favenc, page 126. Published in 1908 by Whitcombe and Tomds Ltd.

Alexander William Jardine (9 October 1843 – 20 March 1920), A.M.I.C.E., made a trip from Rockhampton, Queensland, Australia to Somerset, Queensland in 1864. Details are provided in the entry for his brother, Frank Jardine who also took part in the trip.

The Royal Geographical Society rewarded the labours of the two brothers by electing them Fellows of the Society, and by awarding them the Murchison Award.

Jardine was born on 9 October 1843 near Sydney, New South Wales, Australia. He served on many government works in Queensland, became chief engineer for harbours and rivers and died in London on 20 March 1920.

On 4 January 1883, at St. John's Church, Brisbane, Jardine married Charlotte Elizabeth Mosman, of Sydney.
