= Brother Island =

Brother Island, Brothers Island, etc. may refer to any of several islands and island groups:

== In the United States ==
- Brother Island, Niagara River, in New York State, near the Horseshoe Falls
- First Brother Island in the Ohio River, West Virginia, near Belmont
- North and South Brother Islands (Connecticut), in the Atlantic Ocean off East Lyme, Connecticut
- North and South Brother Islands (New York City), in the East River between the Bronx and Rikers Island
- The Brothers (San Francisco Bay), two islands, East and West, in California
- The Brothers, Humboldt County, two rocks in Humboldt County, California about 6 miles from the town of Petrolia
- Three Brothers Island, California, a tiny island in Humboldt County, California about 5 miles from the town of Petrolia
- Three Brothers (islands), Alaska, a reef near Shakmanof Point, Kodiak Island, Alaska
- Three Brothers islands, in Lake George, near Bolton, New York State

== Elsewhere ==
- Brother Isle in the Shetland archipelago, Scotland, UK
- Great Iyu Island and Little Iyu Island, also known as The Brothers, in the Strait of Malacca
- Middle Brother Islet, Queensland in the Torres Strait off Queensland, Australia
- The Brothers (Andaman Islands), in the Andaman Archipelago, Indian Ocean
  - North Brother Island (Andaman Islands)
  - South Brother Island (Andaman Islands)
- Pandang Island and Salahnama Island, also known as The Brothers, in the Strait of Malacca
- Rukan Islands also known as Three Brothers (North, Middle and South) at the south entrance of Durian Strait, Indonesia
- Seven Brothers (islands) in the Bab-el-Mandeb strait off Djibouti
- The Brothers (New Zealand), in Cook Strait
- The Brothers (islands), Hong Kong, East and West, in the mouth of the Pearl River
- The Brothers, Egypt in the Red Sea
- The Brothers, Greece in the Aegean Sea
- Samhah and Darsah, an island pair in the Socotra archipelago, off the Horn of Africa, known as "The Brothers" (Arabic: Al-Ikhwān)
- Three Brothers (islands), Chagos (North, Middle and South) in the Chagos Archipelago, Indian Ocean
- Three Brothers, Lake Baikal, at Cape Sagan Khushun, near Olkhon, Lake Baikal, Russia
- Three Brothers, Okhotsk Sea, three large rocks off Veselaya Bay, near the town of Magadan, Kamchatka, Russia
- Three Brothers or Tri Brata, three tall rocks in the Avacha Bay of Kamchatka, Russia

== See also ==
- Sister Island (disambiguation)
- Isabel Island (Philippines) and Carlota Island in the Philippines, formerly comprising the barrio of Isla de los Hermanos ("Brothers Island")
- Eadie Island, Aspland Island, and O'Brien Island in the South Shetland archipelago off Antarctica, called Ostrova Tri Brata ("Three Brothers Islands") by their Russian discoverer
- Riddarholmen, an islet in central Stockholm, sometimes called Gråbrödraholm ("Grey Brothers Islet") between the 13th and 17th centuries
