= Three Brothers =

Three Brothers may refer to:

== Film and television ==
- Three Brothers (1944 film), a U.S. Army animated short by Friz Freleng
- Three Brothers (1981 film), an Italian film by Francesco Rosi
- Three Brothers (2014 film), a film by Jan Svěrák
- Three Brothers (TV series), a 2009 South Korean drama
- The Three Brothers (film), a 1995 French comedy film

== Literature ==
- "The Three Brothers", a story from Grimms' Fairy Tales
- Three brothers of Mémoires de M. d'Artagnan: Henri d'Aramitz, Armand d'Athos and Isaac de Porthau

== Places ==
=== Russia ===
- Three Brothers, Okhotsk Sea, three large rocks off Eastern Cape, Kamchatka, Russia
- Tri Brata ("Three Brothers"), three rocks in the Avacha Bay, Kamchatka, Russia

=== United Kingdom ===
- Three Brothers, Chagos, a group of coral islands in the Indian Ocean, subject of dispute between the UK and Mauritius
- Three Brothers, Lancashire, a group of rocks in England
- Three Brothers, South Georgia, British Overseas Territory, a group of three mountain peaks
- Three Brothers Hill, King George Island, South Shetland Islands, UK

=== United States ===
- Three Brothers (islands), Alaska, U.S.
- Three Brothers, Arkansas, U.S., an unincorporated community
- Three Brothers (Ozarks), a group of summits in Arkansas, U.S.
- Three Brothers (Yosemite), a rock formation in Yosemite Valley, California, U.S.
- Three Brothers (Washington), U.S., triple-peak mountain summit

=== Elsewhere ===
- "Ostrova Tri Brata" ("Three Brothers Islands"), Antarctica: Aspland Island, Eadie Island, and O'Brien Island
- Three Brothers (islands), Indonesia, or Rukan Islands
- Three Brothers (New South Wales), three mountains in Australia

== Ships ==
- Three Brothers (ship), a steam freighter that sank in 1911 near South Manitou Island on the Great Lakes
- USS Vanderbilt (1862) or Three Brothers, a steamship in the Civil War convert to a sailing ship for transporting grain

== Other uses ==
- Three brothers, an Australian theatre project, performed in 2017 under the name Djurra
- Three Brothers (jewel), a lost medieval pendant once owned by Jakob Fugger, Elizabeth I, and others
- Three Brothers, Riga, a cluster of medieval houses in Riga
- Three Brothers Serbian Restaurant, in Milwaukee, U.S.

== See also ==
- The Brothers Three, a pizza company
- "The Tale of the Three Brothers", a story in J. K. Rowling's The Tales of Beedle the Bard
- Third Brother (Chinese: 三哥; pinyin: sāngē), Chinese slang for India or an Indian person, based on the ethnic slur āsān (阿三)
