= South Brother Island =

South Brother Island may refer to:

- North and South Brother Islands, New York, in New York State, USA off the coast
- South Brother Island, Connecticut, USA, in the Atlantic Ocean off Eat Lyme
- South Brother (Chagos Bank) (Île du Sud), one of the Three Brothers islands in the Chagos Archipelago, British Indian Ocean Territory
- South Brother Island, India, in the Andaman Islands, Indian Ocean
- South Brother Island (Ounḏa Kômaytou), one of the Seven Brothers (islands) in Bab-El-Mandeb strait, Djibouti
- South Brother Island, one of the Rukan Islands in Indonesia
- South Brother Island, one of The Brothers in New Zealand

== See also ==
- Brother Island (disambiguation)
- North Brother Island (disambiguation)
