= North Brother Island =

North Brother Island may refer to:

- North Brother Island (Andaman and Nicobar Islands), in the Andaman Islands, Indian Ocean
- North Brother Island, Connecticut, US
- North and South Brother Islands (New York City), in New York, US
- North Brother (Chagos Bank), one of the Three Brothers islands in the Chagos Archipelago, British Indian Ocean Territory
- North Brother, one of the Rukan Islands in Indonesia
- North Brother Island, one of The Brothers islands in New Zealand

== See also ==
- Brother Island (disambiguation)
- South Brother Island (disambiguation)
