= Middle Brother Islet, Queensland =

Island in Queensland

Coordinates: 10.711318°S 142.680763°E

Middle (or Mid) Brother Islet is a small uninhabited island at the east entrance of the Adolphus Channel of the Torres Strait, in Queensland, Australia. It is located about 7 km south of Mount Adolphus Island, 7 km east of Albany Island, and 1.5 km west of the South Ledge Reef.

Middle Brother lies at the northwest edge of the Middle Brother Reef, halfway between the North Brother Rock (1.3 km to the northwest) and the South Brother Reef. It is about 80 m long by 50 m wide. As of 2011, the surrounding area was classified as a marine Habitat Protection Zone (number 10-323) by the Government of Queensland.

== See also ==
- Middle Brother Island, one of the Rukan Islands in Indonesia.
