= Musket Villa =

Historic house in Ascot, Queensland, Australia

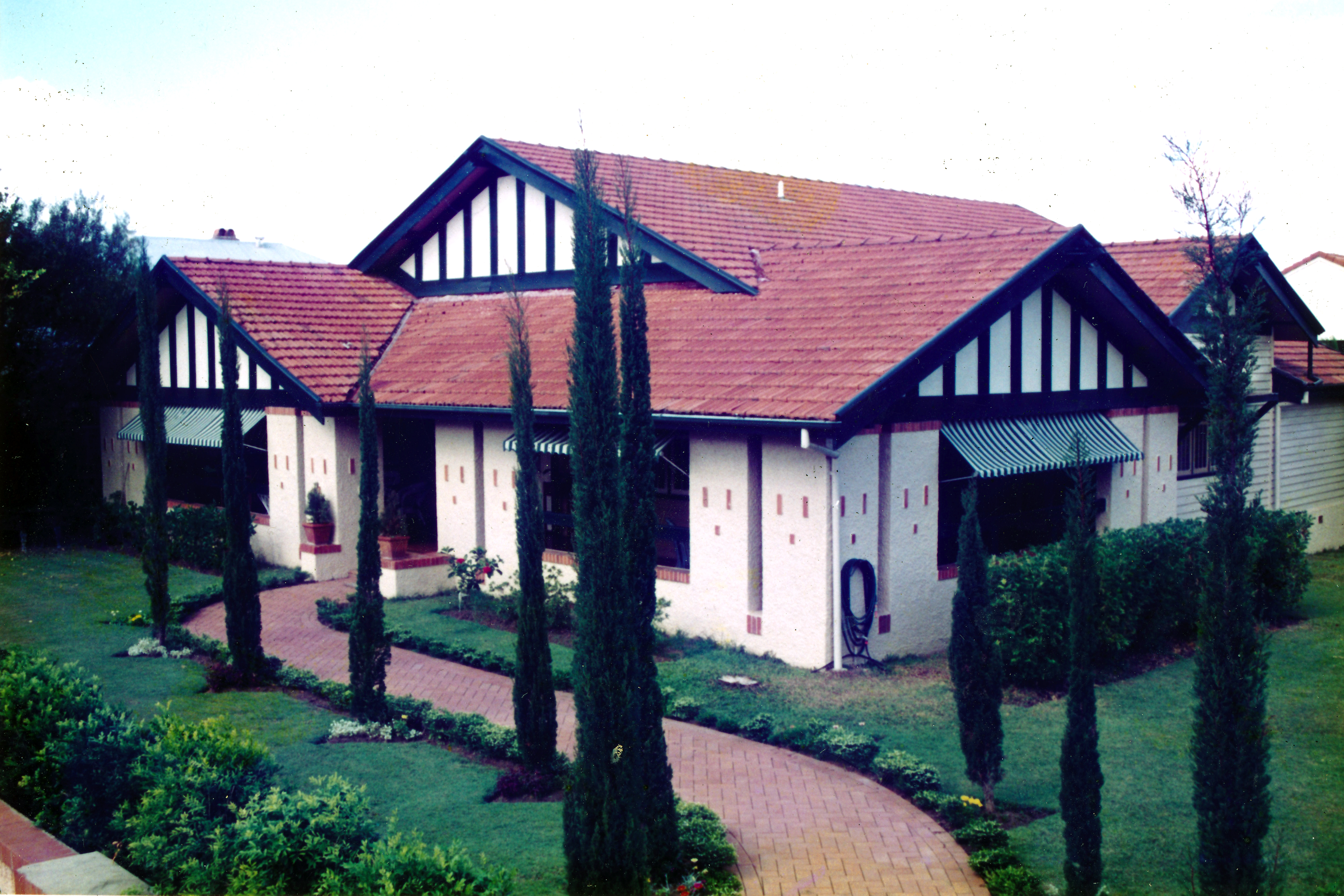
- The house is only partially visible from the street.

- Location within Queensland Location within Australia
- 27.4316°S 153.0668°E
- Location: 251 Lancaster Road, Ascot, Queensland, Australia

History
- Design period: 1919–1930s (interwar period)
- Built: 1923
- Built for: William "Billy" Booth

Site notes
- Architect: Hall and Prentice

Queensland Heritage Register
- Official name: Musket Villa, Lancaster Gables
- Type: state heritage (built, landscape)
- Designated: 28 July 2000
- Reference no.: 601741
- Significant period: 1920s (fabric, historical)
- Significant components: furniture/fittings, garden/grounds, lead light/s, gate – entrance, residential accommodation – main house, fence/wall – perimeter

Musket Villa is a heritage-listed detached house at 251 Lancaster Road, Ascot, Queensland, Australia. It was designed by architectural firm Hall and Prentice and was built in 1923. It is also known as Lancaster Gables. It was added to the Queensland Heritage Register on 28 July 2000.

== History ==
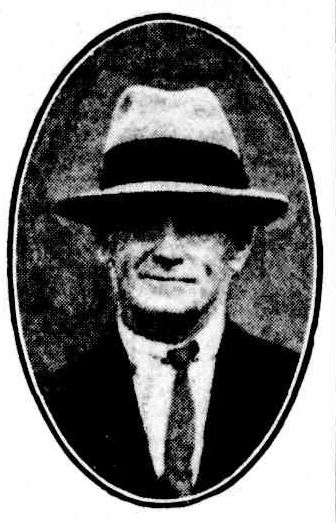
Billy Booth

Musket Villa, a single storey, stucco building, in the style known as a Californian bungalow and the adjoining stables were constructed in 1923 for well-known horse trainer and rider, William "Billy" Booth. Located opposite Eagle Farm Racecourse in Lancaster Road. Musket Villa was designed by prominent Brisbane architects Hall and Prentice and built by contractors Lee and Brickwood.

William Booth entered the horse training and racing industry in 1885 when he became an apprentice to John Stone, an early Brisbane horse trainer. During his nine years with Stone, Booth trained and rode many famous horses. His work included breaking-in Grey Gown and training Dundonald who went on to win the treble of St. Ledger, the Brisbane Cup and the Moreton Handicap in 1899.

Booth established his own training stables in 1893 and trained and rode horses for several prominent racing identities. He had up to twenty-one horses training at a time and among his successes was Bright Laddie who won the Brisbane 2000 and the Stradbroke Handicap. Booth was also known for his grey pony named Billy who won over 385 ribbons at the Brisbane Show.

In 1899 Booth trained and rode the winning horse, Musket, in the Queensland Turf Club Derby. Shortly after, he married Lucy Adelaide and named their newly constructed home on Racecourse Road Musket, in honour of the winning horse. Booth retired from riding following his marriage but continued to train horses.

The Booths purchased the land on which the existing Musket stands in 1922. They commissioned architects Hall and Prentice to design a house, stables, garage and sand shed in a similar architectural style. The complex, also named Musket, was completed in 1923 and received high praise in the 1924 publication "Harking Back – the Turf, Its Men and Memories". Through this publication, Booth credited his wife "not only for the idea of its architecture but also for the tastefulness of its general furnishing". The article described the house as a "red-tiled home with its beautiful gardens and lawns [and] every modern appointment and equipment."

The stables were designed to accommodate twelve horses and also included rooms, a shower, wash basin and ding room for employees. They were regarded as being amongst the most "up-to-date stables...to be found in Australia", with Booth paying the "fullest attention to the comfort of his employees and his equine charges".

The architectural firm of Hall and Prentice was established in 1919 with the partnership of Thomas Ramsay Hall and George Gray Prentice. Hall was one of Brisbane's "most successful architects of the early twentieth century" and the firm designed many prestigious buildings in Brisbane, including Brisbane City Hall, Sandgate Town Hall, and the Tattersalls Club. He was involved in racing through Tattersall's and the Queensland Turf clubs, his name is commemorated in the T.R. Hall Handicap.

In 1927, William Booth died at the age of 54, leaving Musket to his wife. His death was mourned by the Queensland racing fraternity, members of the Queensland Turf Club, the Tattersall's Club, and the Queensland Breeders, Owners and Traders Association. Following Booth's death, the stables were leased to William James Shean until c. 1941 when they were converted into four two bedroom flats by Lucy Booth who continued to live in the villa. Lucy Booth died in 1958, leaving Musket to her surviving son, Norman, who lived in the house until his death in 1955.

== Description ==
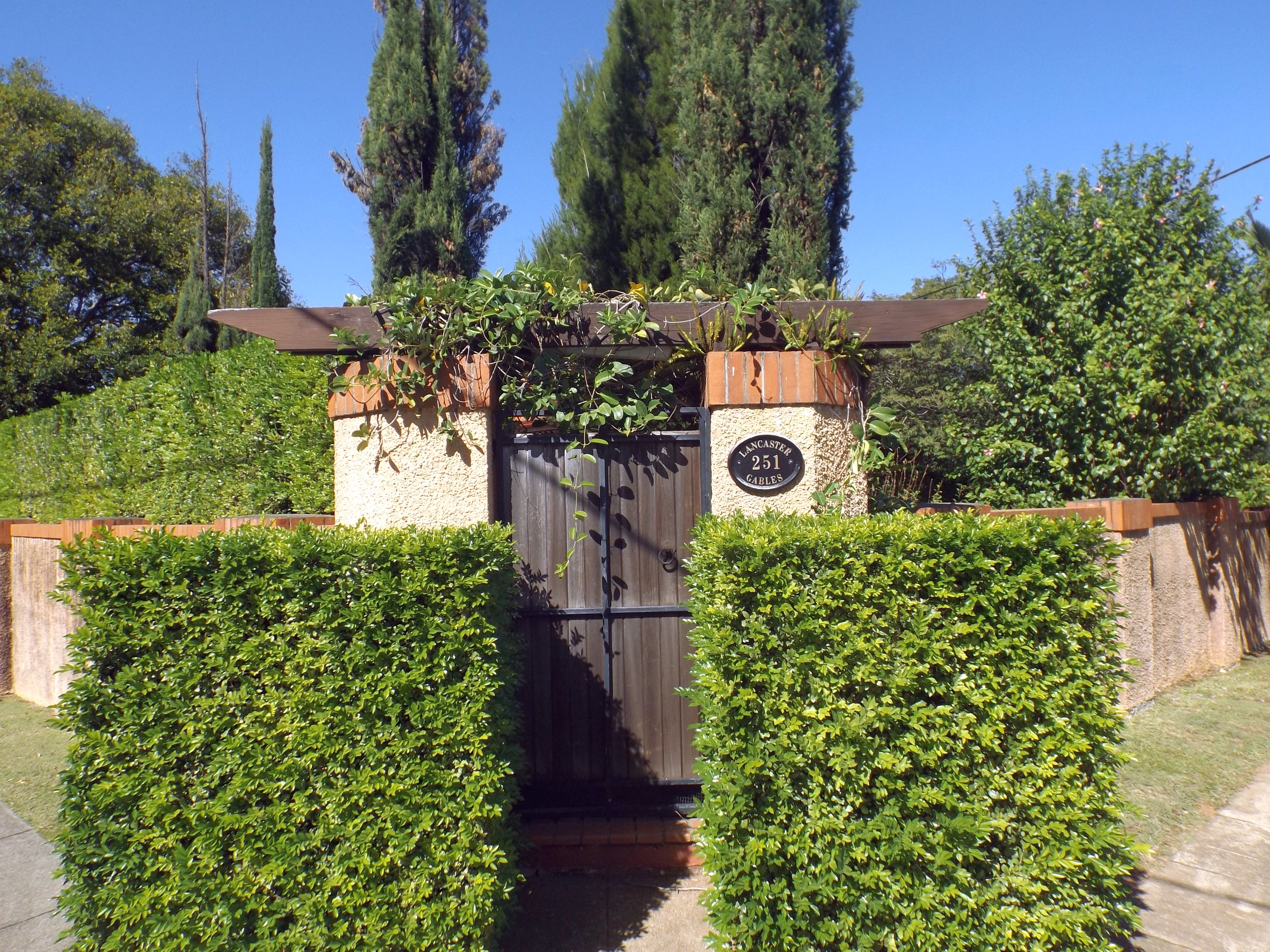
Entrance, 2015

Musket Villa, a substantial, multi-gabled residence constructed of timber and rendered masonry in the interwar Californian bungalow style, is located opposite the Eagle Farm Racecourse. It is surrounded by houses and flats of varying ages and styles.

The house is surrounded by a high, rough-rendered, brick wall and is accessed by a timber gate located on the corner of the property. A newly paved path follows the line of the original concrete path, and new plantings surround the residence.

The residence is primarily constructed of timber with a terracotta tiled roof of Marseilles tiles. A wide verandah with Crow's Ash flooring and a substantial rendered brick and timber balustrade is located across the front elevation and returns halfway around both side elevations. Pairs of rectangular rendered brick piers with red brick detailing are located on either side of the central entrance and at each corner of the verandah. The structure is slightly raised on rendered brick posts and is accessed via two steps that lead onto the verandah.

The front and side elevations have multiple gables with strapwork detail to the gable ends. Windows throughout are timber casements, each of which have three bands of coloured glass in the uppermost section.

Internally, the house has a wide, centrally located entry hall that opens onto a large combined living and dining room. Two main Bedrooms open from either side of the hallway, both feature en-suites and five-sided corner bay windows. A secondary hall runs at the rear of the living/dining room, with additional bedrooms opening from it. The kitchen is located on the eastern side of the house, not in its original location.

Many original features survive throughout the residence, including ebonised timber detailing (commonly called Black Japan), leadlight doors, built-in leadlight display cabinets in the living/dining room and entry hall, and timber panelling in the entry.

== Heritage listing ==
Musket Villa was listed on the Queensland Heritage Register on 28 July 2000, having satisfied the following criteria.

The place is important in demonstrating the evolution or pattern of Queensland's history.

Musket Villa is important because of its aesthetic and architectural significance. Designed by prominent Brisbane architects Hall and Prentice in 1923, Musket is an important example of a well-composed and skilfully detailed interwar bungalow. The residence retains many original features such as interior timber panelling, leadlight doors and built-in display cabinets, timber windows, light fittings and ebonised timber detailing. These and other features, such as the use of materials like terracotta roof tiles and rendered masonry, demonstrate the key features and principal characteristics of substantial interwar bungalows.

Musket Villa has social significance to the Queensland racing industry, being an example of a purpose-built stables, training establishment and residence, located in the hub of the racing district of Brisbane. Musket Villa has a special association with racing identity, trainer and jockey, William "Billy" Booth, for whom it was constructed, and with Brisbane architects Hall and Prentice as an example of their domestic work.

The place is important in demonstrating the principal characteristics of a particular class of cultural places.

Designed by prominent Brisbane architects Hall and Prentice in 1923, Musket is an important example of a well-composed and skilfully detailed interwar bungalow. The residence retains many original features such as interior timber panelling, leadlight doors and built-in display cabinets, timber windows, light fittings and ebonised timber detailing. These and other features, such as the use of materials like terracotta roof tiles and rendered masonry, demonstrate the key features and principal characteristics of substantial interwar bungalows.

The place is important because of its aesthetic significance.

Musket Villa is important because of its aesthetic and architectural significance.

The place has a strong or special association with a particular community or cultural group for social, cultural or spiritual reasons.

Musket Villa has social significance to the Queensland racing industry, being an example of a horse trainer's residence which had associated stables and ancillary facilities located in the hub of the racing district of Brisbane.

The place has a special association with the life or work of a particular person, group or organisation of importance in Queensland's history.

Musket Villa has a special association with racing identity, trainer and jockey, William "Billy" Booth, for whom it was constructed, and with Brisbane architects Hall and Prentice as an example of their domestic work.
