= George Gray Prentice =

George Gray Prentice (25 July 1891 – July 1944) was an architect practising in Brisbane, Australia, during the first half of the twentieth century and was involved in the design and construction of numerous major buildings in South East Queensland including the Queensland Heritage Register listed Brisbane City Hall.

== Life ==
G. G. Prentice was born on 25 July 1891 in Tank Street, Brisbane, Queensland and was the son of George Prentice, first mayor of Sandgate and director of the Brisbane Permanent Building and Banking Company, and his second wife Jean Elizabeth, née Gray, daughter of a pioneering boot retailer Messrs. T. and W. Gray's in George Street, Brisbane. George's half-sister, Jessie Blanche (aged 18), and paternal grandfather, George Prentice (aged 70), died the year before his birth when the RMS Quetta was wrecked on the Far North Queensland coast in 1890.

He attended the Normal School in Brisbane, and was an employee in the artist's department of Watson, Ferguson and Company, established in 1868 and Queensland's longest operating printing company. On 24 November 1915 he married Ethel Driver at St Nicholas's Church, Sandgate. They had one son, Dr Peter George Driver, who served with the Royal Australian Air Force during World War II and was the father of Ian Prentice.

George Gray Prentice was articled to the architect Thomas Ramsay Hall and, in the early 1900s, the two men entered into partnership and established the firm Hall and Prentice. In 1931 George Gray Prentice entered into partnership with William 'Bill' Atkinson, son of the architect H. W. Atkinson, to form Atkinson Prentice. In 1939, George Grey Prentice filed for bankruptcy due to a combination of ill health, unprofitable investments and the impact of the Depression on his business. In the years immediately prior to his death, he worked for the Department of the Interior.

Throughout his career, George Gray Prentice was involved with a number of significant buildings in Queensland including the Brisbane City Hall, Mater Misericordiae Public Children's Hospital, Nudgee College, All Hallows' Chapel, Our Lady of Victories Memorial Church, Truth Building, Ascot Chambers and the Sandgate Cenotaph.

He was a life trustee and president of the Royal Queensland Art Society and a member of Tattersalls Club, Royal Queensland Golf Club, Brisbane Golf Club, Sandgate Golf Club, Sandgate Sailing Club and the Gordon Club.

George Gray Prentice died at the age of 53 in July 1944.

Some of the projects associated with Prentice

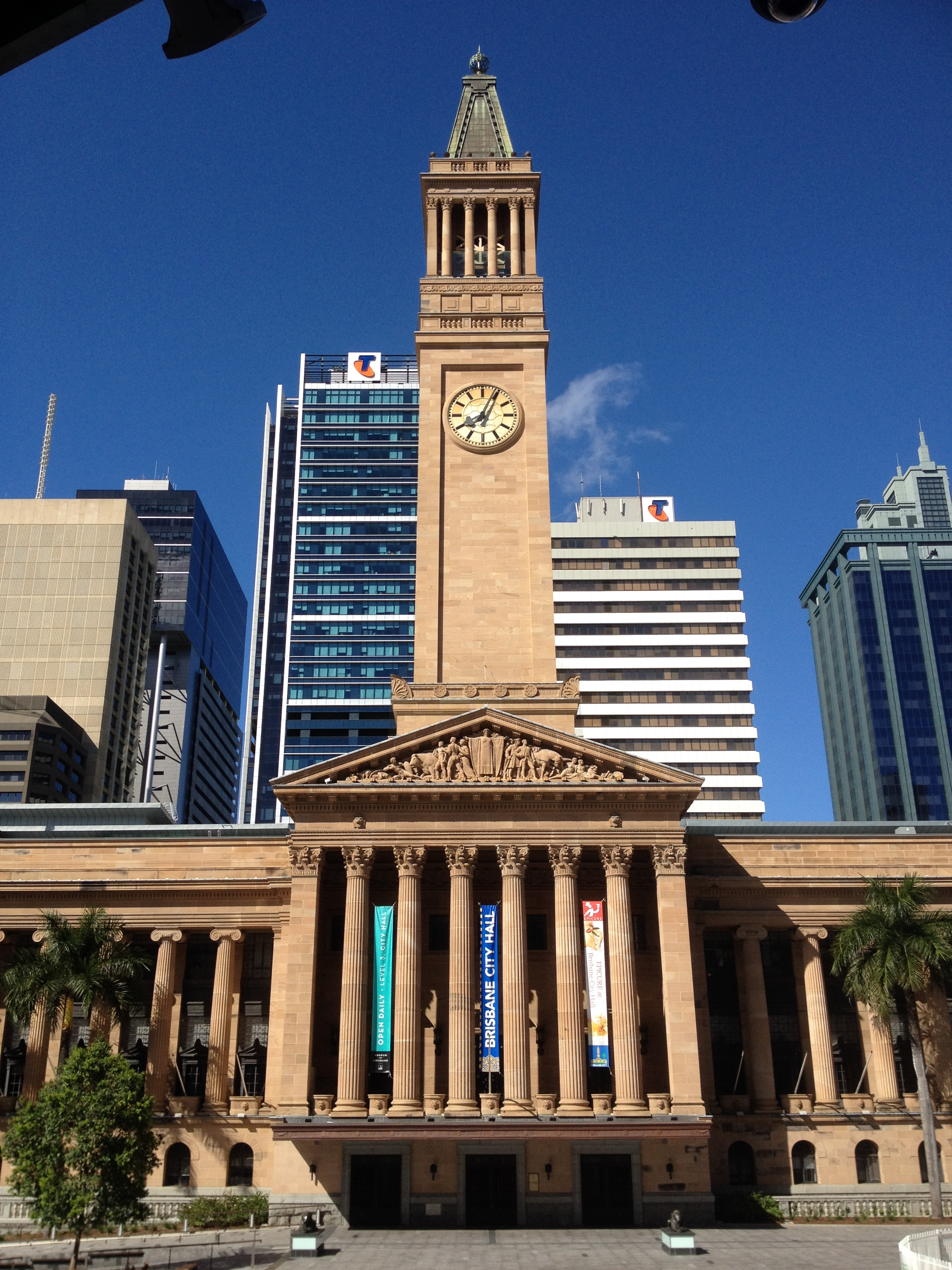
Brisbane City Hall

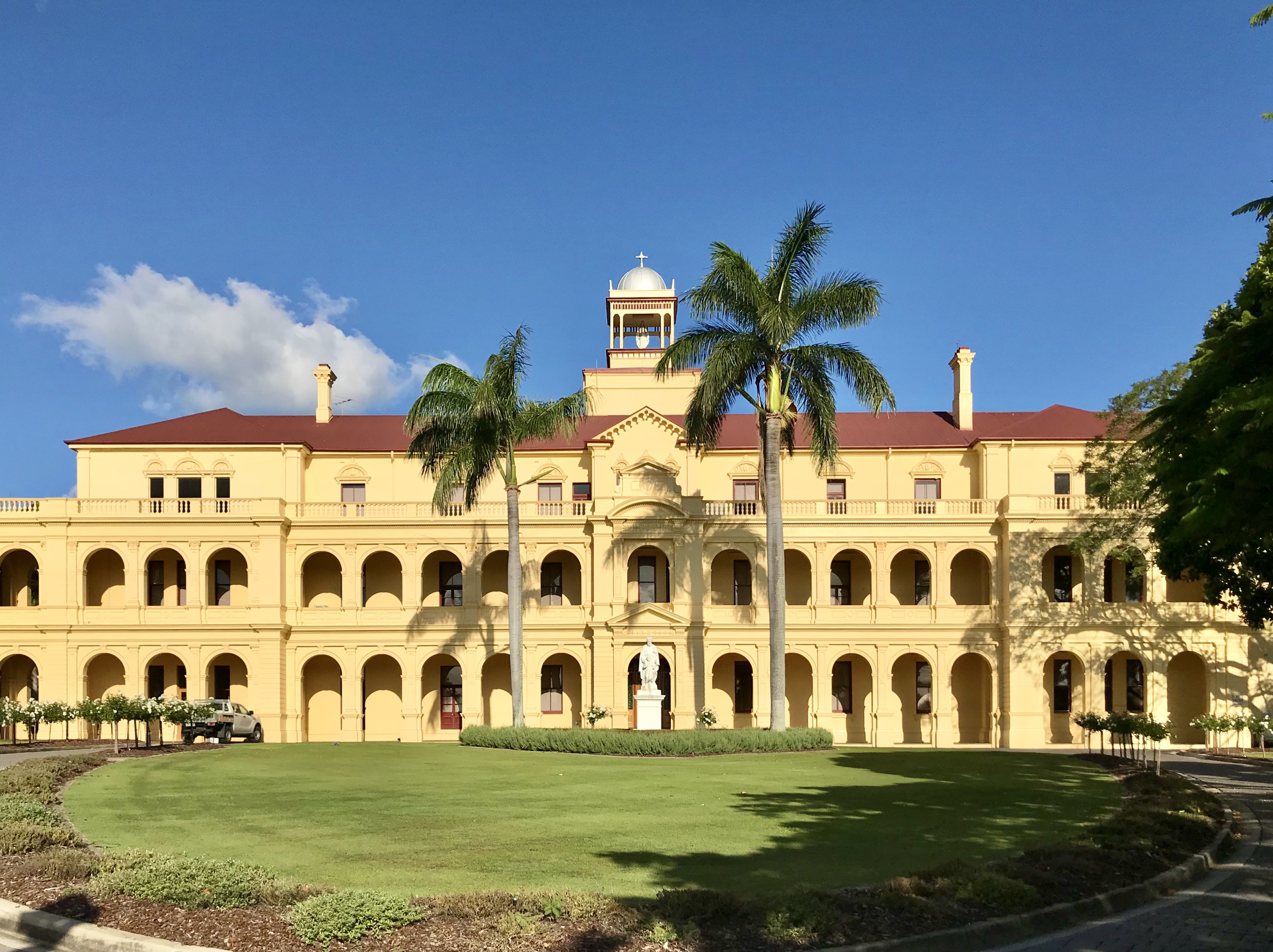
St Joseph's College, Nudgee
