= RMS Quetta =

British ocean liner wrecked in the Torres Strait

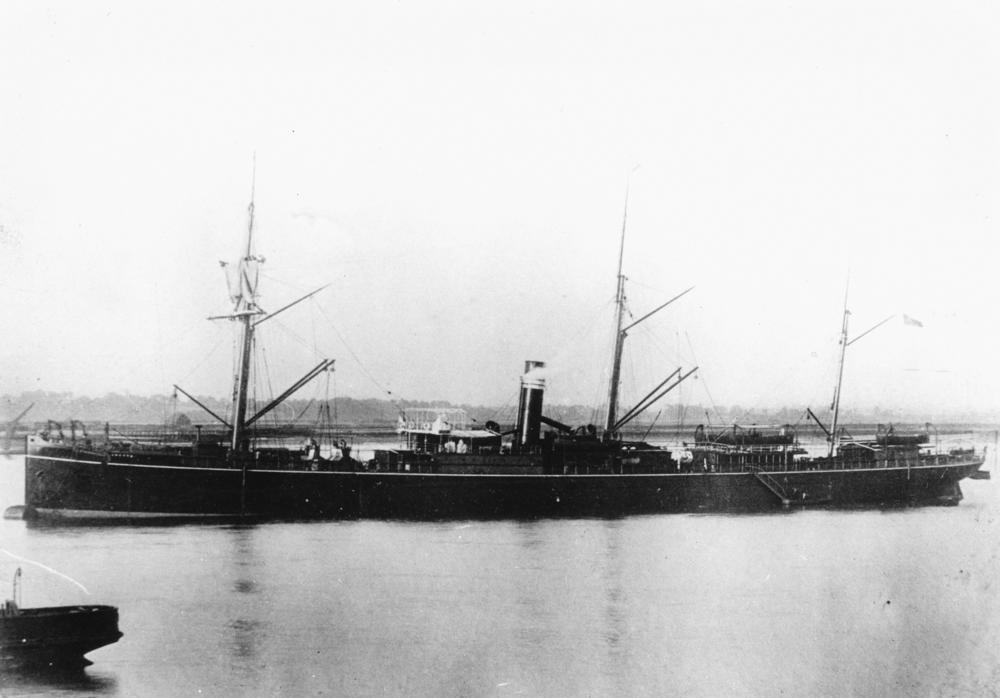
- Quetta at Gravesend in 1884

History

United Kingdom
- Name: Quetta
- Namesake: Quetta
- Owner: 1882: Gray, Dawes & Co; 1886: BI Associated Steamers
- Operator: British India Associated Steamers
- Port of registry: Glasgow
- Route: 1881: London – Suez – Calcutta; 1883: London – Suez – Brisbane
- Builder: Wm Denny & Bros, Dumbarton
- Cost: £70,119
- Yard number: 243
- Launched: 1 March 1881
- Completed: 18 May 1881
- Identification: UK official number 84309; code letters VMNG
- Fate: Wrecked 1890

General characteristics
- Type: cargo liner
- Tonnage: 3,484 GRT, 2,254 NRT
- Length: 380.0 ft (115.8 m)
- Beam: 40.3 ft (12.3 m)
- Depth: 29.0 ft (8.8 m)
- Decks: 3
- Installed power: 500 HP
- Propulsion: 1 × compound engine; 1 × screw
- Sail plan: 3-masted barquentine
- Speed: 12 knots (22 km/h)
- Capacity: cargo: 148,253 cubic feet (4,198 m^{3}); passengers: 76 × 1st class, 32 × 2nd class, plus steerage
- Crew: 121
- Notes: hydraulic cargo handling equipment

RMS Quetta was an iron-hulled 3-masted steamship that was built in Scotland in 1881 and wrecked with great loss of life in the Torres Strait in 1890. She was operated by British India Associated Steamers (BIAS), which was controlled by the British India Steam Navigation Company (BISN). She was wrecked on a previously unknown rock, which has been called Quetta Rock ever since. The Underwater Cultural Heritage Act 2018 protects the wreck.

== Building ==
William Denny and Brothers built Quetta for £70,119 at Dumbarton on the River Leven as yard number 243. She was launched on 1 March 1881 and completed on 18 May. Her registered length was 380.0 ft (115.8 m), her beam was 40.3 ft (12.3 m) and her depth was 29.0 ft (8.8 m). Her tonnages were 3,484 GRT and 2,254 NRT. She originally had berths for 76 passengers in first class and 32 in second class travelling between England and India, but was later modified to accommodate the increasing number of migrants bound for Australia in steerage.The steam engine and two 500-ton coal bunkers were amidship.

According to shipwreck historian Max Jeffrys, Quetta was ‘fitted out with all the comforts of her class at the time’. After her refit, first class cabins were on the upper deck, next to an elegantly appointed dining, music and smoking rooms. The captain’s cabin and open navigation bridge were perched above. The steerage accommodation was on the main deck, under the ‘tween deck luggage and cargo storage. There was no third class on Quetta, apart from temporary shelters erected when needed at the stern of the upper deck for Javanese labourers returning to Batavia from the Queensland canefields.

Quetta had a single screw, driven by a two-cylinder compound engine built by Denny. It was rated at 500 HP and gave her a speed of 12 knots (22 km/h). The ship had three masts, and was rigged as a barquentine. She also had a hydraulic system to drive the cargo winches, steering gear and anchors, as well as electric lighting and refrigerated storage for meat and dairy exports from Queensland.

Denny built Quetta for Gray, Dawes and Company, who since 1865 had been BISN's London agents. They registered her in Glasgow. Her United Kingdom official number was 84309 and her code letters were VMNG. She had a black hull with a slender white line tracing the main deck level. Her black funnel with two thick white bands were distinctive markers of her owner, British India Associated Services (BIAS).

== British India Associated Services ==
In 1876 BISN created BIAS to run a scheduled service between London and Calcutta via Gibraltar, the Suez Canal, Colombo, and Madras (now Chennai). BIAS managed the ships, but one or more private shareholders owned each ship. Quetta worked the London – Calcutta route for the first two years of her career.

Quetta was one of a series of three-masted brigantines that Denny built for BIAS. Denny completed India in November 1881. She was similar to Quetta, but about 10 feet (3 m) longer, 2 feet (0.6 m) greater beam, and built of steel instead of iron. India was the first ship in the BISN group to have electric light. Denny completed Goorkha, a sister ship for India, in May 1882. Then in April 1884 Denny completed Manora, which at 410 feet (120 m) long and 45.2 feet (13.8 m) beam was larger still.

== Queensland Royal Mail route ==
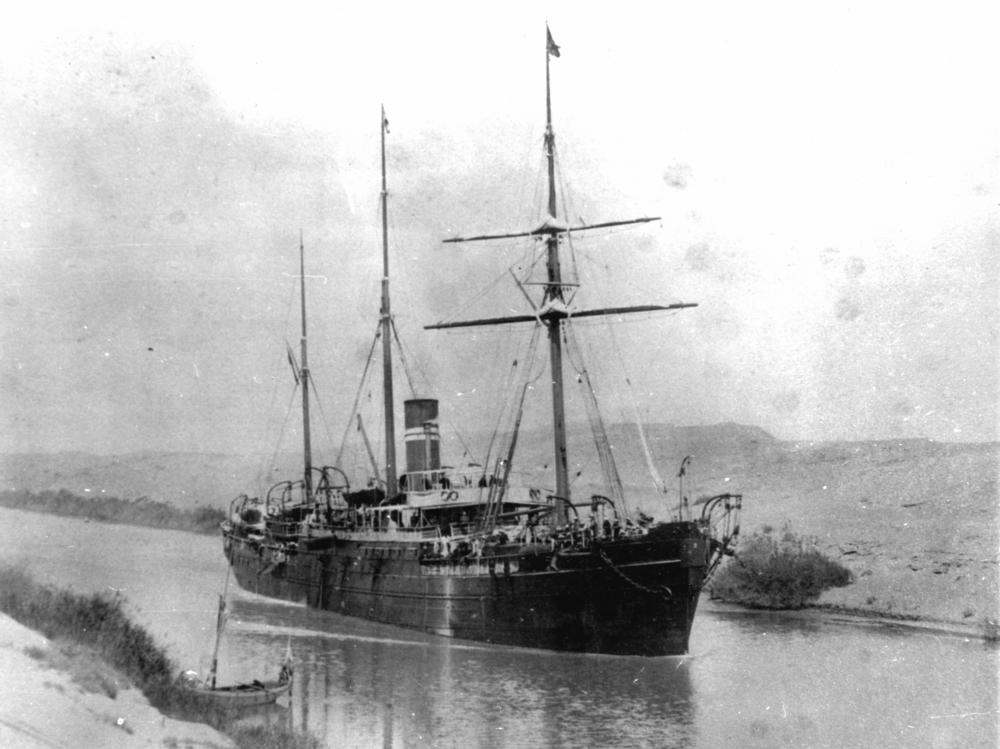
Quetta in the Suez Canal, date unknown

Mail and passenger ships between Britain and Australia mostly served a route via Australia's south coast, calling at either Fremantle or Albany, Adelaide, Melbourne, and Sydney. Not all ships continued up the east coast to Brisbane. The Colony of Queensland thus had a passenger and mail link with Britain that was less direct and less frequent than the other Australian colonies enjoyed.

In 1881 Thomas McIlwraith, Premier of Queensland obtained parliamentary authority for to offer a mail contract for a shipping company to run a service between London and Brisbane via the Suez Canal and the Torres Strait. BIAS won the contract, and formed the Queensland Steam Ship Company to run feeder routes to connect with it.

In 1883 BIAS doubled the frequency of its London – Brisbane service. For this it chartered six ships, and also transferred Quetta to the route. On 8 April that year Quetta left London on her first voyage to Brisbane. She called at Plymouth, Port Said, Aden, and Batavia (now Jakarta). On 29 May she reached Cooktown in North Queensland. She continued down Queensland's east coast, calling at Cleveland Bay (for Townsville), Bowen, and Keppel Bay (for Rockhampton).

At Cleveland Bay she disembarked 67 migrants for Townsville, and at Keppel Bay she disembarked 115 migrants to a steam launch, which landed them at Rockhampton. She steamed from Keppel Bay to Cape Moreton in 24 hours, setting what was then a record, and arrived off Brisbane on 5 June.

By 1886 ownership of Quetta had been transferred from Gray, Dawes & Co to BIAS. By 1890 she had made 11 round trips between London and Brisbane.

== Loss ==
On 18 February 1890 Quetta left Brisbane for London. Along the Queensland coast she called at Townsville, Cairns, Kimberley, and Cooktown. She was due to call at Batavia, Singapore, and Colombo. On departing Cooktown on Thursday 27 February Quetta carried a total of 293 persons (passengers and crew) and live sheep in deck pens. In addition to mail bags, the cargo comprised 2278 bales of wool, 4260 cases of meat and tallow, and 60 tons of metals with an insurance value of more than £50,000.

Quetta's Master was Captain Alfred Sanders. Her ship's company comprised 28 European officers and ratings and 93 lascars. After leaving Cooktown she carried 171 passengers: 33 first or second class, 65 steerage, and 62 Javanese labourers, who were returning to Batavia as deck passengers from working on sugar cane plantations.

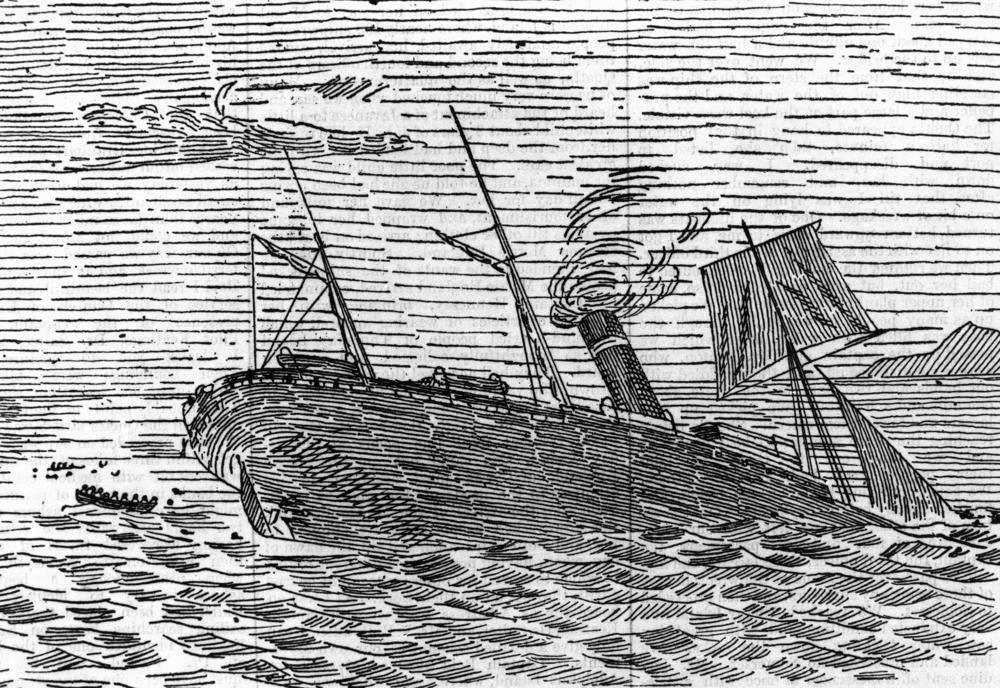
An artist's impression of Quetta sinking, published in The Queenslander

Quetta embarked an experienced pilot, Captain Eldred P. Keatinge, to command her through the Torres Strait. She turned into the Adolphus Channel to round the Cape York Peninsula. The pilot was experienced, the weather fine and visibility good, but at 21:14 hrs she struck an uncharted rock in the middle of the channel near Albany Island. Captain Keating estimated the rock's position to be 10°40′10″S 142°38′10″E. It split open the steel plates of her hull from her bow to her engine room. She settled by her bow, listed to port, raised her stern out of the water, and then sank, all within three minutes.

Quetta's cutter floated clear but capsized, surrounded by a large group of Javanese and lascars. Quartermaster James Oates organised the baling of the cutter and steered it ashore. Her Number 1 (starboard) lifeboat floated free, but was damaged and capsized. Captain Keating and the Third Officer Thomas Babb, righted it, but were unable to bale it out. It picked up more survivors, including Captain Sanders. The two boats met, and landed their survivors on Mount Adolphus Island.

The Quetta wrecking is considered to be ‘worst single-incident disaster in Queensland history’. A full list of passengers and crew indicating who died or were saved can be viewed at John Oxley Library, State Library of Queensland in Brisbane.

== Survivors ==
People aboard at time of the sinking
Group	No. aboard	Survival rate
Javanese passengers	70	79%
Lascar ratings	92	78%
Saloon passengers	26	19%
Steerage passengers	75	86%
European officers	15	
European ratings	14	
Total	292	54%

Captain Keating led a party to Somerset on the Cape York Peninsula. A Somerset resident, Frank Jardine, organised a rescue with his own boats, and sent messengers to the nearest telegraph station, 15 miles (24 km) away, to summon steamers from Thursday Island. Jardine also provided one of Quetta's boats with food and water for the survivors. The boat then made for Mount Adolphus Island. Later the boat stopped the steamship Victoria, to which Captains Keating and Sanders and some lascars transferred. One of Jardine's boats was already at sea, having been catching turtles, and was on its way back to Somerset. It encountered wreckage, from which its crew rescued ten survivors.

The telegram reached Thursday Island about 14:00 hrs on 1 March. The government resident, John Douglas, sent the steamer Albatross from Port Kennedy. Another captain volunteered to take his steamer, Merrie England, as well. After about three hours Albatross met Victoria, from which it took off Captains Keating and Sanders and the lascars. Albatross continued to Mount Adolphus Island, whence she picked up nearly 100 survivors, including the second and fourth officers.

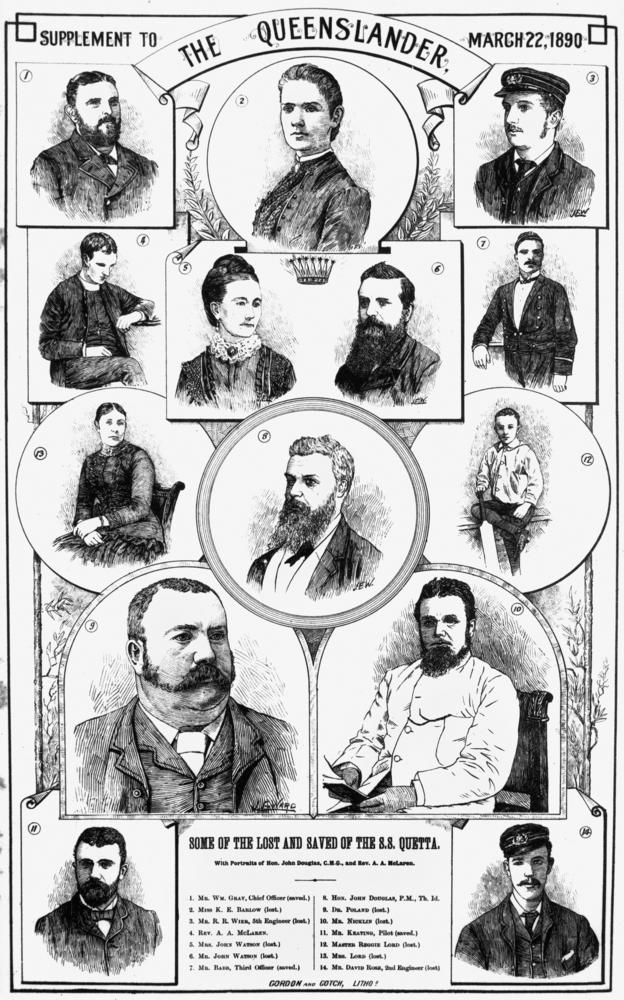
An illustration for The Queenslander representing some of Quetta's lost and saved

Just before Quetta hit the rock, two teenagers, May Lacy and Alice Elizabeth Nicklin, had been on deck. They were separated in the sinking, but Nicklin was a strong swimmer and clung to flotsam: first a hatch cover, then a dead sheep, and finally a plank. The survivors in the boats could hear her calling, but it was too dark to see her as the moon had set. Nicklin kept hold of the plank, alternately swimming and falling asleep, until dawn, when she swam still aided by the plank to an islet (now known as Nicklin Island, just north of Mount Adolphus Island). When she neared the islet, a lascar cabin boy called Alick, who had already reached the island, helped her ashore. Later one of the vessels searching for survivors found the pair and took them to Somerset.

May Lacy did not survive. However, Albatross found her elder sister Emily, still swimming in the sea 36 hours after the sinking.

One other survivor was a toddler who did not know her own name. The only words she said were "Mama", "Jimmsy" and "Willie". About 30 children had been aboard Quetta, and her manifest listed more than one family with boys called James and William. One was that of a widow, Mary Copeland from Maryborough, who had a young daughter also called Mary. Mrs Copeland and her three children were returning to Britain after her husband, a stockman, had drowned in a separate accident.

The toddler was photographed, and a print of the photograph was sent to a family in Scotland believed to be her relatives, but the family replied that they did not recognise her. One of the Torres Straits pilots, Captain Edmund Brown, adopted her, naming her Cecil Quetta Brown, nicknamed "Cissy". A year or two later Captain Brown died, so his brother Villiers Brown raised "Cissy" in Brisbane. In 1927 it was confirmed that "Cissy" was in fact Mary Copeland.

After rescuing survivors, Albatross took soundings and found the rock thought to have caused the disaster, about 1/2 nautical mile (1 km) from Quetta's wreck.

== Notable passengers ==
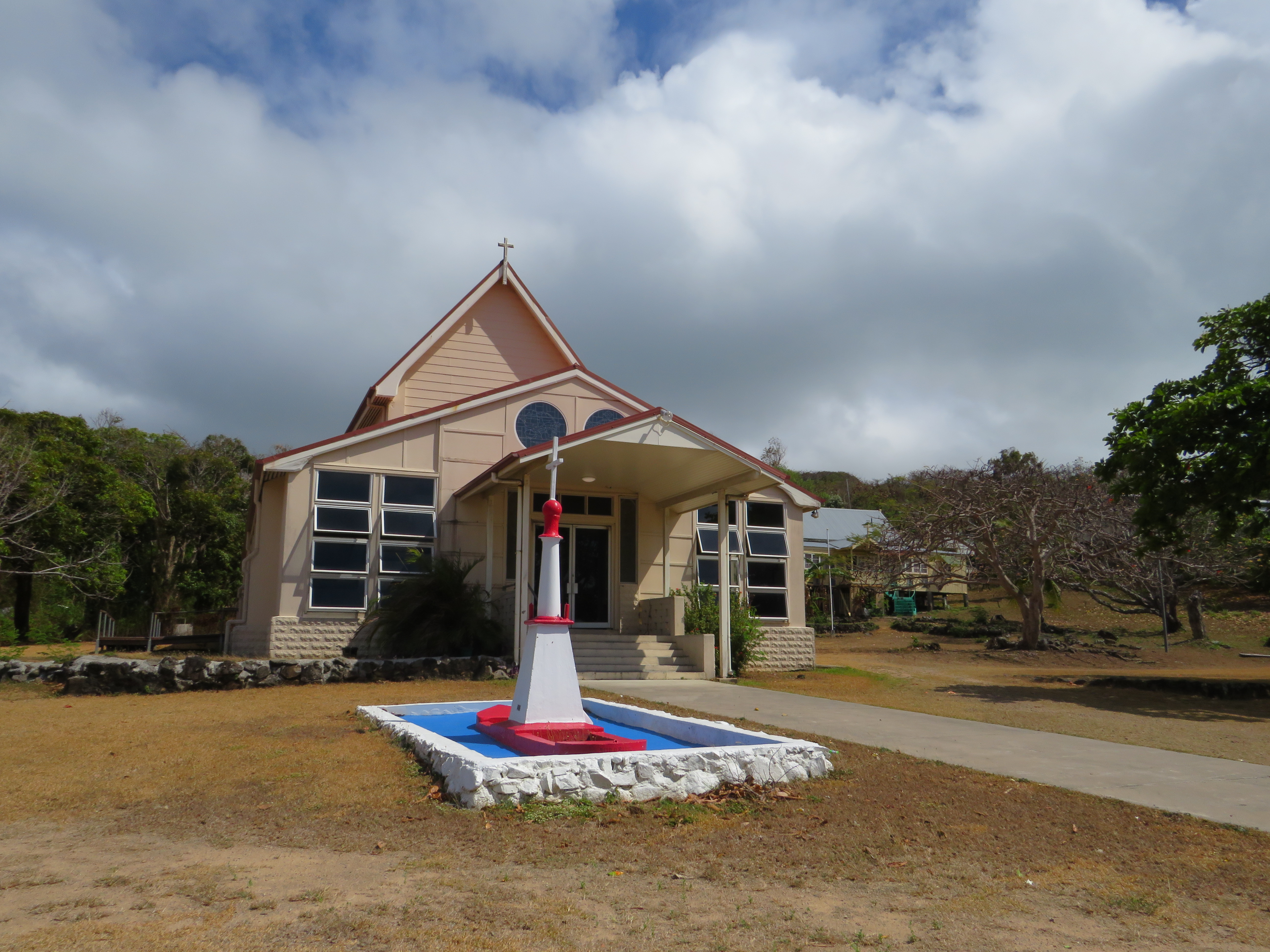
The memorial cathedral, with a monument to Quetta in the foreground

- Alexander Archer, manager of the Bank of New South Wales in Brisbane, brother of Archibald Archer, and wife, Mary Louisa (Minnie), a daughter of Sir Robert Mackenzie, 10th Baronet, both died.
- Cecil Quetta Brown, formerly Mary Copeland (see above), survived. A documentary film about her was released in 2021.
- Reuben Nicklin, and wife, Jane Lahey Nicklin, paternal grandparents of future Premier of Queensland Frank Nicklin both died. Jane Lahey Nicklin was the daughter of the prosperous timber merchant Francis Lahey and her brothers formed Lahey's Canungra Sawmill. The Nicklin family home "Hatherton" became the Queen Alexandra Home. Their daughter Alice Elizabeth Nicklin (19) was one of the few female survivors (see above).
- Dr Henry Poland was Quetta's surgeon. He is the only victim whose body is buried on Thursday Island.
- George (70) and Jessie Blanche Prentice (18), paternal grandfather and half-sister of George Gray Prentice, both died.
- John Watson of Watson, Ferguson and Company, and wife, Elizabeth Selim Watson, both died.
- Claudius Buchanan Whish, and wife, Anne Ker Whish, both died.

While most of the above-named people were travelling in saloon (or first) class, less is known about the steerage passengers, many of whom like William Henry Moore (1864-1890) perished in the Quetta wreck. Moore embarked the Quetta in February 1890 intending to visit his family in Birmingham, England after almost 5 years in the Colony of Queensland. During this time he wrote 25 letters to family membersdocumenting his experiences here as an unassisted migrant. In addition to illustrating opportunities and socio-economic challenges of late C19 Queensland, these letters throw light on life aboard a migrant ship in the early days of steam, and add further demographic insight to the history of the Quetta's final voyage.

William Moore's first two letters describe his outward voyage to Australia in 1885 as a steerage passenger aboard RMS Iberia, his arrival in Sydney, and his onward passage to Brisbane by coastal steamer. The subsequent letters recount his travels of about 6000 km through the bush, mostly on foot and horseback, in search of work, and the 14 different jobs he undertook including as fencer, camp cook and steam engine operator. Moore's manuscript letters are held at the Fryer Library, University of Queensland Library.

== Marine Board inquiry ==
In April 1890 the Queensland Marine Board inquiry found that the Quetta shipwreck was purely accidental, noting that the damaging rock was not shown on Admiralty charts. It reported that the starboard side had been ripped ‘from right forward as far aft to the engine room’, and the ship had foundered so rapidly that nothing could have been done to save her. According to the Board, Quetta had been well equipped with 8 life buoys and over 600 life belts. Captain Sanders and pilot Captain Keatinge were exonerated: the former had ‘exerted himself to the utmost’ and the latter had been ‘very careful and attentive to the navigation of the ship’ in steering the Admiralty’s recommended course. The crew members were apparently well disciplined and had responded quickly to orders during the emergency. The Board commended Frank Jardine for his rescue effort. It also recommended that steamships should be equipped with speaking tubes between the bridge and the engine room to lessen the need for sending messengers back and forth.

== Wreck, monument and artefacts ==
The wreck lies on its port side in 18 metres (59 ft) of water and is protected by the Underwater Cultural Heritage Act 2018.

Quetta Memorial Precinct on Thursday Island is a monument to the 134 lives lost in the disaster. Building started in 1892 and the church was consecrated in 1893. It comprises an Anglican church, rectory, and church hall. The church is now a cathedral, and the rectory is the bishop's house. Artefacts recovered during salvage attempts after the disaster, and since, are now in the church. These include one of Quetta’s portholes, a lifebelt, a photo of the ship and a copy of Queensland Marine Board’s report. A saloon table from the Quetta serves as an altar. Plaques and stained-glass windows commemorate the victims and draw attention to the human impacts of a shipwreck. In 2021 the St Bartholomew’s Church community held a commemorative service on the 141st anniversary of the Quetta shipwreck.

Beyond Thursday Island, other Quetta artefacts can be viewed, including: the ship’s bell, which for many years hung outside St Bartholomew’s Church, is now in the Cooktown Museum; the brass binnacle is exhibited at the Commissariat Store Museum, Brisbane (Royal Historical Society of Queensland); a sketch of Quetta Brown (child survivor) in a frame she carved is displayed at Miegunya House Museum, Brisbane (Queensland Women’s Historical Association); and a wooden chest is held at Wolston Park Farmhouse (National Trust of Queensland); several photos of the Quetta at John Oxley Library, State Library of Queensland; and works by renowned colonial artist Isaac Walter Jenner at Queensland Gallery of Modern Art. Memorial plaques hang in churches in Brisbane and Toowoomba (Australia) and Tooting (England). St Thomas Church, Aslockton (England), built in memory of passenger Rev. Thomas Hall, features a striking stained-glass window that depicts Quetta and the Thursday Island church.

To mark the shipwreck centenary in 1990, Year 12 students at Thursday Island School retold the story in an imaginative yet factually based booklet entitled The Sinking of the Quetta with each student adopting the perspective of a particular survivor. The picture book Quetta by Gary Crew and Bruce Whatley offers a fictional account of the child Cecil Quetta Brown's rescue from the shipwreck and contested adoption.

== Dive site ==
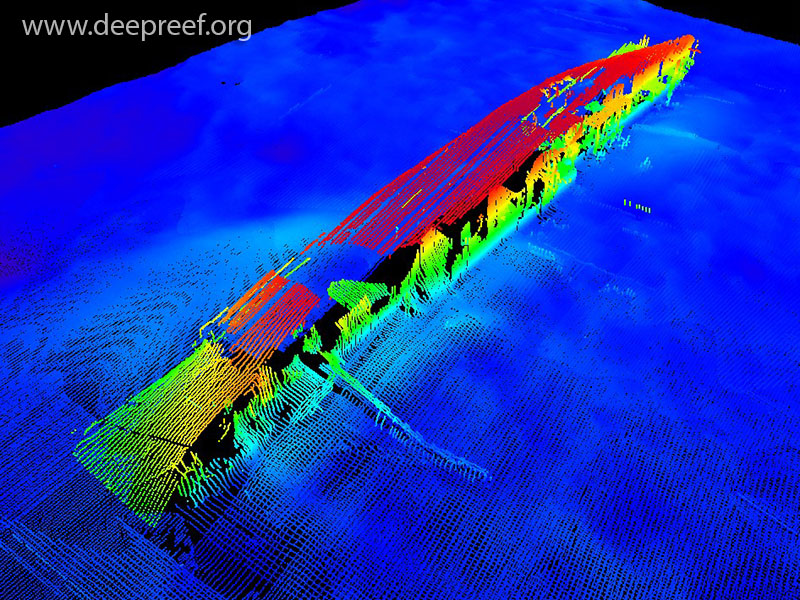
Underwater image of the Quetta wreck.

The wreck is now a popular if challenging diver site. Over time the hull has become coral encrusted and a flourishing ecosystem. The hull was still largely intact in 2013 when Ben Cropp, marine conservationist and shipwreck diver, found it lying on the port side pointing east (orientation 270/090 degrees). More recently dive master Matt Testoni reported: ‘Due to its location, the Quetta is overflowing with amazing marine life, all of which seems to be huge.' A recent sonar 3D image (right) shows Quetta's current physical state.

== Bibliography ==
- Blake, George (1956). B.I. Centenary 1856–1956. London: Collins.
- Foley, John CH (1990). The Quetta: Queensland's worst disaster. Aspley: Nairana Publications. ISBN 073168141X.
- Haws, Duncan (1987). British India S.N. Co. Merchant Fleets. Vol. 11. Burwash: Travel Creatours Ltd Publications. ISBN 0-946378-07-X.
- Hofer, Hubert (2004). The Wreck of the SS Quetta. Atherton: Northpic.
- Jeffreys, Max (1999). Murder, Mayhem Fire and Storm: Australian Shipwrecks. New Holland Publishers. pp. 163–175. ISBN 1-86436-445-9.
- Lloyd's Register of British & Foreign Shipping. London: Lloyd's Register of British & Foreign Shipping. 1882 – via Internet Archive.
- "A Maritime History of Torres Strait". Sportdiving in Australia & New Zealand (43). 1994.
- Mercantile Navy List. London: Crew List Index Project. 1882.
- "Miss Nicklin". Australian Town and Country Journal. Sydney. 15 March 1890. p. 34 – via Trove.
- Randall, Brian (30 July 2012). "The tragic tale of the Quetta, includes a picture of the Quetta". Torres News. Thursday Island. p. 10 – via Trove.
- Synge, Frances M. "VII. The Wreck of the S.S. Quetta". Albert Maclaren: Pioneer Missionary in New Guinea (A Memoir). London: USPG – via Project Canterbury.
- Universal Register. London: Lloyd's Register of British & Foreign Shipping. 1886 – via Internet Archive.
- "The wreck of the Quetta". South Australian Register. Adelaide. 5 March 1890. p. 5 – via Trove.
