= First Brother Island =

Island in West Virginia

- Interactive map of First Brother Island

Geography
- Location: Ohio River, West Virginia
- Coordinates: 39°22′55″N 81°15′41″W

Administration
- United States

First Brother Island is an island on the Ohio River along the shores of the city of Belmont in Pleasants County, West Virginia, USA. French Creek empties into the Ohio on its eastern end. First Brother Island contains a number of operating oil wells.

== See also ==
- List of islands of West Virginia
- Brother Island for other islands named "Brother"
