= Great Iyu Island =

Island in Indonesia

Coordinates: 1.186702°N 103.345451°E

Great Iyu Island (Pulau Tokong Iyu or Pulau Iyu Besar in Indonesian) is a small uninhabited island in the Strait of Malacca, about 4.5 km north-west of Little Karimun, about 50 km west of Singapore, and about 800 m south-west of Little Iyu Island. The two Iyu islets are known as The Brothers. The island belongs to the Karimun Regency of the Riau Islands Province of Indonesia.

Great Iyu measures about 250 by 150 m and its highest point is about 45 m above sea level.

== See also ==
- Pandang Island and Salahnama Island, also known as The Brothers, about 480 km to the north-west
- Rukan Islands, also known as Three Brothers, about 80 km to the southeast
