= Hall and Prentice =

Australian architectural firm

Hall and Prentice was an architectural firm established in 1919 in Brisbane, Queensland, Australia, through the partnership of Thomas Ramsay Hall (T. R. Hall) and George Gray Prentice (G. G. Prentice). The firm designed many prestigious buildings in the Brisbane area, including Musket Villa, Brisbane City Hall, Sandgate Town Hall and the Tattersalls Club.

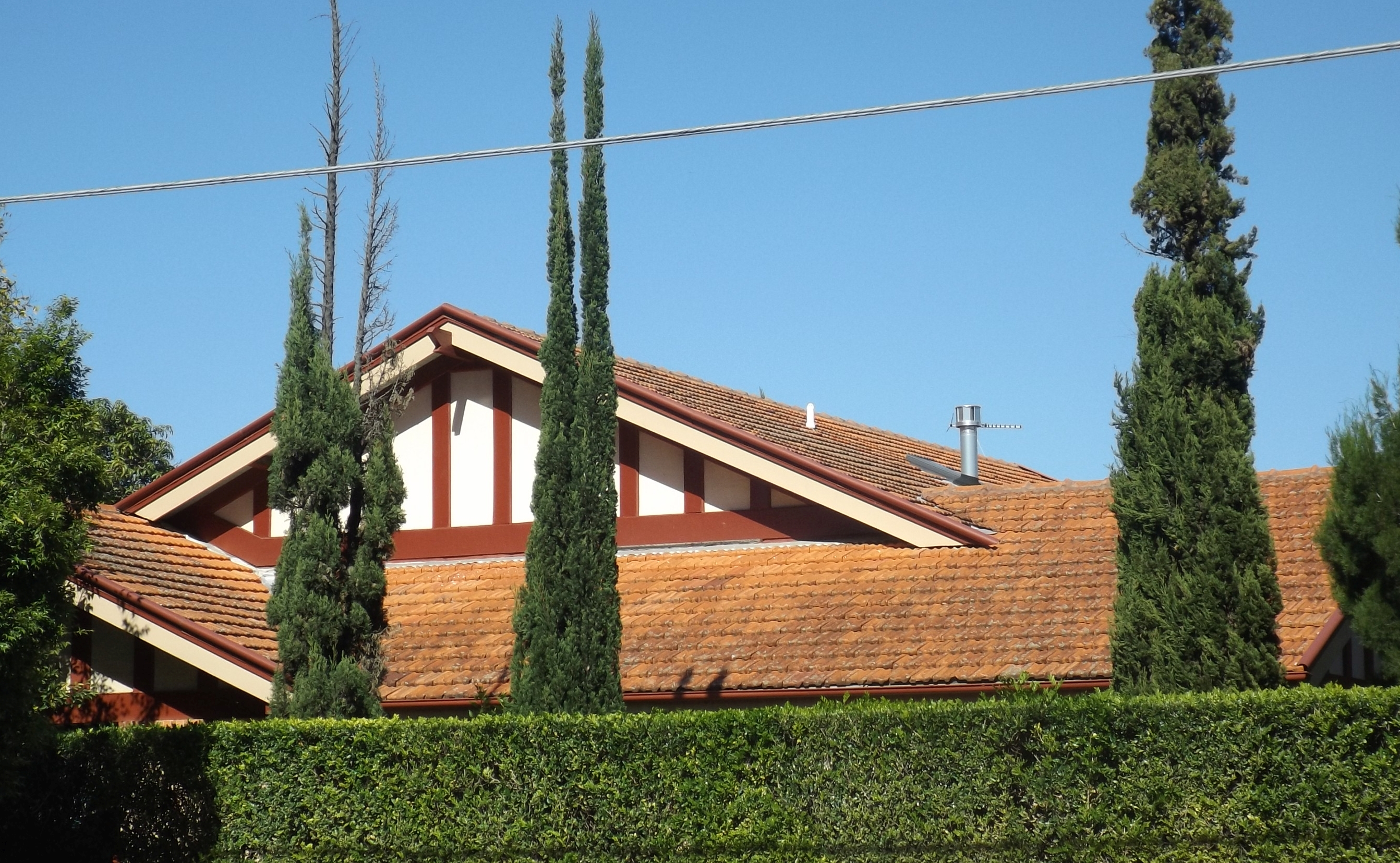
Musket Villa

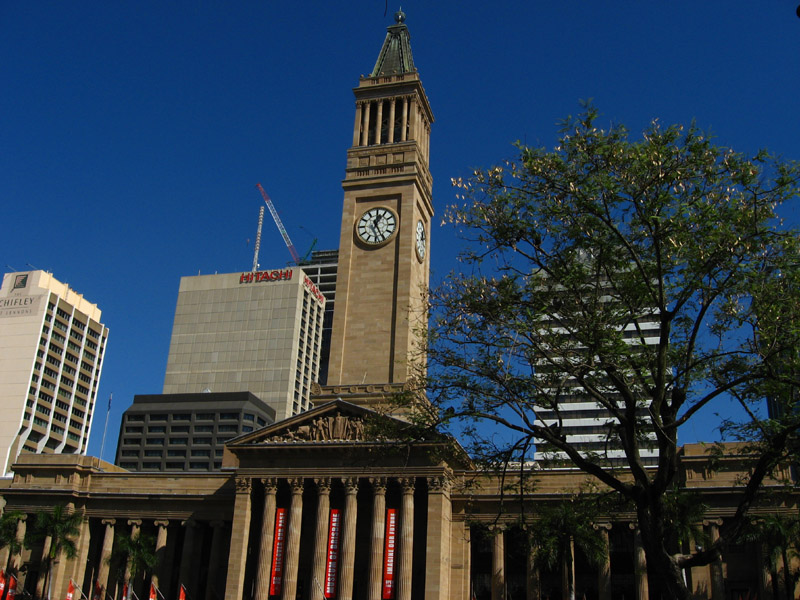
Brisbane City Hall

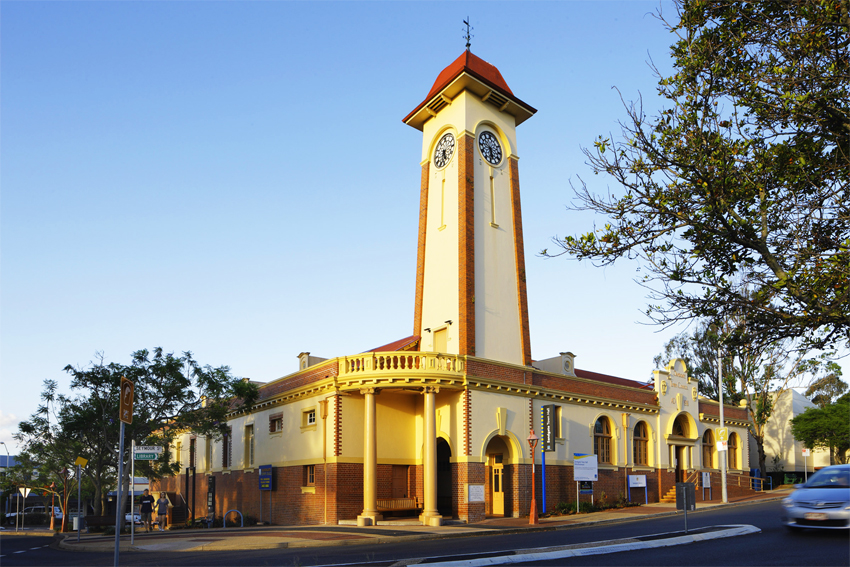
Sandgate Town Hall

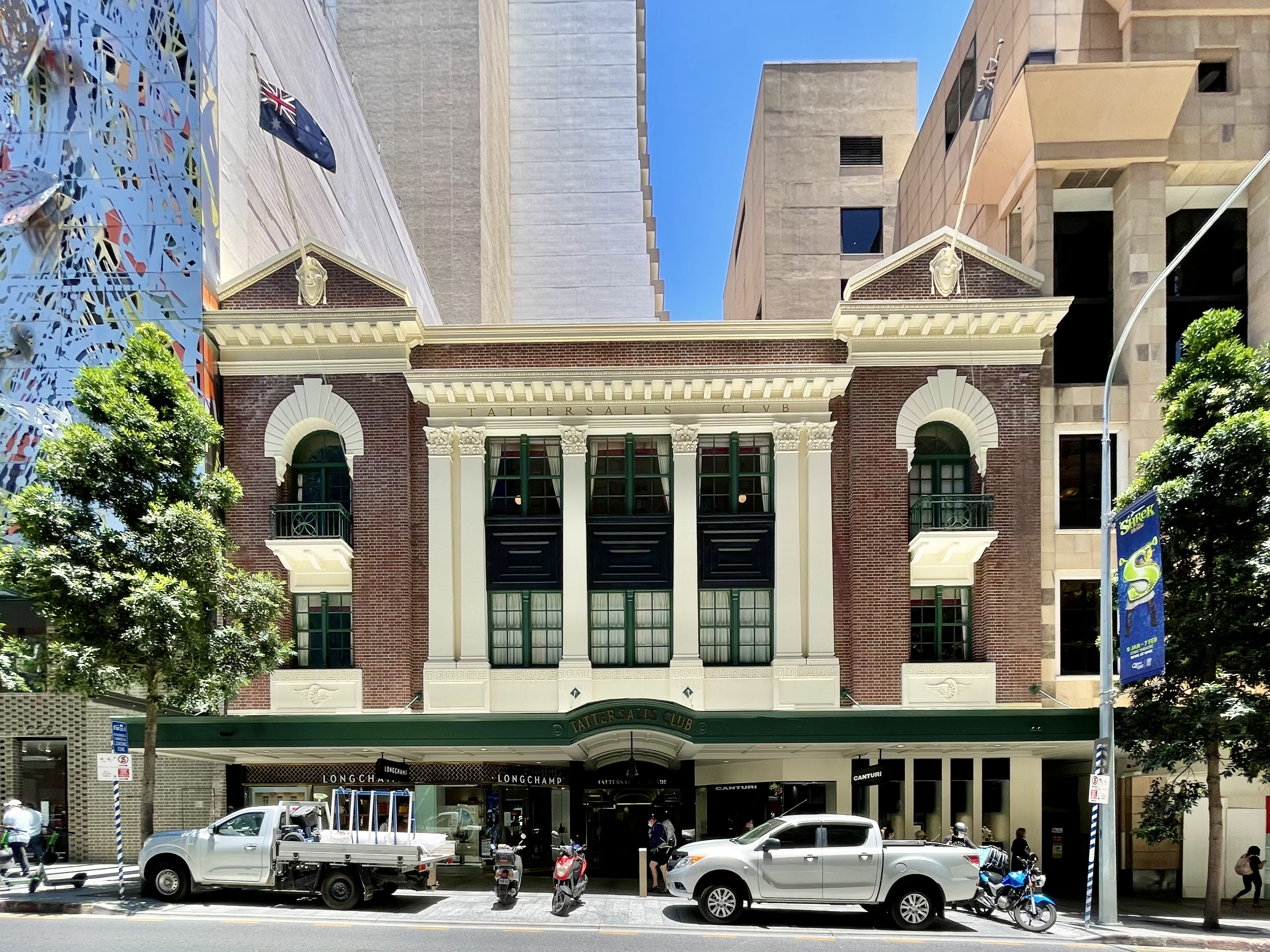
Tattersalls Club, Brisbane, Edward Street facade, 2021

In 1930 Hall left the firm to partner with Lionel Blythewood Phillips. In 1931 Prentice entered into a partnership with William 'Bill' Atkinson to form Atkinson Prentice.
