= Tasman Rip =

Tasman Rip (61°30′S 55°56′W) is a marine channel in the South Shetland Islands, Antarctica running east–west between O'Brien Island and Eadie Island and characterized by strong tidal rips and whirlpools. The channel was crossed by a party of the U.K. Joint Services Expedition to Elephant Island in January 1977, and so named after the Tasman canoes used in the crossing.
