= Pandang Island =

Island in Indonesia

Coordinates: 3.430369°N 99.754932°E

Pandang Island (Pulau Pandang in Indonesian) is a small island in the Strait of Malacca, off the coast of Sumatra, about 47 km from Tanjungbalai and 10 km north of Salahnama Island. It belongs to Indonesia.

The island is about 500 m long and 250 m wide. It is almost entirely surrounded by a coral reef with some above-water rocks. A navigation light is installed on the island. Its highest point is 64 m above sea level.

Pandang and Salahnama are locally known as The Brothers.

== See also ==
- Rukan Islands, also known as Three Brothers, about 560 km to the southeast
- Little Iyu Island and Great Iyu Island, also known as The Brothers, about 480 km to the southeast
