= Little Iyu Island =

Island in Indonesia

Little Iyu Island (Pulau Iyu Kecil in Indonesian) is a small island in the Strait of Malacca, about 4.5 km north-west of Little Karimun Island, about 50 km west of Singapore, and about 800 m north-east of the Great Iyu Island. The two Iyu islets are known as The Brothers.

Little Iyu measures about 200 by 70 m and its highest point is about 45 m above sea level. The island belongs to the Karimun Regency of the Riau Islands Province of Indonesia. The northern tip of Little Iyu is one of the baseline points that define the legal boundaries of Indonesia (1°11′30″N 103°21′08″E).

== See also ==
- Pandang Island and Salahnama Island, also known as The Brothers, about 480 km to the north-west
- Rukan Islands, also known as Three Brothers, about 80 km to the southeast
