= Salahnama Island =

Island in Indonesia

Coordinates: 3.341621°N 99.722694°E

Salahnama Island (Pulau Salahnama in Indonesian) is a small island in the Strait of Malacca, off the coast of Sumatra, about 40 km from Tanjungbalai and 10 km south of Pandang Island. It belongs to Indonesia.

The island is about 500 m long and 250 m wide. It is densely wooded with steep rocky sides rising from the sea. Two above-water rocks lie on the north and south sides, the latter about 800 m from the shore. Its highest point is 89 m above sea level.

Salahnama and Pandang are locally known as The Brothers.

== See also ==
- Rukan Islands, also known as Three Brothers, about 560 km to the southeast
- Little Iyu Island and Great Iyu Island, also known as The Brothers, about 480 km to the southeast
