= Aspland Island =

Island in Antarctica

- Location within Antarctica

Geography
- Location: Antarctica
- Coordinates: 61°28′S 55°55′W

Administration
- Administered under the Antarctic Treaty System

Demographics
- Population: Uninhabited

Aspland Island is a small island 7.4 km (4 nmi) west of Gibbs Island in the South Shetland Islands of Antarctica. The name dates back to at least 1821.

Moonlight Point (61°27′S 55°56′W) is the northwest point of Aspland Island. It was so named by a Joint Services Expedition to the Elephant Island Group (JSEEIG) party canoeing from O'Brien Island to Aspland Island on January 3, 1977, because the point appeared silhouetted against a full moon. The name was approved by the UK Antarctic Place-Names Committee in 1980.

== Birds ==
The island forms part of the Aspland Island and Eadie Island Important Bird Area, identified as such by BirdLife International because both islands support large colonies of chinstrap penguins and southern fulmars.

== See also ==
- List of Antarctic and subantarctic islands
