= Mount Adolphus Island =

Island in Queensland, Australia

Native name: Muri or Mori
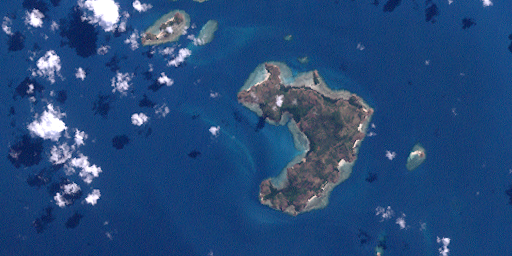
- A satelitte image of Mount Adolphus Island

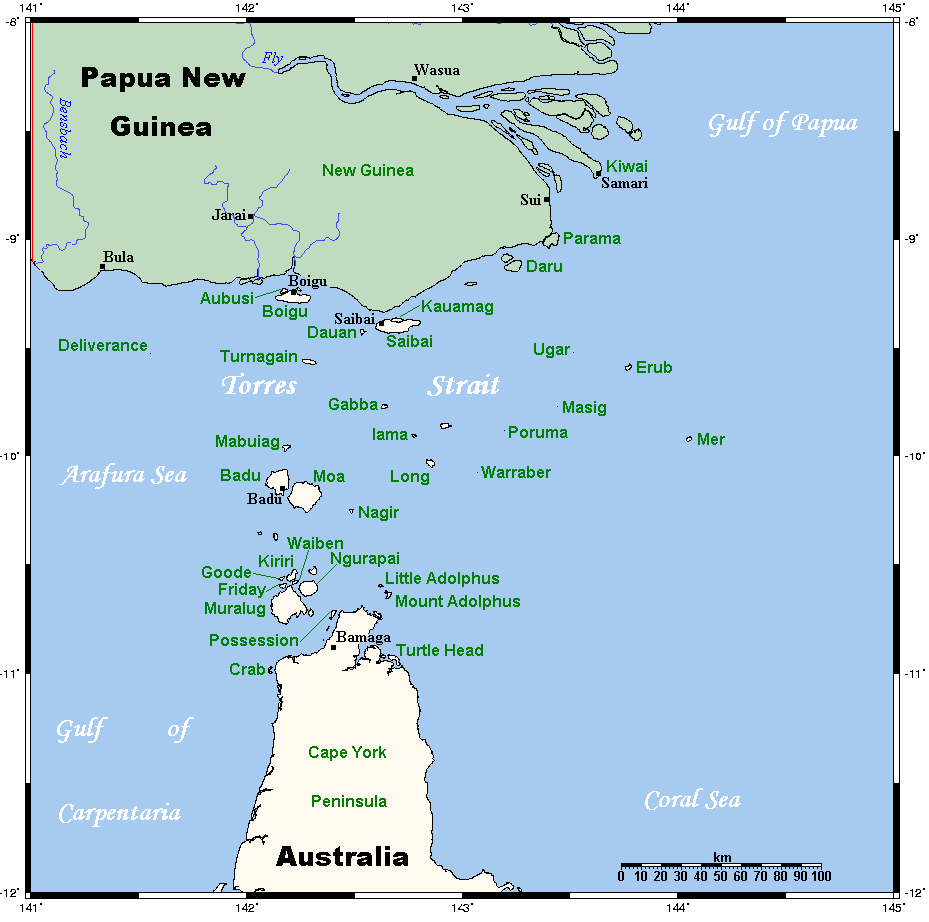
- A map of the Torres Strait Islands showing Mount Adolphus Island in the southeast waters of Torres Strait

Geography
- Location: Adolphus Channel, Cape York Peninsula, Northern Australia
- Coordinates: 10°38′13″S 142°39′07″E
- Archipelago: Torres Strait Islands
- Adjacent to: Torres Strait
- Total islands: 1
- Area: 6.74 km^{2} (2.60 sq mi)
- Length: 4.4 km (2.73 mi)
- Width: 2.1 km (1.3 mi)
- Highest elevation: 150 m (490 ft)
- Highest point: Mount Adolphus

Administration
- Australia
- State: Queensland
- Local government area: Shire of Torres

Mount Adolphus Island, also called Muri or Mori in the native language, is an island of the Torres Strait Islands archipelago that is located at the very tip of Cape York Peninsula on the northern side of the Adolphus Channel, across from Albany Island and about 40 kilometres (25 mi) northeast of Bamaga in the far north region of Queensland, Australia.

== Geography ==
Mount Adolphus Island is 4.4 kilometres (2.7 mi) long, and 2.1 kilometres (1.3 mi) wide at its widest point. It measures 6.74 square kilometres (2.60 sq mi) in area. It is located 10.1 kilometres (6.3 mi) from the Australian mainland. The island's highest elevation is the flat-topped Mount Adolphus (10.6323°S 142.6589°E) at the height of 178 metres (584 ft) above mean sea level.

Coastal features on Mount Adolphus Island include (clockwise from north):

- Lacey Island (10.6094°S 142.6138°E)
- Little Adolphus Island (10.5958°S 142.6179°E)
- Salter Island (10.5980°S 142.6372°E)
- Nicklin Islet (10.6220°S 142.6532°E)
- North East Bluff (10.6301°S 142.6678°E)
- Morilug Islet, also known as Tiakan Islet (10.6414°S 142.6808°E)
- Akone Islet (10.6673°S 142.6698°E)
- Pinnacle Peak (10.6562°S 142.6487°E)
- Cambridge Point (10.6525°S 142.6390°E)
- Dickey Point (10.6491°S 142.6396°E)
- Blackwood Bay (10.6402°S 142.6446°E)

== History ==
Djagaraga (also known as Yadhaigana, Dyagaraga and Yagulleone) is of the languages from the tip of Cape York. The language region includes the landscape within the local government boundaries of the Northern Peninsula Area Regional Council. Traditionally the language was spoken on Eastern Cape York particularly the localities of Albany Island and Mount Adolphus Island.

== Shipwrecks ==
- Aliquis, a ship captained by Gill and sailed from Port Jackson to Calcutta, was lost near Mount Adolphus Island, Torres Strait, in May 1839. There were no deaths. The crew were picked up by the ship Argyle, also bound Sydney to India.
- RMS Quetta, an iron steamship of 3,484 GRT that was built at Dumbarton, Scotland in 1881. Owned by the British India Steam Navigation Company and captained by Alfred Sanders, the ship was bound from Brisbane to London on 6 February 1890. It foundered when she struck a needle of uncharted coral in Mount Adolphus Channel, on 28 February 1890. 134 people died, and there were 158 survivors. A submerged rock had ripped through six water-tight compartments of the hull, from the bows to the engine room. Stokers were killed instantly as water rushed onto the boilers, causing them to explode. Lower-deck portholes burst under the water pressure, and the sea flooded in, swamping passengers asleep in their bunks. For half a minute the ship hung at a 45-degree angle, then she slid slowly beneath the surface. Within less than five minutes of striking the rock she was gone.

== See also ==
- List of Torres Strait Islands
