= Three Brothers (Ozarks) =

Mountains in Arkansas, U.S.

Coordinates: 36°28′36″N 92°28′53″W

Three Brothers is a group of summits in the U.S. state of Arkansas. The summits are located in northwestern Baxter County and are traversed by Arkansas Route 5. The community of Three Brothers, Arkansas lies about 1.5 miles to the southeast of the peaks. The western peak of the group reaches an elevation of just over 1320 feet.

There are three mountains in the group, hence the name.
