= Three Brothers, Okhotsk Sea =

Islets in Magadan Oblast, Russia

Coordinates: 59.4795385°N 150.9732381°E

The Three Brothers is a group of steep white islets in the Sea of Okhotsk, about 650 m off the Eastern Cape, just outside Veselaya Bay, about 13 km from the town of Magadan in the Kamchatka peninsula, Russia. It is a local tourist landmark and a favorite target for photographers.

== See also ==
- Three Brothers or Tri Brata a group of three upright rocks in Avacha Bay, Kamchatka
