= Three Brothers, Arkansas =

Unincorporated community in Arkansas, US

Coordinates: 36°27′09″N 92°27′57″W

Three Brothers is an unincorporated community in northwestern Baxter County, Arkansas, United States.

The community is located on Arkansas Highway 5 approximately three miles south of the Arkansas–Missouri state line. The site is situated on a ridge three miles northeast of an arm of Bull Shoals Lake and eight miles northwest of Mountain Home.

The community was formerly known as Vin, and was once a thriving community with a newspaper, The Ozark Clarion. A post office called Three Brothers was established in 1912, and remained in operation until 1953. The community was named after nearby Three Brothers mountain which lie approximately 1.5 miles to the northwest along Route 5.
