= Watson, Ferguson and Company =

- Industry: Printing
- Founders: John Watson, James Ferguson
- Headquarters: Queensland, Australia

Watson, Ferguson and Company is the longest running printing company in Queensland, Australia. It was established by John Watson and James Ferguson in the mid nineteenth century as a firm specialising in book selling, stationery manufacturing, lithography and printing. In 1890 it was the manufacturer of one of the world's smallest dictionaries. The company's second premises in Queen Street, Brisbane, was part of a row of buildings designed by Richard Gailey which include the Queensland Heritage Register listed Palings Building. Throughout the first part of the twentieth century, the company was the oldest operating business in Queen Street.

== John Watson ==
John Watson was born near Glasgow, Scotland around 1830 and, at the age of sixteen, left for Indiana in the United States of America, prior to arriving in New South Wales, Australia, in pursuit of gold. He eventually settled in Brisbane around 1859 where he operated a successful photographic studio until 1873. John Watson and his wife, Elizabeth Selim, died when the RMS Quetta was wrecked on the Far North Queensland coast in 1890.

The Watsons had no children and certain conditions were in place in James Watson's will dependent on who survived the other. As the Watsons were seen falling into the water within sixty seconds of one another, it was difficult to determine who had predeceased each other in the wreck, and the courts became involved in establishing survivorship and determining who were the beneficiaries of estate. The estate included the partnership property of Watson, Ferguson and Co.

== James Ferguson ==
James Ferguson was born in Ardentallan, Oban, Scotland on July 26, 1839. He arrived in Australia on board 'The Great Britain', one of the earliest steamships travelling between the United Kingdom and Australia. After spending some time in Sydney, in 1870 he arrived in Brisbane to manage the printing business started by William Gowans in 1868. After William Gowan's death, James Ferguson took over the business, and renamed it Ferguson and Company. James Ferguson died on 24 April 1926.

== History (1871–1930) ==
In 1871 John Watson and James Ferguson went into partnership, renamed the business Watson, Ferguson and Company and significantly expanded the business at 69 Queen Street. Watson had experience as a printer and engineer while Ferguson had experience as a bookseller and stationer.

In 1882, the company built a four-storey building designed by Richard Gailey on the site of the original Supreme Court and Parliament House buildings and opposite the site of the company's first store at 69 Queen Street. The basement contained the printing and store while the upper storeys contained retail space, a wholesale area, office space and an area for artists engaged in engraving and illumination to work. When John and Elizabeth Watson died in 1890, James Ferguson became the sole principal.

In 1909, Watson and Ferguson commenced offering subscription and circulating library services from their Queen Street premises and, during the holiday season, at Southport and merged their business into a limited liability concern. In 1914, the business built a large printery and bookbinding factory on the corner of Glenelg and Stanley Streets with the assistance of the Municipality of South Brisbane. In 1919, the company expanded their business to include a cabinet making section to manufacture office furniture.

Following the death of James Ferguson in 1926, his son Eric Abbott, took over as joint manager. In 1930, the company was listed on the Australian Stock Exchange.
