= Three Brothers, Lancashire =

Three standing stones in Lancashire, England

Three Brothers
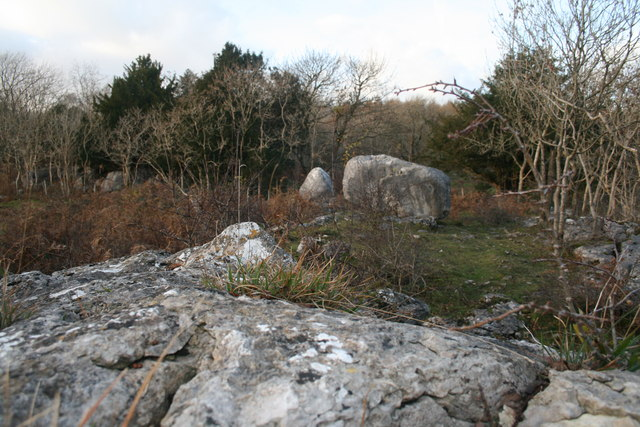

- Location within the City of Lancaster district
- 54.15465°N 2.77539°W
- Location: Lancashire

Site notes
- Architectural style: British pre-Roman Architecture

The Three Brothers (grid reference SD494734) are three erratic boulders or standing stone hilltop altars located in the hills above Morecambe Bay, immediately north of Warton Crag. The site was surveyed by Alexander Thom. It is accessible along a footpath through woodland.
