= Albany Island =

Island in Queensland, Australia

Native name: Pabaju
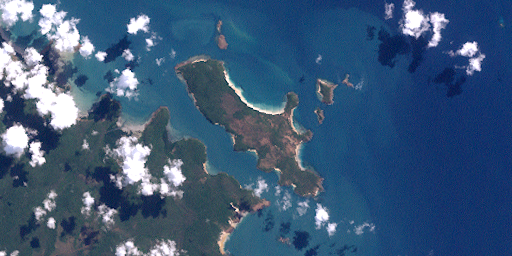
- Albany Island (Pictured in center)

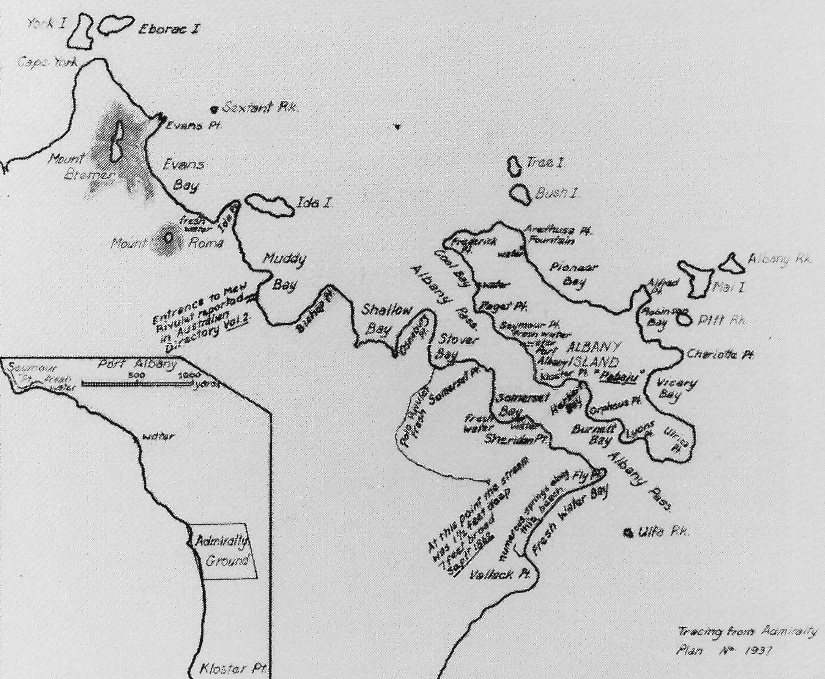
- Admiralty Plan No. 1937. Plan drawn in 1862 showing site on Albany Island advised for the proposed Cape York Station, and the best position for the township on the mainland opposite.

Geography
- Archipelago: Torres Strait Islands
- Length: 6 km (3.7 mi)

Administration
- Australia

Albany Island or Pabaju is an island off the north-eastern coast of Cape York Peninsula in the Adolphus Channel of Queensland, Australia. It is within the locality of Somerset in the Shire of Torres.

== Geography ==
Albany Island is off the north-eastern coast in the Cape York Peninsula about 20 km (12 mi) East of Bamaga, and 6 km (3.7 mi) southeast of the tip of Cape York. It is separated from the peninsula by the Albany Passage (10.7392°S 142.6000°E).

The island is a part of the Maner group of islands and the Torres Strait Islands; it is about 6 km (3.7 mi) long and is volcanic with fringing coral reefs. It was part of the territory of the Djagaraga or Gudang people.

The island was surveyed in 1848 by Owen Stanley RN and part of the island was named Port Albany (10.7327°S 142.6004°E).

A bêche-de-mer station was established on the island in 1862 by C. Edwards and J. Frazer. After an inspection by Queensland's Governor Bowen, a settlement was planned for the island but it was built instead on the adjacent mainland in 1863 at Somerset, Queensland. There was still a trochus shell farm there in 1995, and there is now an operational pearl farm.

The wreck of the RMS Quetta, a passenger ship that sank in 1890, lies just off Albany Island. The ship hit an uncharted rock and sank in a very short time killing 134 people.

== History ==
Djagaraga (also known as Yadhaigana, Dyagaraga and Yagulleone) is of the languages from the tip of Cape York. The language region includes the landscape within the local government boundaries of the Northern Peninsula Area Regional Council. Traditionally the language was spoken on Eastern Cape York particularly the localities of Albany Island and Mount Adolphus Island.

The island was surveyed in the mid 1860s, as planning was underway to build settlement and a port on the island

The island was named Albany in 1846 by Lieutenant Yule of HMS Rattlesnake, in honour of Frederick, Duke of Albany, who was the brother of King George IV. Albany Island is also closely associated with one of Queensland's worst maritime disasters, the sinking of the RMS Quetta. The passenger ship struck an uncharted rock in the Adolphus Channel, just off Albany Island in 1890, with the loss of 134 people.

== Footnotes ==
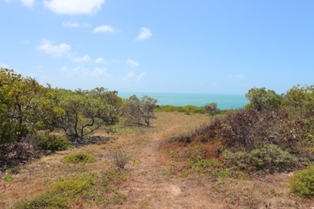
Albany Island
