= O'Brien Island =

Island of Antarctica

- Location within Antarctica

Geography
- Location: Antarctica
- Coordinates: 61°30′S 55°58′W
- Highest elevation: 540 m (1770 ft)

Administration
- Administered under the Antarctic Treaty System

Demographics
- Population: Uninhabited

O'Brien Island is a small rocky island in the South Shetland Islands of Antarctica. It lies 4 kilometres (2 nmi) south-west of Aspland Island and rises to 540 m. A strong marine channel, named Tasman Rip, runs between O'Brien Island and Eadie Island.

The name dates back to the survey of the South Shetlands carried out by Edward Bransfield and William Smith in 1820, when it was applied to O'Brien, Eadie and Aspland Islands as a group. It is now established in international usage.

== Important Bird Area ==
The island has been identified as an Important Bird Area (IBA) by BirdLife International because there are records (from 1977) of it supporting large breeding colonies of chinstrap penguins (21,000 pairs) and southern fulmars (8000 pairs).

== See also ==
- List of Antarctic and Subantarctic islands
