= Adolphus Channel =

- Location within Queensland

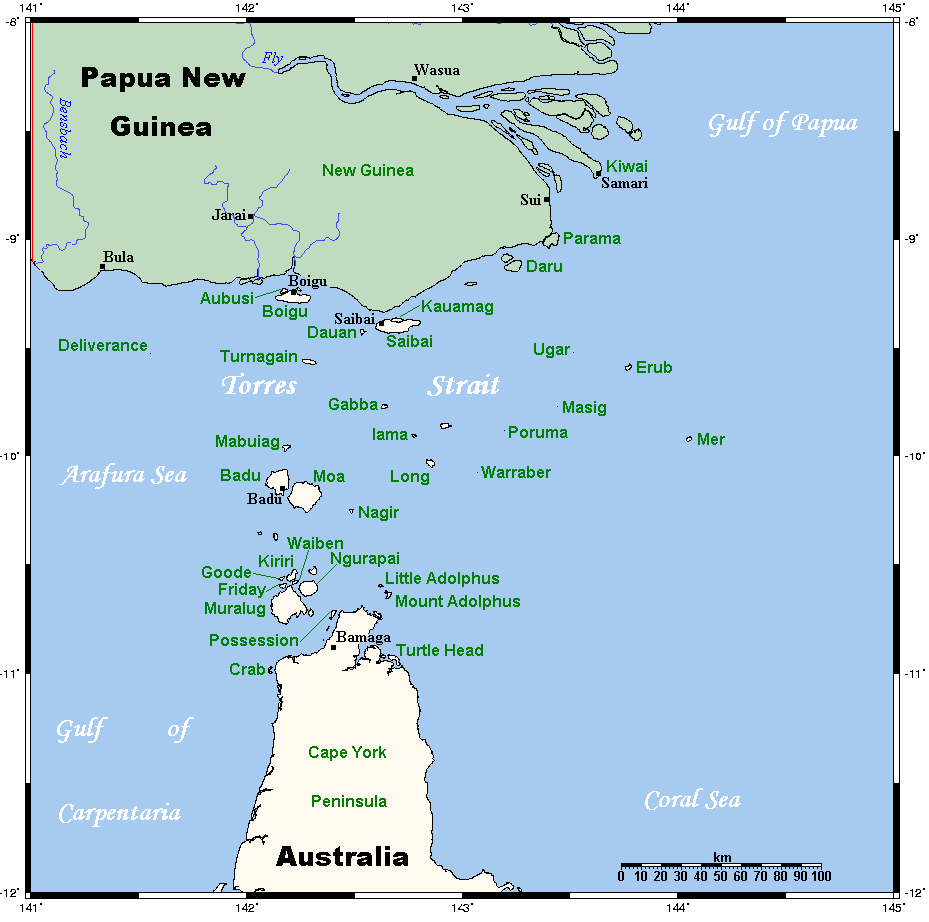
- A map of the Torres Strait Islands, with the Adolphus Channel located south of Mount Adolphus Island in the Torres Strait
- Location: Northern Australia
- Coordinates: 10°41′20″S 142°36′51″E
- Type: Channel
- Part of: Torres Strait
- Ocean/sea sources: Coral Sea, South Pacific Ocean
- Basin countries: Australia
- Managing agency: Torres Strait Island Region
- Islands: Albany Island; Bush Island; Eborac Island; Ida Island; Middle Brother Island

The Adolphus Channel is a channel located in the Torres Strait, situated northeast of Cape York, in Queensland, Australia.

== Geography ==
The channel runs north of the Albany Island, one of the islands of the Manar group of the Torres Strait Islands archipelago, and to the south of Mount Adolphus Island.

It is about 7 km (4.3 mi) across at its narrowest point, mostly less than about 20 m (66 ft) in depth and opens towards the west (into the Torres Strait) and towards the east (into the Great Barrier Reef lagoon). Submarine dunes (sand waves) up to 5 m (16 ft) tall migrate along the Adolphus Channel seabed, posing a potential risk to safe navigation.

Much of the area has dual naming with traditional names from the Torres Strait Islander people.

== Shipping use ==
Adolphus Channel is a major shipping route for traffic passing from the eastern (Coral Sea) coast of Australia to the Gulf of Carpentaria, Arafura Sea and regions further west.

== History ==
On the night of 28 February 1890, the Royal Mail Ship RMS Quetta struck a rock and sank in Adolphus Channel, sending 134 of her passengers to their deaths.

== Islands ==
Adjacent to the channel are a group of islands, part of the Torres Strait Islands archipelago, comprising:

- Albany Island
- Bush Islet
- Eborac Island
- Ida Island
- Mai Islet
- Middle Brother Islet
- Tree Island

Ida Island is north and adjacent to Muddy Bay, while the remaining islets are adjacent to Pioneer Bay on the north east coast of Albany Island.

== See also ==
- List of Torres Strait Islands
