= Eadie Island =

Important Bird Area in Antarctica

Coordinates: 61°28′S 55°57′W

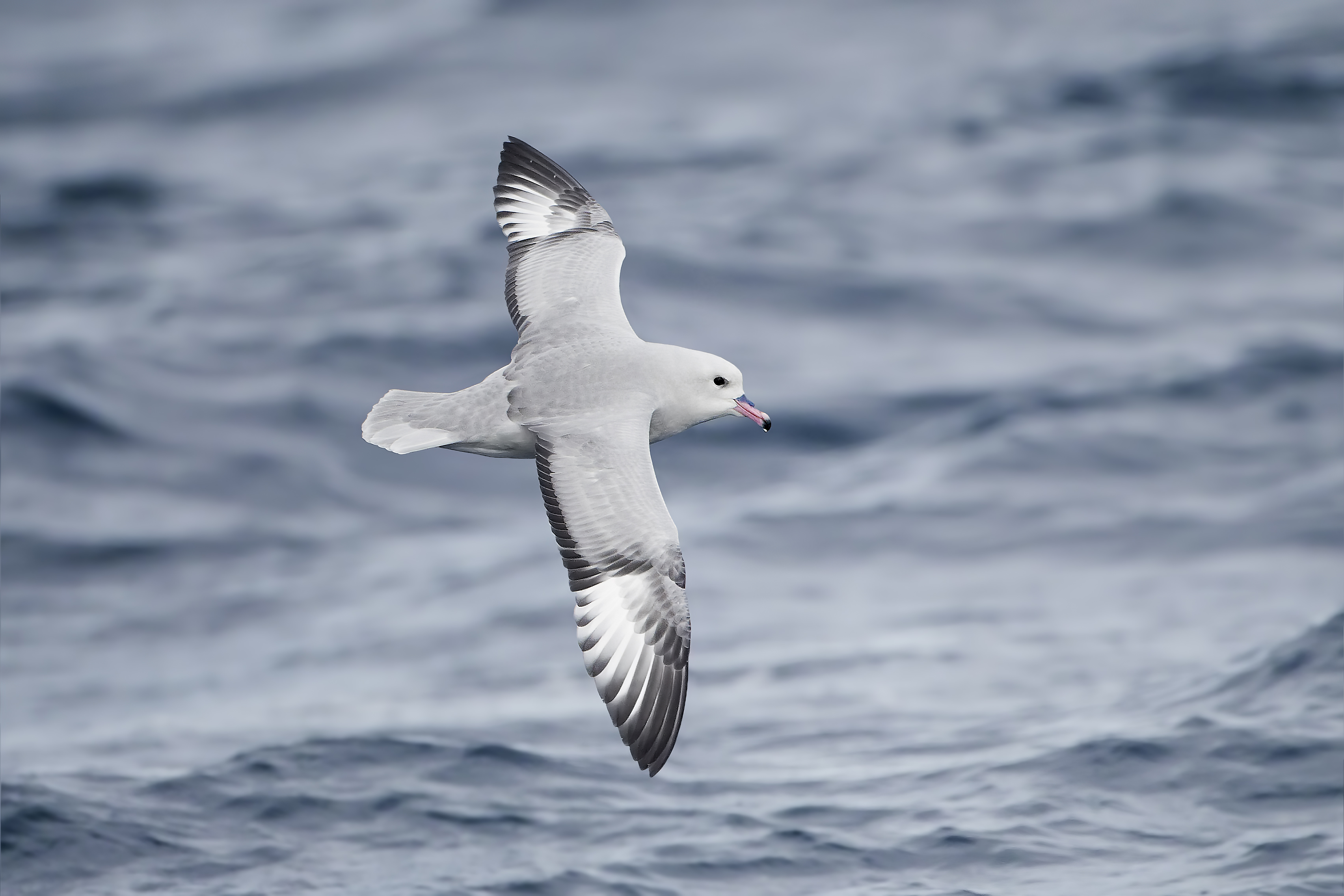
Southern fulmars breed on the island

Location of Eadie Island

Eadie Island is an island 2 km (1.2 mi) long which lies between Aspland Island and O'Brien Island, in the South Shetland Islands of Antarctica. A strong marine channel, named Tasman Rip, runs between Eadie Island and O'Brien Island.

The island was first charted with its neighbours in February 1820, as the three 'O'Brien Islands', during a survey of the South Shetlands carried out by Edward Bransfield and William Smith (mariner). A year later they were rediscovered by a Russian expedition under Fabian Gottlieb von Bellingshausen, who used the name "Ostrova Tri Brata" (Three Brothers) for the present Aspland, Eadie and O'Brien Islands. Eadie Island was then named for the dockyard manager of the Melbourne Harbor Trust of Williamstown, Australia, by Lieutenant L. C. Hill of the Royal Naval Reserve, captain of the Discovery II, which engaged in survey work in the area in 1936–37.

== Birds ==
The island forms part of the Aspland Island and Eadie Island Important Bird Area, identified as such by BirdLife International because both islands support large colonies of chinstrap penguins and southern fulmars.

== See also ==
- List of Antarctic and subantarctic islands
