= Three Brothers (islands), Alaska =

Small reef of Kodiak Island, Alaska

Coordinates: 57.9234361°N 152.5528118°W

The Three Brothers is a small reef located off the north coast of Kodiak Island, Alaska, about 2 km east of Shakmanof Point and 2.5 km west of Ouzinkie.

The reef spans about 550 m in the southwest to northeast direction, and some parts of it uncover about 60 cm. Two rocks at the southwest end uncover by about 1.2 m, and one rock at the northeast end uncovers by about 1 m. There is a light on the southwesternmost rock. A kelp forest extends about 250 yards south of the light toward Low Island, Alaska.
