= Tattersalls Club =

Heritage-listed club house in Brisbane, Queensland

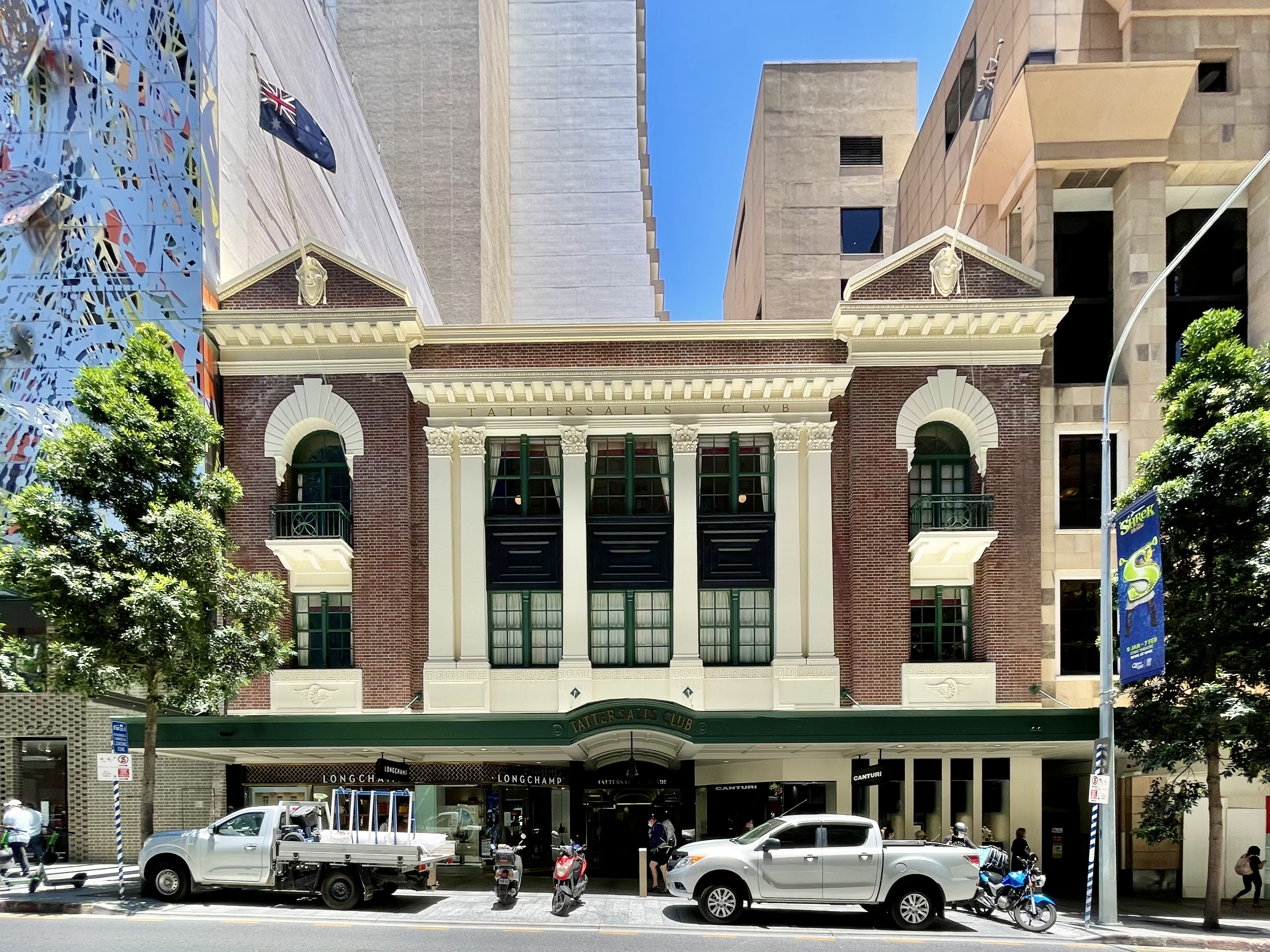
- Tattersalls Club, Edward Street frontage, 2021

- Location within Queensland Location within Australia
- 27.4688°S 153.0269°E
- Location: 206 Edward Street, Brisbane City, Queensland, Australia

History
- Design period: 1919–1930s (interwar period)
- Built: 1925–1949
- Built for: Tattersalls Club

Site notes
- Architect: Hall and Prentice
- Owner: Tattersalls Club

Queensland Heritage Register
- Official name: Tattersalls Club
- Type: state heritage (built)
- Designated: 21 October 1992
- Reference no.: 600093
- Significant period: 1925–1926, 1939, 1949 (fabric)
- Significant components: other – recreation/entertainment: component, library – collection, hall, dining room

Tattersalls Club is a heritage-listed club house at 206 Edward Street (with a second frontage on Queen Street), Brisbane City, Queensland, Australia. It was designed by Hall and Prentice and built from 1925 to 1949. It was added to the Queensland Heritage Register on 21 October 1992.

== History ==
These clubrooms were constructed for the Tattersalls Club of Brisbane in 1925–26, with extensions in 1938–39 and 1949.

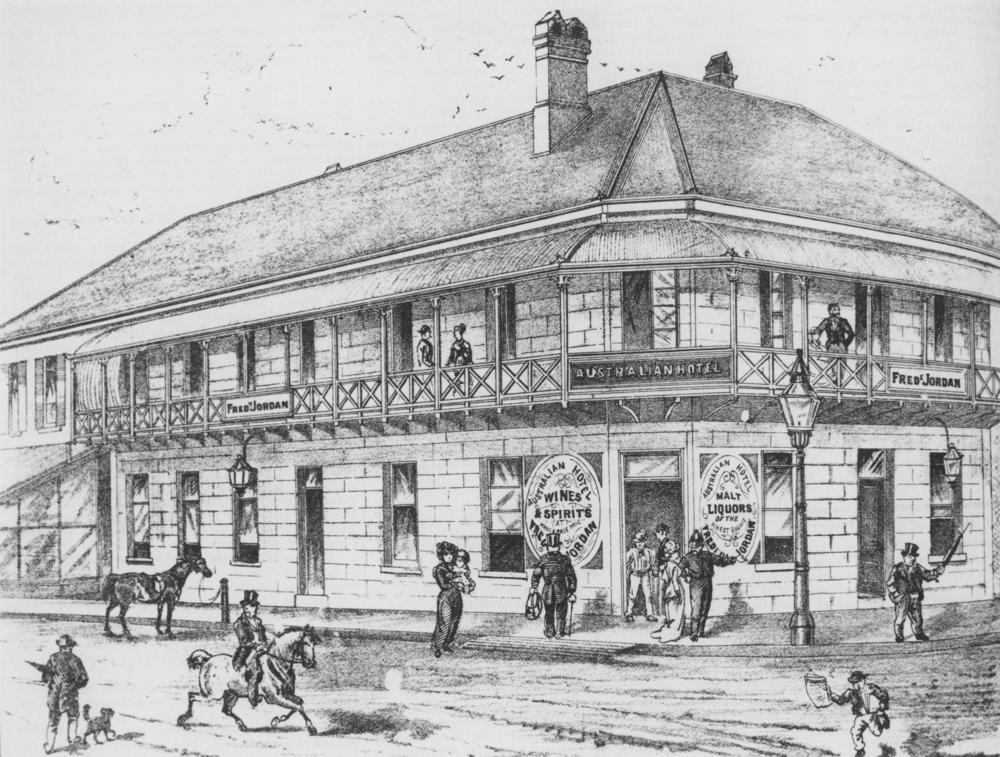
Australian Hotel, used by Tattersalls Club, circa 1886

Tattersalls Club was formed in November 1883, following the model of sporting clubs established in Britain. It was particularly concerned with horse racing, and the club held its first race meeting in 1884. Tattersalls Club met in the Australian Hotel at the corner of Queen and Albert Streets from 1883 until 1888 and then subsequently leased various premises as its clubrooms. Tattersalls made several inner city property investments, the sale of which financed the acquisition of a site in Edward Street for new clubrooms, as well as a 6-by-64-foot (1.8 by 19.5 m) right-of-way to Queen Street.

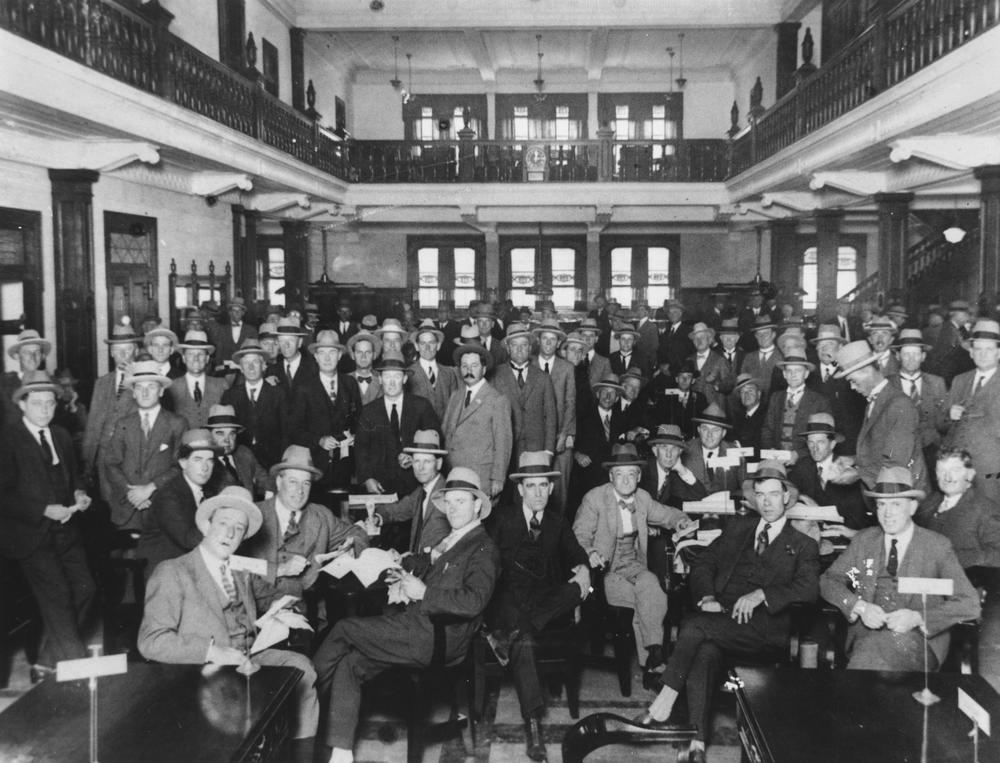
Settling day for bookmakers and clients at Tattersalls Club on Edward Street Brisbane, 1926

The new clubrooms were designed by Hall and Prentice, architects for Brisbane's new City Hall, and the contractors were Green and Sons. Erected at a cost of £41,000, with an additional £5,000 spent on fittings and furnishings, Tattersalls Club was opened on 28 July 1926 and provided billiard, card, reading and dining rooms for its members. The main hall was modelled on the repository at Tattersalls auction room in London. Sculptor Daphne Mayo executed the decorative plaster frieze entitled The Horse in Sport along the wall of the Queen Street entrance passageway.

In 1936 an adjoining property in Queen Street was bought for £18,500 to enable the clubrooms to be extended. Constructed by J Hutchinson and Son, to the designs of T R Hall and L B Phillips, these extensions contained a new Art Deco dining room and were opened on 27 June 1939. The Members' Dining Room features a 10.7-metre (35 ft) high ceiling, Queensland maple and silky oak, a mezzanine balcony, and murals created by local artists W Bustard, C H Lancaster, P Stanhope Hobday and Melville Haysom that depict the Australian landscape. The Art Deco features of this stunning room includes several decorative windows, grooved plasterwork in the ceiling and striking marble columns. In 1949 further Queen Street property was acquired and again the club expanded with the provision of a library and new offices.

In 1990 Tattersalls was refurbished with altered floor levels at a cost of $5,000,000. A new Queen Street entrance was constructed, and incorporated a vaulted ceiling and the Daphne Mayo friezes from the original entry.

== Description ==
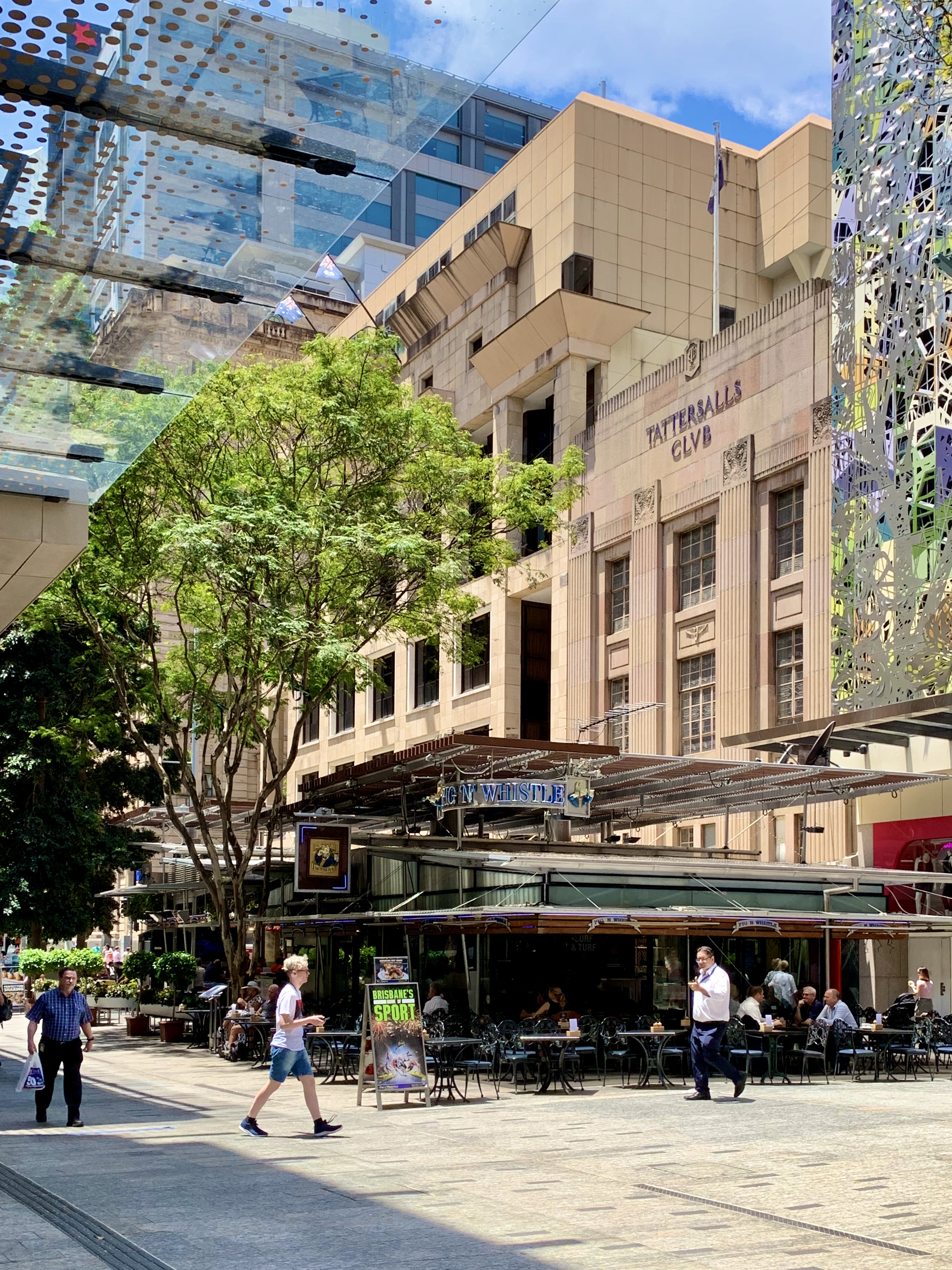
Queen Street frontage, 2019

Tattersalls Club is a three- and four-storeyed building with frontages to Edward Street and Queen Streets.

The Edward Street facade is in the Classical Revival style and in materials and detail is linked with the neighbouring Ascot Chambers. The central three bays on the upper two levels have flanking Giant order pilasters, with double pilasters, at each end. The two outer sections have arched openings on the top level and a cantilevered balcony with cast iron railings. Below the cantilevered steel awning the building has modern shopfronts to each side of the arcade.

The later Queen Street facade is in the Art Deco style and comprises three bays separated by giant order pilasters. The parapet has the name "TATTERSALLS CLUB". The building has Benedict stone facing on a concrete frame. Recent additions are aluminium sun-hoods to the windows of the upper two levels. Below the building's cantilevered awning are modern shopfronts. The recent renovation of the arcade has seen the reinstatement of the Daphne Mayo frieze above the shopfronts.

The upper floors of the Edward Street building contain the main hall. An ornate fibrous plaster vaulted ceiling supported on timber trusses spans the hall and the back wall contains another frieze by the Daphne Mayo. The upper gallery contains a barber shop, turkish baths, card room, reception rooms and library. The dining hall located on the upper floors of the Queen Street building has a 10.7-metre (35 ft) high ceiling and walls decorated in grey and white marble. This space features wall paintings by local artists. The arcade on the ground floor dates from the 1990 refurbishment.

== Heritage listing ==
Tattersalls Club was listed on the Queensland Heritage Register on 21 October 1992 having satisfied the following criteria.

The place is important in demonstrating the evolution or pattern of Queensland's history.

The club buildings are significant for their close association with the Tattersalls Club, one of Brisbane's most prestigious social and sporting clubs.

They are an important illustration of the importation and translation of English social traditions to Queensland, remaining a substantially intact example of a traditional gentlemen's club providing luxuriously appointed rooms and facilities for its members.

The place is important in demonstrating the principal characteristics of a particular class of cultural places.

They are an important illustration of the importation and translation of English social traditions to Queensland, remaining a substantially intact example of a traditional gentlemen's club providing luxuriously appointed rooms and facilities for its members.

The buildings are significant for the quality and intactness of the interiors on the upper levels, which incorporate Queensland materials and works by local artists.

The place is important because of its aesthetic significance.

The friezes are the work of prominent Queensland sculptor, Daphne Mayo, and are considered particularly good illustrations of her work. The facades are good examples of the Classical Revival and Art Deco Styles by important Brisbane architects Hall and Prentice, and later, Hall and Phillips.

The place has a special association with the life or work of a particular person, group or organisation of importance in Queensland's history.

The friezes are the work of prominent Queensland sculptor, Daphne Mayo, and are considered particularly good illustrations of her work. The facades are good examples of the Classical Revival and Art Deco Styles by important Brisbane architects Hall and Prentice, and later, Hall and Phillips.

== Tattersall’s Club Landscape Art Prize ==
Since 1990, initiated by chief executive Paul Jones, Tattersall's Club has conducted an acquisitive art prize known as the Tattersall’s Club Landscape Art Prize. The entries are toured by Museums & Galleries Queensland. Entrants and winners are typically artists in their mid and senior careers.
