= North and South Brother Islands (Connecticut) =

Island in the United States of America

North Brother Island is a small island in Long Island Sound, part of the town of East Lyme, Connecticut. Its coordinates are 41°17′34″N 72°14′41″W, just off the coast. Its companion, South Brother Island is also a part of the town of East Lyme. Its coordinates are 41 degrees, 17 minutes 22 seconds North and 72 degrees, 14 minutes, 22 seconds West.
