= Tri Brata =

Rock formation in Avacha Bay, Kamchatka, Russia

Coordinates: 52.8931°N 158.689°E

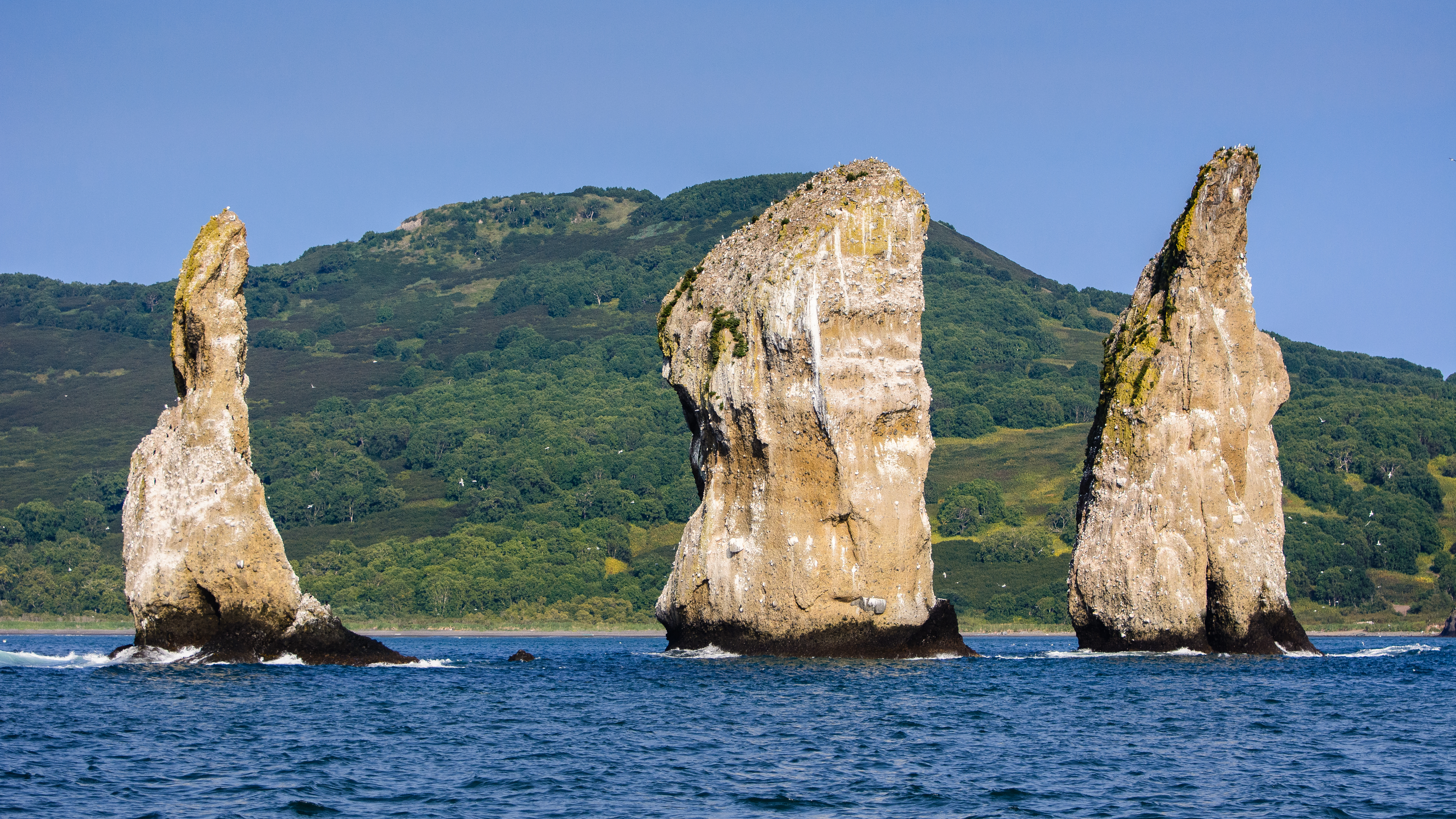
The Tri Brata

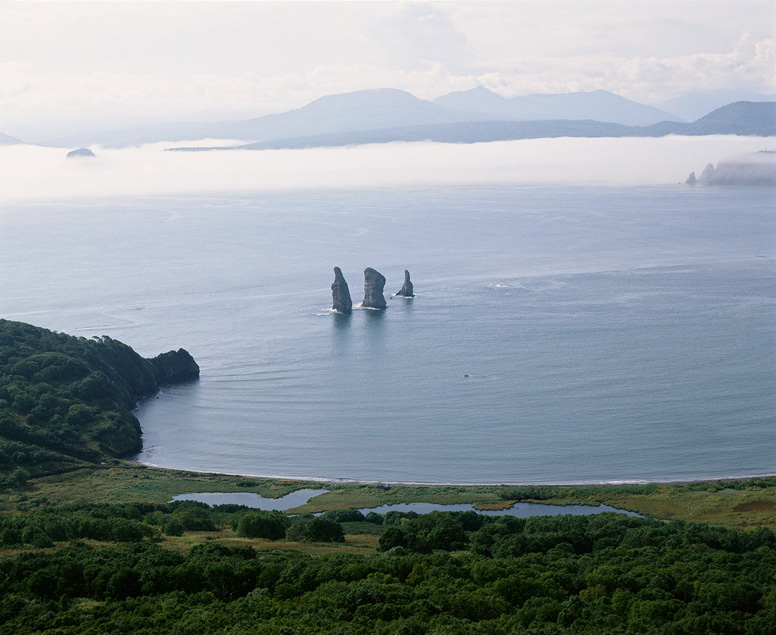
Another view of the Tri Brata

Tri Brata (Russian: Три Брата; literally: "three brothers") are a set of three rocks at the entrance to the Avacha Bay, 400 meters (1,300 ft) west of cape Mys Zhukova. The rocks are spread 200 meters (660 ft) on an east-west alignment. The floor area of each rock measures between 1,500 and 1,600 square meters (16,000 and 17,000 sq ft), which results in an aggregate area of one-half hectare (1.2 acres). The stack, or kekur, is considered a symbol of Petropavlovsk-Kamchatsky.

Local lore suggests that they are three brothers who went to defend the town from a tsunami and turned to stone.
