= Rukan Islands =

Group of islands in Indonesia

The Rukan Islands (Kepulauan Rukan in Indonesian language), also known as the Three Brothers, is a group of three small islands at the south entrance of Durian Strait, in the Riau Islands Province of Indonesia, off the north coast of Sumatra near Singapore. The group extends about 7.2 km north to south, and is surrounded by many dangerous wrecks.

- South Brother (Rukan Selatan), located at 0°32′20″N 103°47′45″E, is L-shaped, about 1.7 km north to south and 1.6 km east to west, and about 400 m wide for most of its length, with a conspicuous white cliff or rock on the north east. The highest point is about 43 m above sea level. Reefs extend some distance south of the island. There is a lighthouse on the island, established 1911.
- Middle Brother (Rukan Tengah), located at 0.576635°N 103.773148°E, lies almost due north of South Brother; the two islands are about 1.3 km apart. It is about 1 km long east to west, and about 200 m wide. Its highest point is about 47 m above sea level.
- North Brother (Rukan Utara), also called or Round Brother and located at 0.623668°N 103.758385°E, is a wooded rock about 500 m east to west and 400 m north to south. Its highest point is about 24 m above sea level. It lies about 5 north and 1 km west of Middle Brother, and about 4 km east of Sanglar Island. A tail of reefs extends about 1.5 km from the island towards Middle Brother. There is a lighthouse on the island.
