= List of geological features on Triton =

An annotated map of Triton with named features labelled

This is a list of named geological features on Triton.

== Catenae (crater chains) ==
Catena	Named after	Name approved (Date · Ref)
Kraken Catena	The Kraken (Norse)	1991 · WGPSN
Set Catena	Set (Egypt)	1991 · WGPSN

== Cavi ==
Tritonian cavi are named after mythological water spirits.

Cavus	Named after	Name approved (Date · Ref)
Apep Cavus	Apep (Egyptian)	1991 · WGPSN
Bheki Cavus	Bheki (Indian)	1991 · WGPSN
Dagon Cavus	Dagon (Babylonian)	1991 · WGPSN
Hekt Cavus	Heqet (Egyptian)	1991 · WGPSN
Hirugo Cavus	Hiruko (Japanese)	1991 · WGPSN
Kasyapa Cavus	Kashyapa (Hindu)	1991 · WGPSN
Kulilu Cavus	Kulilu (Babylonian)	1991 · WGPSN
Mah Cavus	Mah (Persian)	1991 · WGPSN
Mangwe Cavus	Mangwe (Ila people of Zambia)	1991 · WGPSN
Ukupanio Cavus	Ukupanipo (Hawaiian)	1991 · WGPSN

== Craters ==
Crater	Named after	Name approved (Date · Ref)
Amarum	Amarum (Quechua people of Ecuador)	1991 · WGPSN
Andvari	Andvari (Norse)	1991 · WGPSN
Cay	Cay (Mayan)	1991 · WGPSN
Ilomba	Ilomba (Lozi people of Zambia)	1991 · WGPSN
Kurma	Kurma (Hindu)	1991 · WGPSN
Mazomba	Mazomba (Chaga people of Tanzania)	1991 · WGPSN
Ravgga	Ravgga (Finnish)	1991 · WGPSN
Tangaroa	Tangaroa (Māori)	1991 · WGPSN
Unga	Unga (Inuit)	2024 · WGPSN
Vodyanoy	The Vodyanoi (Slavic)	1991 · WGPSN
Xuuch	Underground cistern (Yucatec Maya)	2024 · WGPSN
Yara	Iara (Tupi)	2024 · WGPSN

== Dorsa (ridges) ==
Dorsum	Coordinates	Named after	Name approved (Date · Ref)
Awib Dorsa	7°S 80°W	Word for 'rain' from the Nama language	1991 · WGPSN

== Fossae (ditches) ==
Tritonian fossae are named after sacred bodies of water.

Fossa	Coordinates	Named after	Name approved (Date · Ref)
Jumna Fossae	13.5°S 44°E	Jumna River, India	1991 · WGPSN
Raz Fossae	8°N 21.5°E	Pointe du Raz, Brittany	1991 · WGPSN
Yenisey Fossa	3°N 56.2°E	Yenisey River, Siberia	1991 · WGPSN

== Maculae (dark spots) ==
Tritonian maculae are named after water spirits from various mythologies.

Macula	Named after	Name approved (Date · Ref)
Akupara Maculae	Akupara, Hindu	1991 · WGPSN
Doro Macula	Doro, Nanais people of Siberia	1991 · WGPSN
Kikimora Maculae	Kikimora, Slavic	1991 · WGPSN
Namazu Macula	Namazu, Japanese	1991 · WGPSN
Rem Maculae	Rem, Egyptian	1991 · WGPSN
Viviane Macula	Viviane, British	1991 · WGPSN
Zin Maculae	Zin, Niger	1991 · WGPSN

== Paterae (irregular craters) ==
Tritonian paterae are named after sacred waters and sea monsters from various mythologies.

Patera	Named after	Name approved (Date · Ref)
Dilolo Patera	Lago Dilolo, Angola	1991 · WGPSN
Gandvik Patera	Gandvik, Norse	1991 · WGPSN
Kasu Patera	Lake Kasu, Zoroastrianism	1991 · WGPSN
Kibu Patera	Kibu Island, Mabuiag people of Melanesia	1991 · WGPSN
Leviathan Patera	Leviathan, Hebrew	1991 · WGPSN

== Planitiae (plains) ==
Tritonian plains are named after watery realms in various mythologies.

Planitia	Named after	Name approved (Date · Ref)
Ruach Planitia	Ruach, French	1991 · WGPSN
Ryugu Planitia	Ryūgū, Japanese	1991 · WGPSN
Sipapu Planitia	Sipapu, Pueblo	1991 · WGPSN
Tuonela Planitia	Tuonela, Finnish	1991 · WGPSN

== Plana (plateaus) ==
Tritonian plateaus are named after legendary islands.

Planum	Named after	Name approved (Date · Ref)
Abatos Planum	Abatos, Egyptian	1991 · WGPSN
Cipango Planum	Cipangu, Marco Polo's name for Japan	1991 · WGPSN
Medamothi Planum	Medamothi, French	1991 · WGPSN

== Plumes ==
Volcanic plumes on Triton are named after water spirits in various mythologies.

Plume	Named after	Name approved (Date · Ref)
Hili	Hili, Zulu	1991 · WGPSN
Mahilani	Mahilani, Tongan	1991 · WGPSN

== Regiones (regions) ==
Tritonian regions are named after images from various mythologies.

Regio	Named after	Name approved (Date · Ref)
Bubembe Regio	Bubembe Island, Baganda people of Uganda	1991 · WGPSN
Monad Regio	Monad, Chinese	1991 · WGPSN
Uhlanga Regio	Uhlanga, Zulu	1991 · WGPSN

== Sulci ==
Sulci are long, parallel grooves. Tritonian sulci are named after sacred rivers in the mythology of various cultures.

Sulci	Named after	Name approved (Date · Ref)
Bia Sulci	Bia River (Yoruba)	1991 · WGPSN
Boynne Sulci	River Boyne (Celtic)	1991 · WGPSN
Ho Sulci	Huang He (Chinese)	1991 · WGPSN
Kormet Sulci	Körmt River (Norse)	1991 · WGPSN
Leipter Sulci	Leipter River (Norse)	1991 · WGPSN
Lo Sulci	Luo River (Chinese)	1991 · WGPSN
Ob Sulci	Ob River (Ostiak)	1991 · WGPSN
Ormet Sulci	Örmt River (Norse)	1991 · WGPSN
Slidr Sulci	Sliðr River (Norse)	1991 · WGPSN
Tano Sulci	Tano River (Yoruba)	1991 · WGPSN
Vimur Sulci	Vimur River (Norse)	1991 · WGPSN
Yasu Sulci	Yasu River (Japanese)	1991 · WGPSN

== See also ==
- Geology of Triton
