= Mua people =

Indigenous Australian Torres Strait Island people

Mua people (Mualgal) alternatively the Moa, are an Indigenous Australian Torres Strait Island people based on Moa (Banks Island). According to Alfred Cort Haddon their lifestyle, culture, myths and kinship networks overlapped closely with those of the Kaurareg on neighbouring Muralag, while also forming an integral part, linguistically and culturally, with all Western and Central Island peoples of Torres Strait.

== Language ==
They speak a dialect of Kalaw Lagaw Ya of the Pama-Nyungan language family.

== Mythology ==
According to the Mua, fire was brought to the island by Waleku, the frilled-necked lizard augadh (totem), which had travelled up to Mawatta in Papua to get the fire.

On death, one became a mari, a potentially dangerous spirit because it had not yet left for Kibukuth "Horizon's End", the world of the ancestral spirits over the western horizon. Then, with a community death "festival", the markai thaay (now called the Kulagudpudai "Tombstone Opening", the mari, envisaged as a spirit with feathers on its head, was free to travel to Bœigu (Boigu) in northwest Torres Strait, accompanied by markai who had come to take them home to the Augadh's gœgaith (clan land) in Kibukuth, leaving from Bœigu Gœwath (inlet) on northwest Mua. At Bœigu (the island) it might speak to or otherwise leave a message for the marimulaimœbaigal "ghost talkers", Bœigu men with the power (wœnewœn) to talk to the ghosts, to tell them how they died. The mari was then taken by its markai relatives towards the west, transforming into a markai "ancestral spirit" at a specific sand bar just west of Bœigu. The group then travelled by markai gul "markai sailing canoe/ship" on to Kibukuth over the western horizon. Two other markai spirit forms were buk and padutu; these were fertility and life spirits. Particular areas of an island were thought to be inhabited by dhogai (devil women) or adhiadh (giants).

== Ecology ==
Mua island, lying east of Badu (Mulgrave Island), is dominated by Mt Augustus, also known as Mua Pad (Mua Peak), with its twin boulders (Baudhar), the highest peak in the Torres Strait. Archaeological evidence points to habitation on Mua since the mid-late first millennium. The poor quality of the soil is explained by a myth which has the culture hero Gelam gathering up the best soil and foodstuffs and, on a dugong canoe, abandoning Mua to travel over and settle east, on the island of Mer. The quality of its soil is poor and the local vegetation thin, while swamps and mangroves are characteristic of the littoral zone. Notwithstanding this low fertility, Mua afforded a notable variety of fruit and tubers: aubau (noni fruit); goegoebe (bellfruit); kawai (red wild apple), kupa (white apple); mai a red fruit baked in oven pits (amai); putit (yellow cherry); sizoengai (black fruit); uzu (white island fig); wanga (a plum-dized black fruit); wangai (island plum) and yararkakur (monkeynut); kurub (varieties of island banana), and six varieties of yam: buwa, kuthai, gabau, mapet, sari and thapan. They also cooked a seed-pod (biyu sama) harvested from mangroves.

The timing of the foraging and hunting cyclea depended on the seasons. Specialists among the elders, the zugubaumœbaig or star gazer, determined by close observation of the heavens, the rhythms of the tides and seasons, governed by the Zugub (plural Zugubal), the pre-Christian Sky Gods, who oversaw the seasons, fertility, horticulture, hunting and food gathering, battle and headhunting in conjunction with the dhogai, and who became specific stars and constellations The onset of the south-east season is signaled by the dawn rising of the Yam Star (Kek, a senior Zugub) over Baudhar.

Men would fish beyond the shores for many kinds of fish, including Black spinefoot, parrot fish, dugong, turtle and crayfish, or shot the Torresian pigeons (goeinaw) using a variety of weapons: wap (harpoon spear, such as the thoelu wap fashioned from bloodwood), amu (harpoon rope), gabagaba (a club with a round stone head). Women could fish inshore, near reefs, using a wali line woven from the dhani (wild fig), or scouring the shoreline for Hawksbill turtle eggs (which however they were forbidden to eat during lactation), and the akul, goba and silel varieties of shellfish. Only after menopause were women allowed to partake of goeinau pigeon flesh.

== Social structure ==
Like other Torres Strait island cultures, Mua society was ruled by a gerontocracy of male elders, often maidhalgal (men of magic) whose mastery of magical techniques and lore was fundamental to the regulation of both social groups and the natural increase in foods. They lived part of the year in solitude, or with a few select assistants, directed the initiation rites at sacred ceremonial grounds (kod), and were reputed shapeshifters, reminiscent of shamans, capable of coercing both nature and men through sorcery, through secret herbal lore and the manipulating of effigies (wauri).

Before the white presence made itself felt, Barbara Thompson related that the Mua were divided into two distinct groups, differentiated by accent and slight dialect differences; the Mualgal and the Italgal. Whether this binome represents a moiety division, or of the confluence of two originally distinct peoples, is unknown; however, the gœgaith "clanland" layout of Mua suggests that the Mualgal were the Kursi Augadh people (see below).

Mualgal Hill people of Mua; Naigayidœgam (North Eastern)	Italgal Rock oyster (it) Mua; Zeydœgam (South and Western Coast)

As in general with the Western Torres Isles cultural complex, territory on Mua was quadripartite within two moities, the Kursi-Kœdal moiety and the Dhangal-Thabu moiety, each buwai "clan" having subclans, making over 10 totemic subclans (Note: This is a list of the 10 totems recorded by Haddon and Rivers in 1904 for Mua.: Baidham shark; Dhangal dugong; Kaigas shovel-nosed ray; Koedal crocodile; Kursi hammerhead shark; Tabu snake; Thupimul stingray; Umai dog; Kula stone; Tolupai a species of ray) (buwai) of patrilineal descent: the basic unit consisted of roughly 25 members. Each clan had its augadh or totemic kindred spirit. The 4 dominant clans correlate with wind directions, which the subclans of each share; moreover, they are represented by a Zugub star or constellation, of which Kek is the Zugub star of the southwest clan.

Dhangal (buwai) Dugong; Direction:NW Mua; Sites: Gerain &Totalai	Koedal (buwai) Crocodile; Direction SW Mua; Sites: Arkai & Iki
Kursi (buwai) Hammerhead shark Direction NE Mua; Site: Sigan	Tabu (buwai) Snake; Direction: SE Mua; Site: It (Note: Ōshima's group obtained a slightly different result- with Koedal in the NW; Kaigas (shovel-nosed ray) SE, and Kursi SW.)

== Warfare and inter island relations ==
The Mua were traditional feudal enemies of the Badu people and their allies, the Mabuiag people of the Bellevue island of Mabuiag, despite otherwise being closely related, speaking the same overall language, and engaging in regular inter-Island trading and inter-Island clan business. The two groups appeared to have engaged in a cycle of feuds, whose aim was not conquest, but rather revenge, with some acquisition of women and the accumulation, via headhunting, of skulls for trade and as trophies. Everyday life on Mua, like all the islands, was never free of a wariness driven by fear of being attacked by sea raiders.

There was no warrior class, and while all youths (kernge) underwent three stages of an initiatory trajectory, there was one social role, that of the paudhau garka, 'man of peace', exempt from warfare and with a role of negotiation peace between feuding clans.

The Mua people armed themselves for warfare with a kalak (spear) and kubai (spear-thrower), sometimes a dagal (a two or three-pronged spear), sometimes a nai (small club), a gabagaba "disk club made from gòba stone", and bows and arrows. Heads were decapitated with an upi "bamboo knife". One was reluctant to fight without the presence of the relevant emblem representing either one's totem or specialkœubu maidh "battle magic" (augadh) worn by a warrior.

In 1870 the Mabuigalgal raided the Mua twice on revenge raids: 20 Italgal died in the first attack alone. After the second assault, coordinated with and instigated by the Badu, the casualties were significantly higher. The estimated 250 Muans of 1875 were reduced to no more than 50 within 2 decades through the effects of pearler seizures of womenfolk and epidemics like measles.

Mua death rites were like those of the Kaurareg and all other Western and Central Islanders of Torres Strait. After the death of the person, a thœrba "funeral feast" was held; all death rite matters being managed by the marigeth "ghost hand", the in-law family of the deceased. Some months after, the markai thaay(see above) was held tocelebrate the return of the mari (soul) to its totemic homeland in Kibukuth (see above). After death, the body was laid on a high sara "rack", a mortuary bier raised on four legs so as to avoid harm from dogs and pigs. It was left there until decomposition had stripped the flesh from the bones. The latter were rubbed with red ochre, gathered within a bark sheath and buried in a sand mound surrounded by shells, skulls and dugong bones. The practice of tinting the bones with red ochre is atypical of the Torres Straits mortuary customs, and may have been introduced to the Mua via the Kaurareg from aboriginal usages in the Cape York Peninsula, though is also known in Papua New-Guinea.

== History ==
If the Mua are part of the Kauraraiga (this word simply means "islander"), their origins would overlap with the latter. The legendary lore of the area states that the Kauraraiga were originally the Hiámu/Hiámo/Hiáma (the Kiwai name) from Iama, one of the Bourke Isles north-east of Mua, who had settled on Daru off the coast of New Guinea south of the Fly River so as to be closer to their trading partners and clansmen of the East Trans Fly Bine and Wipi peoples, and who were eventually driven away by colonising and marauding Kiwai as these latter migrated westwards. The Hiámo sailed south to Muri (Mt Adolphus), then Waiben (Thursday Island), joining with Islanders already living there and Mua.

The first mention of Mua in European records goes back to William Bligh's entry in the logbook of HMS Bounty, dated 11 September 1792, noting its high mountain. Bligh named it Banks Island in honour of Sir Joseph Banks. To the Mua, as for other Torres islanders, white people seemed to be markai (the ghosts of released spirits) whose return was forbidden.

By 1870, due to successive onslaughts by the Badu and Mabuiag, the surviving remnants of the Mua had been driven off their coasts, inland. A settlement with missionaries was established in 1871.

== Sources ==
- Haddon, Alfred Cort (2011) [First published 1912]. "Weapons and objects employed in warfare". In Rivers, W. H. R.; Haddon, Alfred Cort (eds.). Reports of the Cambridge Anthropological Expedition to Torres Straits. Vol. 4. Cambridge University Press. pp. 173–203. ISBN 978-0-521-17988-1.
- Lawrence, David (2004). "Shared Space: Papuan Perspectives on the Torres Strait". In Davis, Richard (ed.). Woven Histories, Dancing Lives: Torres Strait Islander Identity, Culture and History. Aboriginal Studies Press. pp. 190–205. ISBN 978-0-855-75432-7.
- Moore, David R. (1979). Islanders and Aborigines at Cape York. Australian Institute of Aboriginal Studies. ISBN 978-0-855-75082-4.
- Ōshima, Jōji [in Japanese] (1983). Ōshima, Jōji (ed.). トレス海峡の人々―その地理学的・民族学的研究 (in Japanese). 古今書院. ISBN 978-4-772-21191-8.
- Rivers, W. H. R.; Haddon, Alfred Cort (1904). "Totemism". Reports of the Cambridge Anthropological Expedition to Torres Straits. Vol. 5. Cambridge University Press. ISBN 978-0-855-75082-4.
- Shnukal, Anna (2008a). "Traditional Mua" (PDF). Memoirs of the Queensland Museum. 4 (2): 7–33.
- Shnukal, Anna (2008b). "The Last Battle of Mua: Eleven Texts" (PDF). Memoirs of the Queensland Museum. 4 (2): 35–59.
- Shnukal, Anna (2008c). "Historical Mua" (PDF). Memoirs of the Queensland Museum. 4 (2): 61–295.
