= Badu people =

Aboriginal Australian people

Badu people are an Indigenous Australian group of Torres Strait Island people based on the central-west Badu island.

== Language ==
The language traditionally spoken by the Badu people and their Mabuiag neighbours is Kala Lagaw Ya, a member of the Pama-Nyungan language family.

== Ecology ==
Badu, together with Moa Island to its West from which it is separated by a narrow channel, is one of the largest in the Torres Strait. Circular in form, roughly 6 kilometres in diameter it is surrounded by complex tides that can run up to 7 knots. Generally sparsely wooded, and rocky, the northern part of the island is fringed with dense mangroves.

== Headhunting ==
Badu Island in particular, with the publication of Ion Idriess's novel The Wild White Man of Badu (1950), gained a reputation as an island of headhunters, though the practice was widespread throughout the Torres Strait. Taking the head of one's enemy was a ritual practice, involving a cane hoop and a special bamboo knife (upi) for severing the head, then boiling it and dressing it with beeswax noses and eyes fashioned from nautilus nacre.

== History ==
Willem Janszoon in Duyfken as early as 1605 sailed close to the island of Badu while en route back to the East Indies after a reconnaissance of New Guinea for the Dutch East India Company. The impression left of the region was of a waste land populated by cruel savages. The island itself, together with Mabuiagm was later charted by William Bligh.

Badu islanders murdered three Europeans from Thomas Lord, which had anchored off the island while searching for trepang in June 1846.

== Notable people ==
=== Sports ===
- David Fifita, rugby league footballer
- Dane Gagai, rugby league footballer
- Tallisha Harden, rugby league footballer
- Brenko Lee, rugby league footballer
- Edrick Lee, rugby league footballer
- Treymain Spry, rugby league footballer
