= Kulilu =

Mesopotamian mythological figure

In Babylonian mythology, Kulilu is a destructive spirit, half man, half fish.
