= Mah Cavus =

Depression on Triton, moon of Neptune

Mah Cavus is a cavi on Triton, a Neptunian moon.

== Geography ==
It is located at 38.0° N 6.0° E, and it is included in lots of studies on Triton's geomorphology alongside other geologic features like Kulilu Cavus.

Kuilu Cavus & Kasu Patera are nearby.

== Naming ==
It was named in 1991 after Mah, a fish which holds up the entire universe in Persian myth
