= Mazomba =

Mythological fish

Mazomba is a giant fish in the mythology of the Chaga people of Tanzania. It is also the name of a crater on Triton, a moon of Neptune.
