= Ravgga =

God in Sami mythology

Ravgga is a fortune-telling fish god in Sami mythology.
