= Mabuiag =

Indigenous Australian group

The Mabuyag (plural Mabuygilgal) are an Indigenous Australian group of Torres Strait Islander people united by a common language, strong ties of kinship and survived as skilled hunter–fisher–gatherers and horticulturalists in family groups or clans living on and around Mabuiag Island, in Torres Strait in Queensland, Australia. They are ethnically Melanesian.

They in common with all Torres Strait Islanders had a mixed reputation for hostility as well as eagerness to develop trading links with outsiders before they became Christian over the 1870s. The language of the island is Gœmulgaw Ya, alt. Mabuygilgaw Ya, a dialect of Kala Lagaw Ya.

The society consists of two moieties, the Koey Buway "Senior Buway" and Moegi Buway, "Junior Buway"; the terms relate to the senior (older brother) and junior (younger brother) leaders of the Zugubal "Sky Gods". The Moegi Buway include The Mabuygilgal of Wagedagam ("Rear-Side") on the northwest (kukidagam) side of Mabuyaagi (their totem wind and direction) and the Goemulgal of the mid-South-East side, while the Koey Buway include the Mabuygilgal of Panay-Dabangay ("Near-Side") on the north-east side (naygayidagam) and the Kaygas (shovel-nose "shark") people of the south-west (zeydoegam).

== Mythology ==
One of the great culture heroes of the Mabuyaagi people was Kuyam (alt. Kuiam, Kwoiam). He was described as having a long, narrow head with both a bulging brow and a protuberant occipital lobe, capped by a high crown. Paradoxically, these are the features the Mabuiag associated with the mainland Australian Aborigines they occasionally encountered, a people they otherwise despised. Further, the Mabuiag identify the origins of Kuyam with Cape York: Kuyama, Kuyam's father, armed only with a spear and woomera, followed a downdrift of blades of grass northwards from Kuuku Ya'u territory on north-east Cape York, walked across the sea and set foot on Mabuyaagi in Dugong buway territory (north-east Mabuyaagi), where he married Kuinama, of the South-West Goemu people, though she was originally from Muri. Unable to accept their ways, Kuyamu then returned to Australia. His abandoned wife gives birth to a son who she called Kyuam (Kuyama), who taught himself how to use his father's woomera and spear. When one day his aged, half-blind mother, failing to recognise him, cursed him for stepping on the strands she was using to weave a mat, he stabbed her eyes and mouth with a three-pronged spear, and runs amok on head-hunting raids on Boigu, mainland Papua, and back, until he was finally on Mabuyaagi killed by warriors from Moa. He was not beheaded, a typical part of Torres Strait headhunting culture; famous warriors were not beheaded. However, Kuyam was one of a few Culture Heros, others including Wayath and Amipuru.

== History ==
Mabuaig Island, along with many other islands of Torres Strait, was annexed by the State of Queensland in 1879, giving the Queensland Government control over the east-west shipping passage through the Torres Strait, plus some control over movements between Papua and Australia. Before the legal recognition of native title indigenous land ownership was assumed to be non-existent, and therefore the Mabuiag people, who maintained continual buwai-based land holding ownership patterns, were in legal limbo, with no traditional rights recognised, but also no citizenship rights either.

However, the traditional ownership patterns were unofficially recognised by various European officials. For example, when the Acting Government Resident, Hugh Milman, who was based at Thursday Island), visited Mabuiag Island in 1886 he reported that: "there is no doubt that every acre has a reputed owner, that every grove or single tree of any value has its proper and legitimate hereditary owner.

After the federation of Australia in 1901, Torres Strait Islanders including the people of Mabuaig island became subject to "protection", and it was not until well after World War Two, in the 1960s, that they could get married or travel to mainland Australia or other islands without Queensland Department of Aboriginal and Islander Affairs (DAIA) approval.

Since that time, while many are often absent working in industries such as Torres Strait Islander fisheries (pearling industry, crayfishing, etc.) or have moved to Badu Island, Thursday Island, or mainland Australia, some (now estimated at approximately 250) have continued and continuously held on to their traditional tenure ("native title") occupying, using, and enjoying the island and its surrounds in a manner prescribed by traditional law and custom.

People gathered... on this island, like their ancestors before them, have occupied it and maintained the connection with it for hundreds of years. Today they continue to speak their traditional language, they practise fishing, hunting and collecting and in doing that, they make use of the specialised historical knowledge accumulated over centuries. They perform customary dances and songs, they manage sacred sites. They utilise their traditional kinship system to organise social and economic life. They are in all respects the owners of this land. (Page 9))

== Local lore ==
The home seas, islands, and reefs occupied, used, and criss-crossed by the people of Mabuiag Island for many generations, have been described as follows:

What first appear to be undifferentiated patches of coral and salt water are Islanders' exclusive marine domains - a vast, intricate water library where history dwells in places, not in time, and all the sea is named. Islands, reefs, channels and the resources they contain belong to.. Mabuiag people because mythical ancestors like Sesere, Zigin, and Wad caught turtles, dugong, or fish there

The people of Mabuiag Island, for instance, believe their afterworld lies in Kibu to their northwest. It is believed that when an Islander dies, their mari (life spirit) first goes to Boigu, leaves word for the Boigu marimulaimabaigal spirit talkers to report how they died, and then becomes a markai (heavenly spirit) and sails to Kibu at sundown with the prevailing winds

If the spirit of the deceased cannot join other ancestors at Kibu, they may stay and cause problems among the living. Before the arrival of missionaries, when someone died, the people of Mabuiag, as was the case for all other Islanders and neighbouring Papuans, would assist the deceased into Kibu by performing a mortuary ritual consisting of sacred dances and feasting at a particular point a few weeks after the death of the person. The arrangements for the rituals and feast were always carried out by the marigeth spirit-hand, the special term used for the in-laws, whose responsibility this was.

Subsequent to the arrival of missionaries, this original commemoration has been Christianised as the Kulaw Gudpudai tombstone opening. The important pre-Christian tradition still exist, only those with clearly pagan meaning being disused or disguised in various ways. The role of the marigeth is still very important: 'in-laws dig deep into their pockets to present the deceased's family with an engraved headstone, brought all the way from Cairns, Townsville or even Brisbane, shrouded in hundreds of yards of colorful cloth and money envelopes'.

Within Mabuaig Island local lore, families may only exercise control over land and sea rights around Mabuaig Island if children have island residences and if relatives can be guaranteed a proper tombstone opening. Migration away from the island complicates people's ability to carry out these burial practices (above), and makes it difficult for the descendants of people living away from Mabuaig Island to establish legal title to family estates.

== Amenities ==
The Torres Strait Island Regional Council operate the Ngalpun Ngulaygaw Lag Resource Centre in Main Street.

The Mabuiag Indigenous Knowledge Centre (IKC), named Ngalpun Ngulaygaw Lag Resource Centre, is the oldest IKC operated by Torres Strait Island Regional Council. Opened 9 August 2002 to provide library services to the island community, the IKC has partnered with State Library of Queensland to deliver many programs and projects over the years. Two of these projects include Away with Words (2008) and Culture Love (2010). Culture Love was a continuation of Away with Words and led to the creation of a digital story, retelling Amipuru, one of the myths recorded in Margaret Lawrie's book, Myths and Legends of Torres Strait. In the Away with Words workshop, local children created artwork based on the Amipuru. In the Culture Love workshop, the children created clay sculptures, images, and recorded animated story in the local Kalaw Lagaw Ya language.

== Notable people ==
The notable Torres Strait Islander singer of "My Island Home", Christine Anu, descended from the Mabuiag people, as well as the people of Saibai Island).

== See also ==
- Mabuiag language
