= Mabuiag Island =

- Town
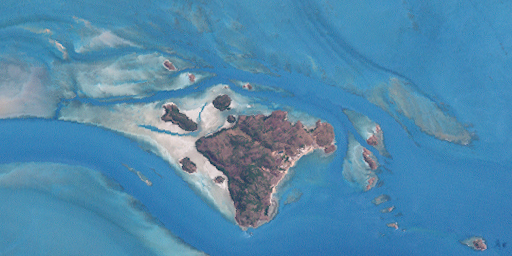
- Landsat image of the Bellevue Islands, with Mabuiag in the centre

- Interactive map of Mabuiag Island
- Coordinates: 9.9535°S 142.1922°E
- Country: Australia
- State: Queensland
- LGA: Torres Strait Island Region
- Location: 23 km (14 mi) N of Badu Island (direct); 30 km (19 mi) NNW of Moa Island (direct); 69 km (43 mi) N of Thursday Island (direct); 863 km (536 mi) NNW of Cairns (direct); 2,247 km (1,396 mi) NNW of Brisbane (direct)

Government
  - State electorate: Cook
  - Federal division: Leichhardt

Area
  - Total: 6.3 km^{2} (2.4 sq mi)

Population
  - Total: 253 (SAL 2021)
- Time zone: UTC+10:00 (AEST)
- Postcode: 4875
Localities around Mabuiag Island
Torres Strait	Torres Strait	Torres Strait
Torres Strait	Mabuiag Island	Torres Strait
Torres Strait	Badu Island	Moa Island

Mabuiag, also known as "Mabuyag" and natively "Mabuyaagi", formerly "Jervis Island") is one of the Torres Strait Islands in Queensland, Australia. Mabuiag is also a town and locality in the Torres Strait Island Region local government area. In the 2021 census, the locality of Mabuiag Island had a population of 253 people with 94.1% identifying as Indigenous Australians.

== Geography ==
The island is in the Bellevue Islands group, 100 kilometres (62 mi) north of Thursday Island in the Napoleon Passage and Arnolds Passage of the Torres Strait. It has other traditional names as well, such as Gœmu (strictly speaking the name of the South-East part of Mabuiag).

This island is one of the Torres Strait Islands, originally named by Captain William Bligh, "Jervis Island", and so labelled on early English language maps.

== History ==
Archaeological excavations have shown that people arrived on Mabuiag at least 7300 years ago. During this period, Islanders were able to survive by fishing and hunting dugong. The island continued to be occupied by small communities for the subsequent 5000 years, with pottery (usually associated with Melanesian peoples) found at two sites, Mui (East coast of Mabuiag) and Mask Cave (on adjacent islet, Pulu) dating from approximately 2000 years ago. The past 1000 years witnessed expansion in site use, including formation of multiple ethnographically-significant 'villages', including Gœmu, Wagedœgam and Dhabangay. During the past 400–500 years large, highly structured mounds of dugong bone, as well as shell and stone arrangements provide evidence for emerging totemic divisions

The "Footprints before me – Torres Strait Island Missions and Communities" webpage tells the following history of Mabuiag Island and the people living there.

Kala Lagaw Ya (more correctly Kalaw Lagaw Ya (KLY) and Gœmulgaw Ya) is one of the languages of the Torres Strait. Kalaw Lagaw Ya is the traditional language of the Western and Central islands of the Torres Strait. The Kalaw Lagaw Ya language region includes the territory within the local government boundaries of the Torres Shire Council.

Kalaw Lagaw Ya, alt. Gœmulgaw Ya, is specifically the dialect of Mabuyaagi (Mabuiag) and Badhu (Badu), there not being a traditional name for the language as a whole. Kalaw Lagaw Ya is used in academic literature as a cover term for the whole language, and is one of the two indigenous languages of Torres Strait; in earlier works it was also called Mabuiag. The Gœmulgaw Ya region includes the island territory of Mabuiag within the local government boundaries of the Torres Shire Council and Mabuiag Island Council and by extension Badhu.

In 1606, Luís Vaz de Torres sailed through, and navigated, Torres Strait islands, along New Guinea's southern coast.

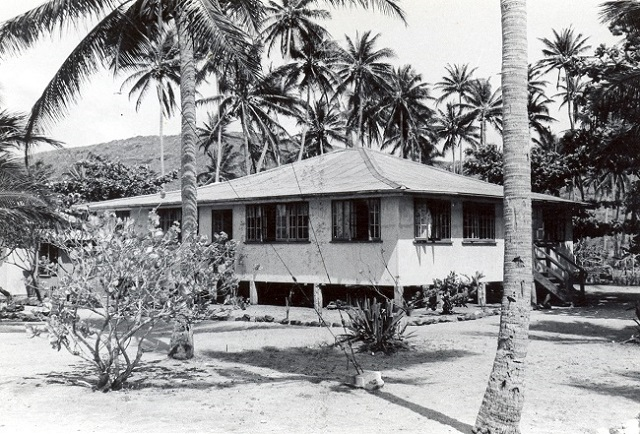
The government teacher's residence

"The Mabuiag people had a reputation for hostility to outsiders until their acceptance of Christianity in the early 1870s. In 1877 the mission moved to Bau where the water supply was better. Later, the missionaries persuaded the people to join them at Bau, which became the main settlement. By 1898, Mabuiag people were labouring on pearling luggers for wages, while many followed work to Thursday Island and further to the mainland. An official presence on Mabuiag began during the mid-1920s when Queensland Government posted teachers there. An Island Industries Board store opened in 1946".

Mabuiag Island State School opened on 29 January 1985. On 1 January 2007, the school became the Maubuiag Island campus of Tagai State College, an amalgamation of 17 Torres Strait Island schools.

== Demographics ==
In the 2016 census, the locality of Mabuiag Island had a population of 210 people with 97.2% identifying as Indigenous.

In the 2021 census, the locality of Mabuiag Island had a population of 253 people with 94.1% identifying as Indigenous.

== Transportation ==
Mabuiag Island Airport is in the east of the island (9.9502°S 142.1953°E). The runway at is only 450 metres (1,480 ft) long, making it the shortest in Australian for commercial services.

== Amenities ==
The Torres Strait Islands Regional Council operates an Indigenous Knowledge Centre with public library facilities on Main Street, known as Ngalpun Ngulaygaw Lag Resource Centre 'Our Place of Learning'.

== Education ==
Tagai State College has 17 campuses throughout the Torres Strait. Its Mabuiag Island campus (Mabuygiw Ngurpay Lag) provides primary (Early Childhood-6) education at School Street (9.9546°S 142.1895°E).

There are no secondary schools on the island. The nearest government secondary school is Tagai State College on Thursday Island.

== Security issues ==
On 5 February 2008, after working on the island for a couple of months, a 27-year-old nurse from New South Wales was attacked and raped in her sleeping quarters by a resident of the island; previously, she had frequently emailed her superiors on Thursday Island about the lack of adequate security on the island. The incident prompted a review of security on the island and an inquiry into the sexual attack was launched by the Government of Queensland. In February 2009, more than a year after it had begun, the inquiry's findings had still not been released, while the alleged rapist, Dennis Kris, 23, was on bail before being due to be sentenced later that year.

On Monday, 16 August 2010, Dennis William Kris pleaded guilty in the Cairns District Court to rape, unlawfully entering a dwelling to commit an indictable offence and unlawfully entering a dwelling at night with intent. Judge William Everson sentenced Kris to six years' jail on the first count, three years on the second, one year on the third, to be served concurrently. Everson ordered, however, that as Kris had spent 785 days in pre-sentence custody, he could apply for immediate parole. Kris's mother worked at the medical centre on Mabuiag. Kris stole keys to the centre and sleeping quarters from his mother's briefcase. He let himself into the facility late at night where he attacked the sleeping woman. He and several friends then stayed outside the facility until daylight, calling out to and mocking the victim. Kris had disabled the nurse's telephone while he was in the building so she could not call for assistance. When the nurse called her Queensland Health superiors on Thursday Island the morning after the rape, she was told to "put it behind you and get back to work". The nurse left the island that day to seek medical help; Queensland Health immediately stopped her pay – it was only reinstated when the details were published in The Australian.

In April 2010, a Magistrates' Court was opened on the island for the first time. The court is part of the Torres Strait Court Circuit which is conducted on various islands in the Torres Strait on a rotational basis.

== See also ==
External videos
- Mask (Buk), Torres Strait, Mabuiag Island, Smarthistory

- List of islands of Australia
- List of Torres Strait Islands
- Mabuiag Island Airport
- Mabuiag people
