= Amarum =

Spirit in Ecuadorian Quechua mythology

In the mythology of the Quechua people of Ecuador, Amarum is a spirit in the shape of a water boa that bring rain.
