= Kibu =

In the mythology of the Western and Central Torres Strait Islanders, Kibukuth "Horizon's End" (abbreviated form Kibu) is the mythical land of the ancestoral spirits and the awgadhal "totemic gods", believed to exist beyond the sky dome (dapar) surrounding the world, with its main entrance over the horizon far to the west.

== Meaning ==
The basic meaning of the word kibu is midpoint of an upright broad object, such as small of back, mid-slope of a hill, and horizon. The world is envisaged as like an upturned half-coconut shell (a hemisphere) with the bottom part being the earth covered by the overarching sky.

== Features ==
The common reference of Kibukuth, and its abbreviation Kibu to the land of the markai (the spirits of people who have travelled to Kibu after death) is a specialised, religious use of the word. Traditional Torres Strait religion can be characterised as totemic with a form ancestor worship, and as such the markai are the ancestors, and are specially revered. Kibukuth is made up of different totemic territories, those of kœdal "crocodile", thabu "snake", baidham "shark", samu "cassowary", kursi "hammer-head shark", dhœibaw "wild white yam", among many others. After death, the mari "soul" travels to Boigu, just past which it becomes a markai, and is met by markai relatives who have come to take it to the augadh territory. The augadh generates the buwai "totemic clan/moiety".

In the traditional mythology, the world (arkath "hole/pit", apagoewa "underfurrow/ditch/garden", guguwabthiyaizinga "coiled-up abject", sama "food ball") is at the bottom of a hemi-sphere, with the sky-dome (dapar) above and around it. The markai live in Kibukuth "Horizons End", the main gateway of which is in the west. However, the markai often come back to visit. Kibukuth actually surrounds the world, so markai can be seen passing from east to west as well as west to east, coming down from the sky, and sometimes even coming up from under the ground via Apangab "Netherway/Underway", the mythical pathway under the earth used by markai and others, such as dhogai "long-eared witch women", maidhalaig "magic-men", and others to travel under the earth and the sea from place to place.

Before becoming markai, the spirit is called a mari. Mari are the souls of people while still alive ort just after death. The passage to the other side is made on sand banks just west of Boigu, in north-west Torres Strait. At Boigu, the mari either leave a sign or otherwise talk to the mariumulaimœbaig "spirit talker", to let people know how he or she died, and if he or she was murdered (and if so, who killed them). This is done where the cemetery is at Boigu, just west of the village. Previously, the mari of certain buwai did this at Thuwam, another sacred site in western Boigu.

== Kibukuth and relations with other peoples ==
In the passage over to the other side, at the sandbanks west of Boigu, the mari, which is black (kubikub) just as in life, becomes white (gamulnga) (this is a belief common to many Pacific and Australian peoples). Therefore, when Asians and Europeans visited Torres Strait, they were at first believed to be markai returning. In the modern language, markai is still often used to refer to Europeans, though no longer to Asians. However, this is considered to be impolite, and the correct term is either Yurupau Mœbaig "European" or Gamulmœbaig "(Light) Coloured Person".

One favourite means of transport of the markai is the markaigub "spirit wind", that is to say, waterspouts, which appear in the North-West Monsoon season, the favourite time for the markai to come to the world. As this was the season the Makkasarese and similar Indonesian fishermen came to Northern Australia, they were associated with the markai. Waterspouts are also called markaibaywa or markaibaw (diakect differences), or baaywa / baw for short; that is to say markai spear, baaywa/baw being a special word for spear. The markaibaywa are seen as the spears the markai use to hunt turtle and dugong.
