= List of islands by population =

This is a list of islands in the world ordered by population, which includes all islands with more than 100,000 people. For comparison, continental landmasses are also shown, in italics. The population of the world's islands is over 730 million, approximately 9% of the world's total population. Of those, only Java (Indonesia) and Honshu (Japan) have populations over 1% of the global population.

== Islands ordered by population ==
Due to the uncertainty of what exactly constitutes a geographic island, as opposed to an administrative region or a continent, please see comments about what is included in the figures: the statistics for some "islands" include other nearby islands.

World's most populated islands (10 million+ inhabitants)

Ranking	Island	Population	Density		Largest settlement	Countries
Ranking	Island	Population	per km^{2}	per sq mi	Largest settlement	Countries
–	Afro-Eurasia	6,729,986,135 (2020)	72.4	188	Pearl River Delta	Multiple (in Africa, in Asia, in Europe)
–	America (landmass)	1,027,067,740 (2020)	23.5	61	São Paulo	Multiple
1	Java	156,927,804 (2024)	1,196	3,100	Jakarta	Indonesia
2	Honshū	102,579,606 (2020)	449	1,160	Tokyo	Japan
3	Great Britain	66,344,800 (2023)	287	740	London	United Kingdom
4	Luzon	64,301,558 (2024)	480	1,200	Quezon City	Philippines
5	Sumatra	60,795,669 (2023)	125	320	Medan	Indonesia
6	Madagascar	31,964,956 (2024)	43.5	113	Antananarivo	Madagascar
7	Mindanao	27,384,138 (2024)	261.4	677	Davao City	Philippines
–	Australia (landmass)	25,294,065 (2021 estimate)	3.2	8.3	Sydney	Australia
8	Taiwan	23,865,820 (2021)	657	1,700	New Taipei City	Taiwan
9	Salsette	23,729,378 (2022)	24,414	63,230	Mumbai	India (Maharashtra)
10	Borneo	23,720,000 (2020, admin, prelim)	26.3	68	Samarinda	Indonesia (Kalimantan), Brunei, Malaysia (Sabah, Sarawak)
11	Hispaniola	22,278,000 (2020, national popclocks July 1)	277	720	Santo Domingo	Dominican Republic, Haiti
12	Sri Lanka	22,000,000 (2023)	310	800	Colombo	Sri Lanka
13	Sulawesi	20,568,411 (2023, admin, prelim)	97	250	Makassar	Indonesia
14	New Guinea	14,800,000 (2020 RI, admin, prelim, 2020 PNG est)	15	39	Port Moresby	Indonesia (Western New Guinea), Papua New Guinea
15	Kyūshū	12,346,465 (2020 census)	336	870	Fukuoka	Japan
16	Hainan	10,081,232 (2020)	290	750	Haikou	China (Hainan)
17	Cuba	10,055,968 (2023)	103.3	268	Havana	Cuba
18	Long Island	8,063,262 (2020)	2,262.37	5,859.5	Brooklyn	United States (New York)
19	Ireland	7,026,636 (2022)	77.8	202	Dublin	Republic of Ireland, United Kingdom (Northern Ireland)
20	Singapore Island	6,040,000 (2024)	7,704	19,950	Singapore	Singapore
21	Hokkaidō	5,214,795 (2020 census)	67	170	Sapporo	Japan (Hokkaidō)
22	Sicily	4,801,468 (2022)	190	490	Palermo	Italy (Sicily)
23	Negros	4,797,302 (2024)	331.7	859	Bacolod	Philippines
24	Panay	4,669,037 (2024)	358	930	Iloilo City	Philippines
25	Bali	4,461,260 (2024)	750	1,900	Denpasar	Indonesia (Bali)
26	Cebu	4,380,273 (2024)	670	1,700	Cebu City	Philippines (Cebu)
27	Madura	4,156,661 (2024)	744	1,930	Sampang	Indonesia (East Java)
28	North Island	4,067,400 (June 2025)	35.8	93	Auckland	New Zealand
29	Lombok	4,056,621 (2024)	763	1,980	Mataram	Indonesia (West Nusa Tenggara)
30	Shikoku	3,627,347 (2020 census)	198	510	Matsuyama	Japan
31	Puerto Rico	3,203,295 (2024)	350.8	909	San Juan	United States (Puerto Rico)
32	Timor	3,182,693 (2014)	107.6	279	Kupang	Indonesia (part of East Nusa Tenggara) and East Timor
33	Jamaica	2,950,210 (2015)	266	690	Kingston	Jamaica
34	Zhongshan	2,890,000 (2015)	1,784	4,620	Zhongshan	China (Guangdong and Macau)
35	Leyte	2,626,970 (2020)	324.2	840	Tacloban	Philippines
36	Zealand	2,409,950 (2025)	327.4	848	Copenhagen	Denmark
37	Xiamen Island	2,087,000 (2022 estimate). Data excludes the outlying island of Gulangyu.	11,848.4	30,687	Xiamen	China (Fujian)
38	Island of Montreal	2,014,221 (2016 estimate on 2011 census data)	4,022.3	10,418	Montreal	Canada (Quebec)
39	Flores	1,831,000 (2010)	122.2	316	Maumere	Indonesia (East Nusa Tenggara)
40	Haizhu	1,819,000 (2020 census)	19,890	51,500	Haizhu	China (Guangdong)
41	Bhola Island	1,758,000 (2011)	1,179.8	3,056	Bhola	Bangladesh (Barisal)
42	Samar	1,751,267 (2010)	140	360	Calbayog	Philippines
43	Manhattan Island	1,694,251 (2020)	28,873	74,780	New York City	United States (New York)
44	Sardinia	1,579,181 (2022)	69	180	Cagliari	Italy (Sardinia)
45	Sumbawa	1,391,340 (2014)	101.3	262	Bima	Indonesia (West Nusa Tenggara)
46	São Luís	1,381,459 (2014 estimate)	978	2,530	São Luís	Brazil (Maranhão)
47	Unguja (Zanzibar)	1,346,332 (2022 census)	866	2,240	Zanzibar City	Tanzania (Zanzibar)
48	Okinawa Island	1,335,733 (2020 census)	1,105	2,860	Naha	Japan (Okinawa)
49	Mindoro	1,331,473 (2015)	117.2	304	Calapan	Philippines
50	Hong Kong Island	1,270,876 (2021)	16,390	42,400	Eastern District	China (Hong Kong)
51	Cyprus	1,268,437 (2024 estimate)	136	350	Nicosia	Cyprus, Northern Cyprus (Recognised only by Turkey), United Kingdom (Akrotiri and Dhekelia)
52	Trinidad	1,267,145 (2011 census)	266	690	Chaguanas	Trinidad and Tobago
53	South Island	1,256,700 (June 2025)	8.3	21	Christchurch	New Zealand
54	Bahrain Island	1,221,849 (2025 estimate)	1,556	4,030	Manama	Bahrain
55	Mauritius	1,219,265 (2014)	618.24	1,601.2	Port Louis	Mauritius
56	Bohol	1,211,000 (2015)	290	750	Tagbilaran	Philippines (Bohol)
57	Nantai	1,169,000 (2022 estimate)	8,170	21,200	Cangshan	China (Fujian)
58	Batam	1,153,860 (2012 BPS Civil Survey)	750	1,900	Batam	Indonesia (Riau Islands)
59	Bangka	1,146,581 (2020)	100	260	Pangkalpinang	Indonesia (Bangka Belitung)
60	Oʻahu	1,016,508 (2020)	657.9	1,704	Honolulu	United States (Hawaii)
61	Tenerife	927,993 (2021 estimate)			Santa Cruz	Spain (Canary Islands)
62	Mallorca	912,544 (2021 estimate)			Palma	Spain (Balearic Islands)
63	Palawan	886,308 (2015 census)			Puerto Princesa	Philippines (Palawan)
64	Vancouver Island	870,297 (2019 estimate)			Saanich	Canada (British Columbia)
65	Réunion	863,083 (2020 estimate)			Saint-Denis	France (Réunion)
66	Penang Island	860,000 (2010 estimate)			Central George Town	Malaysia (Penang)
67	Gran Canaria	852,688 (2021 estimate)			Las Palmas	Spain (Canary Islands)
68	Södertörn	797,234 (2014 estimate)			Stockholm (part of)	Sweden (Stockholm County)
69	São Vicente	760,000			Santos (insular area)	Brazil (São Paulo)
70	Nias	756,338 (2010 census)			Gunungsitoli	Indonesia (North Sumatra)
71	Masbate	706,897 (2015 census)			Masbate City	Philippines (Masbate)
72	Sumba	686,113 (2010 census)			Waingapu	Indonesia (East Nusa Tenggara)
73	Viti Levu	661,997 (2007 census)			Suva	Fiji
74	Bến Tre	657,813 (2019 census)			Bến Tre	Vietnam
75	Crete	623,065 (2011 census)			Heraklion	Greece (Crete)
76	Jeju	621,550 (2014 estimate)			Jeju City	South Korea (Jeju)
77	Chongming	615,297 (2013 census)			Chongming District	China (Shanghai)
78	Tasmania	542,000 (2021 estimate)			Hobart	Australia (Tasmania)
79	Jolo	530,000(2015 census)			Jolo	Philippines (Sulu)
80	Phuket	525,018 (2010)			Phuket	Thailand (Phuket)
81	Newfoundland	522,103 (2020 estimate)			St. John's	Canada (Newfoundland and Labrador)
82	New Britain	513,926 (2011 census)			Kimbe	Papua New Guinea
83	Zhoushan	502,667 (2000 census)			Zhoushan (part of)	China (Zhejiang)
84	Staten Island	495,747 (2020)			Staten Island	United States (New York)
85	Margarita Island	489,917 (2014 estimate)			Porlamar	Venezuela (Nueva Esparta)
86	Funen	478,986 (2025)			Odense	Denmark (South Denmark)
87	Sakhalin	471,515 (2014 estimate)			Yuzhno-Sakhalinsk	Russia (Sakhalin Oblast)
88	Mactan	467,824 (2015 census)			Lapu-Lapu City (excluding parts on Olango Island Group)	Philippines (Cebu)
89	Basilan	459,367 (2015 census)			Isabela	Philippines (Basilan)
90	Halmahera	449,938 (2010 Census)			Tobelo	Indonesia (North Maluku)
91	Buton	447,408 (2010 Census)			Baubau	Indonesia (Southeast Sulawesi)
92	Ambon	441,000 (2010 Census)			Ambon	Indonesia (Maluku)
93	Île Jésus	438,366 (2021 census)			Laval	Canada (Quebec)
94	Seram	434,113 (2010 census)			Masohi	Indonesia (Maluku)
95	IJsselmonde	423,000			Feijenoord	Kingdom of the Netherlands (Netherlands)
96	Santa Catarina	420,000			Florianópolis (part of)	Brazil (Santa Catarina)
97	Pemba	406,808 (2012 census)			Wete	Tanzania (Zanzibar)
98	Martinique	390,371 (2012 estimate)			Fort-de-France	France (Martinique)
99	Malta	386,057 (2011 estimate)			Qormi	Malta
100	Marajó	383,336 (2014 estimate)			Breves	Brazil (Pará)
101	Iceland	374,830 (2021 census—whole country)			Reykjavík	Iceland
102	Grande Comore	369,600 (2012 estimate)			Moroni	Comoros (Grande Comore)
103	Pingtan (Haitan)	357,760 (2010 census)			Tancheng	China (Fujian)
104	Ukerewe	345,147 (2012 census)			Nansio	Tanzania (Mwanza)
105	Flevopolder	344,521 (2018 estimate Flevoland w/o Noordoostpolder)			Almere	Kingdom of the Netherlands (Netherlands)
106	Bioko	339,695 (2015 census)			Malabo	Equatorial Guinea
107	Yangzhong	334,977 (2010 census)			Yangzhong (excluding Xilaiqiao)	China (Jiangsu)
108	Bintan	329,659 (2010 census)			Tanjungpinang	Indonesia (Riau Islands)
109	Maheshkhali	321,218 (2011 Census)			Moheshkhali Municipality	Bangladesh (Chittagong)
110	Corsica	316,578 (2012 estimate)			Ajaccio	France (Corsica)
111	Santo Amaro (Guarujá)	308,989 (2014 estimate)			Guarujá	Brazil (São Paulo)
112	Anjouan	306,800 (2012 estimate)			Mutsamudu	Comoros (Anjouan)
113	Vitória	300,000			Vitória (part of)	Brazil (Espírito Santo)
114	Vendsyssel-Thy	295,375 (2025)			Hjørring	Denmark (North Jutland)
115	Sandwip	292,773 (2001 census)			Sandwip Municipality	Bangladesh (Chittagong)
116	Hatiya	292,057 (2011 census)			Hatiya Municipality	Bangladesh (Chittagong)
117	Santiago	290,280 (2014 estimate)			Praia	Cape Verde
118	Idjwi	290,000			Bugarula	Democratic Republic of the Congo (South Kivu)
119	Abu Dhabi	280,385			Abu Dhabi (part of)	United Arab Emirates (Abu Dhabi)
120	Barbados	279,254 (2005 estimate)			Bridgetown	Barbados
121	Muna	268,140 (2010 census)			Raha	Indonesia (Southeast Sulawesi)
122	Belitung	262,357 (2010 census)			Tanjung Pandan	Indonesia (Bangka Belitung)
123	Madeira	247,933 (2022 INE estimate)			Funchal	Portugal (Madeira)
124	Grande Terre	247,669 (2014 estimate)			Nouméa	France (New Caledonia)
125	Geoje Island	241,711 (2010 census)			Geoje	South Korea (South Gyeongsang)
126	Bushrod	234,596 (1996)			New Kru Town	Liberia (Montserrado)
127	Bougainville	234,280 (2011 census)			Arawa	Papua New Guinea (Bougainville)
128	Raghopur	232,909 (2011 census)			Birpur	India (Bihar)
129	Marinduque	227,828 (2010)			Boac	Philippines (Marinduque)
130	Amager	225,746 (2025 census)			Amager Vest	Denmark (Capital Region)
131	Lulu Island	219,429 (Note: Population calculated by adding the population of Richmond, British Columbia (209,937) and Queensborough, New Westminster (10,311), then subtracting the population of Sea Island (British Columbia) (819).)			Richmond (excluding parts on minor islands)	Canada (British Columbia)
132	Lagos Island	212,700 (2006 census)			Lagos Island	Nigeria (Lagos)
133	Governador Island	212,574 (2010 census adm dist including nearby island)			Jardim Guanabara	Brazil (Rio de Janeiro)
134	New Providence	210,832 (2000 census)			Nassau	Bahamas (New Providence)
135	Euboea	210,815 (2011 census)			Chalcis	Greece (Central Greece)
136	Portsea Island	205,400			Portsmouth (part of)	United Kingdom (England)
137	Vasilievsky Island	202,650 (2002 census).			Vasileostrovsky District	Russia (Saint Petersburg)
138	Hawaii (island)	200,629 (2020)			Hilo	United States (Hawaii)
139	Grande-Terre	197,603 (2006 census)			Les Abymes	France (Guadeloupe)
140	New Ireland	194,067 (2011 estimate, whole province)			Kavieng	Papua New Guinea (New Ireland)
141	Tarakan	193,370 (2010 Census)			Tarakan	Indonesia (North Kalimantan)
142	Tsing Yi	191,500 (2015 projection)			Tsing Yi Town	China (Hong Kong)
143	Dongchong	191,019 (2010 census)			Dongchong	China (Guangdong)
144	Muharraq	188,597 (2010)			Muharraq	Bahrain (Muharraq)
145	Grande Terre	188,442 (2012 estimate)			Mamoudzou	France (Mayotte)
146	Chiloé	186,933 (2016P census)			Castro	Chile (Los Lagos)
147	Basse-Terre	186,661 (2006 census)			Pointe-à-Pitre	France (Guadeloupe)
148	Ternate	185,705 (2010 census)			Ternate	Indonesia (North Maluku)
149	Jinshazhou	183,000 (2010 census)			Jinsha Subdistrict	China (Guangdong)
150	South Andaman Island	181,949 (2001 census)			Srivijayapuram	India (Andaman and Nicobar Islands)
151	Tahiti	178,133 (2007 census)			Papeʻete	France (French Polynesia)
152	Vypin	176,567 (2011 census)			Njarakkal	India (Kerala)
153	Isla Grande de Tierra del Fuego	172,797			Río Grande	Argentina (Tierra del Fuego), Chile (Magallanes)
154	São Tomé	171,856 (2012 estimate)			São Tomé	São Tomé and Príncipe
155	Voorne-Putten	170,411 (2002)			Nissewaard	Kingdom of the Netherlands (Netherlands)
156	Carmen, Campeche	169,466 (2010 census)			Ciudad del Carmen	Mexico (Campeche)
157	Majuli	167,304 (2011 census)			Ratanpur Miri Gaon	India (Assam)
158	Saint Lucia	166,526 (2010 census)			Castries	Saint Lucia
159	Csepel Island	165,000 (2017 estimate)			21st District of Budapest	Hungary
160	Maui	164,754 (2020)			Kahului	United States (Hawaii)
161	Guimaras	162,943 (2010)			Buenavista	Philippines (Guimaras)
162	Buru	162,116 (2010 census)			Namlea	Indonesia (Maluku)
163	Shamian	161,390 (2010 census)			Shamian Subdistrict	China (Guangdong)
164	Guadalcanal	158,222 (2009 census includes Honiara and Guadalcanal Prov.)			Honiara	Solomon Islands
165	Tablas	158,050 (2010)			Odiongan	Philippines (Romblon)
166	Curaçao	156,971 (2015 census)			Willemstad	Kingdom of the Netherlands (Curaçao)
167	Lanzarote	156,189 (2021 estimate)			Arrecife	Spain (Canary Islands)
168	Biliran	155,061 (2010)			Naval	Philippines (Biliran)
169	Prince Edward Island	154,331 (2021 census)			Charlottetown	Canada (Prince Edward Island)
170	Guam	153,836 (2020)			Dededo	United States (Guam)
171	Malé	153,379 (2014 estimate)			Malé	Maldives
172	Ibiza	152,820 (2021 estimate)			Ibiza	Spain (Balearic Islands)
173	Qeshm	148,993 (2016 census)			Qeshm	Iran (Hormozgan)
174	Upolu	147,629 (2011 census)			Apia	Samoa
175	Mombasa	146,334			Mombasa (part of)	Kenya (Mombasa)
176	Alor	145,299 (2010 census)			Kalabahi	Indonesia (East Nusa Tenggara)
177	Yeong Island	144,884 (2010 census)			Yeongdo District	South Korea (Busan)
178	Isle of Wight	139,800 (2016 estimate)			Ryde	United Kingdom (England)
179	Djerba	139,517 (2004 census)			Houmt Souk	Tunisia (Medenine)
180	Malaita	137,596 (2009 census)			Auki	Solomon Islands (Malaita)
181	Bantayan	136,960 (2010 census)			Bantayan	Philippines (Cebu)
182	São Miguel	135,745 (2022 INE estimate)			Ponta Delgada	Portugal (Azores)
183	Cape Breton Island	132,019 (2021 census)			Cape Breton Regional Municipality	Canada (Nova Scotia)
184	Xiaoguwei	131,470 (2010 census)			Xiaoguwei Subdistrict	China (Guangdong)
185	Hisingen	130,497 (2007)			Gothenburg (part of)	Sweden (Västra Götaland)
186	Vanua Levu	130,000			Labasa	Fiji (Northern)
187	Kinmen	128,124 (2021 census)			Jincheng	Taiwan (Kinmen)
188	Awaji	126,980 (2020 census)			Minamiawaji	Japan (Hyōgo)
189	Kutubdia Upazila	125,279 (2011 census)			Kutubdia Upazila	Bangladesh (Chittagong)
190	Bilu	122,126 (2014 census)			Chaungzon	Myanmar (Mon State)
191	Srirangam	120,000 (2011 census)			Srirangam	India (Tamil Nadu)
192	Rote	119,908 (2010 census)			Ba'a	Indonesia (East Nusa Tenggara)
193	Rhodes	119,830 (2011 census)			Rhodes	Greece (South Aegean)
194	Fuerteventura	119,662 (2021 estimate)			Puerto del Rosario	Spain (Canary Islands)
195	Dordrecht	118,601 (2009)			Dordrecht	Kingdom of the Netherlands (Netherlands)
196	Lembata	117,829 (2010 census)			Lewoleba	Indonesia (East Nusa Tenggara)
197	Biak	112,873 (2010 census)			Kota Biak	Indonesia (Papua)
198	Nansha	112,151 (2010 census)			Nansha Subdistrict	China (Guangdong)
199	Peleng	109,319 (2010 census)			Basiano	Indonesia (Central Sulawesi)
200	Bengkalis	108,700 (2010 census)			Bengkalis	Indonesia (Riau)
201	Saint Vincent	108,600 (2000)			Kingstown	Saint Vincent and the Grenadines
202	Songzhou	106,274 (2010 census)			Songzhou Subdistrict	China (Guangdong)
203	Daishan	105,945 (2014 census)			Gaoting	China (Zhejiang)
204	Lantau Island	105,000			Tung Chung New Town	China (Hong Kong)
205	Corfu	104,371 (2011 census)			Corfu	Greece (Ionian Islands)
206	Jersey	104,200 (2016 estimate)			St Helier	United Kingdom (Jersey)
207	Södermalm	104,017 (2021)			Stockholm (parts of)	Sweden (Stockholm County)
208	Aruba	103,484 (2006 estimate)			Oranjestad	Kingdom of the Netherlands (Aruba)
209	Phú Quốc	103,000 (2012 census)			Dương Đông	Vietnam (An Giang)
210	Taipa	102,759 (2016 by-census)			Freguesia de Nossa Senhora do Carmo	China (Macau)
211	Menorca	102,477 (1 January 2025)			Ciutadella de Menorca	Spain (Balearic Islands)
212	Abadan Island	100,000 + but exact population is unknown			Abadan (part of)	Iran
213	Yeongjongdo	100,000 (2022)			Yeongjong International City	South Korea (Incheon)

== Peninsulas and other areas not regarded as islands ==
Region	Population	Density (km^{2})	Density (sq mi)	Country	Notes
Peloponnese	1,100,071 (2011)	51.05	132.2	Greece	Peninsula (connected to mainland by a narrow isthmus which is crossed by a canal with no lock)
Delmarva	681,030 (2000)	48.21	124.9	United States	Peninsula (connected to mainland by a narrow isthmus which is crossed by a canal with no lock)
Gimpo	657,000 (2021)	2,096	5,430	South Korea	Peninsula (connected to mainland by a narrow isthmus which is crossed by a canal)
Flevopolder	362,336 (2021)	373.54	967.5	Kingdom of the Netherlands (Netherlands)	Artificial island
Cape Cod	210,000 (2010)	238	620	United States (Massachusetts)	Peninsula (connected to mainland by isthmus which is crossed by a canal with no lock)
Songdo	188,213 (2021)	3,000	7,800	South Korea (Incheon)	Artificial island
Taipa–Coloane	129,648 (2016)	6,030	15,600	China (Macau)	Islands joined by a causeway and subsequently land reclamation
Samosir	108,869 (2020)	2,507.44	6,494.2	Indonesia (North Sumatra)	Peninsula within Lake Toba (connected to the island of Sumatra by a narrow isthmus which is crossed by a canal with no lock)
Potonggang-guyok	105,180 (2008)	14,000	36,000	North Korea (Pyongyang)	Artificial island between Pothong River and Pothonggang Canal

== See also ==
- List of islands by area
- List of islands by population density
- List of islands of Australia by population
- List of Canadian islands by population
- List of Caribbean countries by population
- List of European islands by population
- List of Indonesian islands by population
- List of islands of South America
- List of Oceanian countries by population
- List of populated islands of the Great Lakes
