= Holy Trinity Church, Saibai Island =

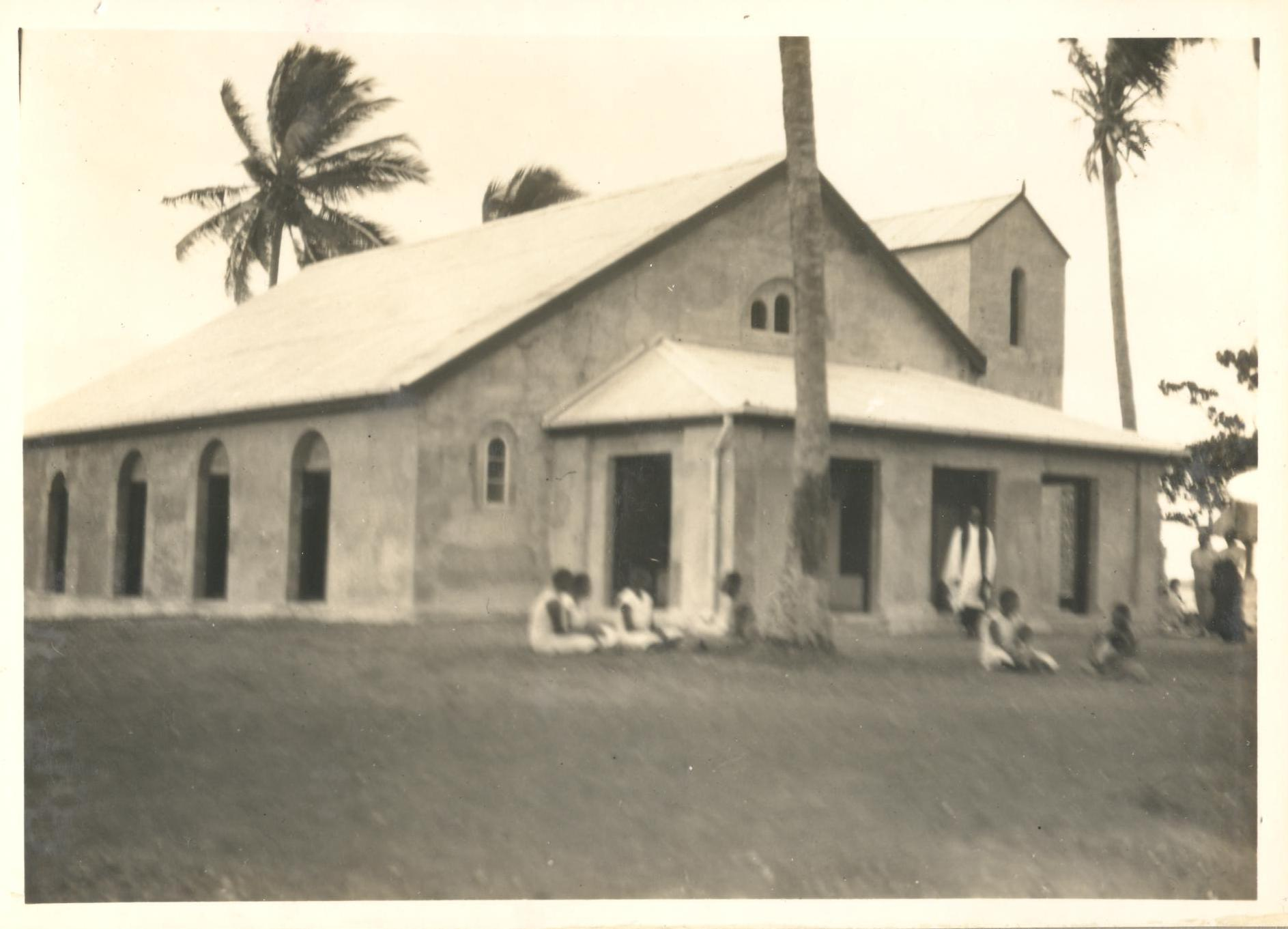
- Holy Trinity Church, still under construction, 1934

- Location within Queensland Location within Australia
- 9.3802°S 142.6194°E
- Location: Saibai Island, Torres Strait Island Region, Queensland, Australia

History
- Built: 1926 - 1938

Site notes
- Architectural style: Classicism

Queensland Heritage Register
- Official name: Holy Trinity Church, Holy Trinity Church of England
- Type: state heritage (landscape, built)
- Designated: 21 October 1992
- Reference no.: 600874
- Significant period: 1870s-1920s (historical); 1917-1930s (fabric)
- Significant components: views to, tower - bell / belfry, furniture/fittings, church

Holy Trinity Church is a heritage-listed Anglican church at Saibai Island, Torres Strait Island Region, Queensland, Australia. It was built from 1917 to 1938. It is also known as Holy Trinity Church of England. It was added to the Queensland Heritage Register on 21 October 1992.

== History ==
The first missionaries, representing the Society for the Propagation of the Gospel in Foreign Parts, arrived at the newly established settlement of Somerset, Cape York Peninsula, in March 1867, followed by the London Missionary Society (LMS) in July 1871. The London Missionary Society arrived at Saibai Island in July 1871. The first substantial building for Christian worship was constructed in 1881. This was replaced by the Holy Trinity Church, on which construction began about 1917 and was completed about 1938.

The first Christian missionary in the Torres Straits, Rev F.C. Jagg, was appointed on behalf of the Society for the Propagation of Gospel in Foreign Parts, and arrived in Somerset with his family on 15 March 1867. A young English schoolteacher, W.T. Kennett, funded by the Queensland Government to establish a school at Somerset, arrived with Rev Jagg and started a mission school on 1 October 1867. A lack of funding, lack of support from the government administration and dismay at the brutality of the police meant that the mission was closed by June 1868.

In 1871 the London Missionary Society arrived in the Torres Strait on the vessel Surprise, a ship owned or chartered by the LMS, after the French Government had demanded their removal from the Loyalty Islands and New Caledonia in 1869. The LMS decided to expand into the Torres Strait and New Guinea. They were represented by two Englishmen, Revs S. Macfarlane and A.W. Murray, 8 Lifu (Loyalty Islander) evangelists and their wives. The missionaries arrived at Darnley Island (Erub) on 1 July 1871, an event which came to be known as the "Coming of the Light" and which is now celebrated by Torres Strait Islanders annually as the Coming of the Light Festival.

Two Islander missionaries were left on Darnley Island while the remaining missionaries travelled to Warrior Island (Tudu Island), where they were welcomed by Captain Banner, who had an established pearl shell fishery on the island. John Joseph, an employee of Banner's, travelled with the missionaries as an interpreter to Dauan Island on 6 July, and finding most of the islanders were away on Saibai Island, they were taken to Saibai by Nudai, the chief of Dauan. Two islander missionaries, Josaia and Sivene, were left at Saibai and Dauan. Further missionaries were left on Yorke and Yam Islands, while HMS Surprise sailed to the newly established settlement at Somerset.

The London Missionary Society established temporary headquarters at Somerset from where they could expand their operations into other Torres Strait Islands and the mainland of New Guinea . Between 1871 and 1878 at least 131 Pacific Islander teachers, mainly from Loyalty Islands, Cook Islands, Niue, Society Islands and Rurutu, taught in the Torres Strait and New Guinea, along with their wives and families. Only four European missionaries taught in the same period .

In 1872 the London Missionary Society revisited selected islands in the Torres Straits. They reported that the missionaries that had been left on Dauan and Saibai had been accepted into the local tribes and had been given land by the local chiefs.

The Queensland Government annexed the islands of the Torres Straits within 60 miles (97 km) of the mainland in 1872, followed by the remainder of the islands in 1879. This was in response to fear of rival colonial powers controlling what had become an important shipping route, also as a means of controlling the increasingly lucrative beche-de-mer and pearl shelling economies and in particular regulating the use of Torres Strait and South Sea Islander labour in these industries. The government moved its administration centre from Somerset to Thursday Island in 1877; however, the lack of government resources, such as a regular patrol boat, meant that administration of the islands had to be left to the London Missionary Society .

A theological facility called the Papuan Institute was established on Mer, an island of the Torres Straits, to train Torres Strait Islanders as priests and suitable students were selected by the London Missionary Society. The Institute was closed in 1888, but had trained a number of local priests who were familiar with both formal missionary teaching and the local Islander customs.

By 1890 the Torres Strait Mission was beginning to slow its operations in the Torres Straits. Conversion on the islands had been successful and Papua was seen to be "waiting for the Light". A full time superintendent on the islands was no longer deemed necessary and the incumbent priest, Rev James Chalmers, moved to Saguane in the Fly River in New Guinea. Teacher/supervisors were appointed on various islands by the Queensland Government, and in 1904 the Protector of Aborigines assumed comprehensive control of Islanders lives under the Queensland Aboriginal Protection Act 1897.

Worship on various islands was then led by the Islander priests who had been trained at the Papuan Institute with annual inspections from London Missionary Society representatives travelling from New Guinea.

In 1914 the secretary of the London Missionary Society requested that the Bishop of Carpentaria, Gilbert White, take over the missionary work in the Torres Strait due to financial pressure. This was formally accepted by the Australian Board of Missions in November 1914 and the Anglican Church assumed responsibility for the Torres Strait Mission. All the leases granted to the London Missionary Society, including the buildings, were transferred to the Anglican Church. Coming of the Light celebrations were instituted by the Anglican Church soon after they took over, as a tribute to the London Missionary Society and perhaps as a way of ensuring continuity of worship. This celebration continues to be celebrated annually by Torres Strait Islanders both in the Torres Straits and in Torres Strait Islander communities on the Australian mainland.

The first building used for worship on Saibai is described in the "50th Anniversary of Holy Trinity Church Saibai Island" as an "island style building". It was replaced with a more substantial building called "Panetha" built by Nemia, a Samoan missionary who arrived on Saibai in 1881.

Chief Council Gauga Awabu decided that "Panetha" needed to be replaced and a third church building called "Mari Yoewth", built from corrugated iron salvaged from "Panetha", was used temporarily while the Holy Trinity Church was being constructed4. Three generations of Saibai Islanders worked on the construction of the Holy Trinity Church over 19 years. Saibai men worked on boats in the fishing industry to raise funds for timber, cement and the corrugated iron roofing needed for the building.

Construction materials consisted of Portland cement for the foundations and concrete slab floor, lime gravel and sand poured into a mangrove timber framework for the 30-centimetre (12 in) thick cement walls and wongai timber rafters. Canoes brought coral for lime from the Saibailgua Maza (Saibai Reef), Dauanalgau Maza (Dauan Reef), Gawal Maza and Wai Reef. It was burned on the beach to form lime and mixed with sand and gravel in canoes using wooden paddles. Dauan Islanders assisted with burning the coral and transporting it to Saibai and Boigu Islanders provided food for the workers during the monsoon. The wongai timber was brought from the New Guinea mainland, some was also recycled from "Panetha".

Foreman carpenters were Saibai Islanders, specifically Kanai, Baudu, Isua, Elu, Zsunai, Aniba, Bamaga and Waiangu. A European mission carpenter with the surname Irish, supervised the construction of the roof and Rev John Done, based on Mabuiag Island, provided plans and visited the construction site from time to time.

On 24 July 1926 the Archbishop of Brisbane Gerald Sharp blessed the granite foundation stone of Holy Trinity Church. The Church was dedicated by Rev Stephen Davies, the Bishop of Carpentaria, on 4 December 1938. Islanders from throughout the Torres Straits and New Guinea mainlanders attended the dedication travelling to Saibai in pearl, beche-de-mer and trochus luggers and in outrigger canoes. Over 1500 people attended the dedication.

The Holy Trinity bell, donated by Thomas Soki, was installed in the bell tower around the time of World War II. Previous to the installation of the bell a bu-shell, a native shell to the Torres Straits reefs, had been used to call people to church.

Holy Trinity Church incorporates hand carved furnishings of Wongai plum originally used in the early church, "Panetha". Along with these are new carvings also from Wongai were produced for Holy Trinity. Involved in the carving of the early furniture were islanders Aki, Kebisu Baira and Daku Garmai. This furniture comprised a cross, two candlesticks and a lectern.

== Description ==
Holy Trinity Church is situated on the waterfront of Saibai Island. It looks across to New Guinea which is less than 7 kilometres (4.3 mi) away. The building is about 12 metres (39 ft) from the water's edge and is protected from waves by a sea wall.

The building is constructed of unreinforced mass concrete footings, floor and walls, constructed from crushed coral, sand and cement. The building has a timber framed gable roof clad with fibrous cement sheeting. Timber roof trusses are exposed internally and there is no internal ceiling lining.

The form of the Holy Trinity Church is simple, with 3 bays extending from the rectangular central nave area. The 3 bays consist of a front entry area facing the road, alcove at the rear of the building towards the coast and bell tower to one side of the building. Double arch doors are present on each side of the building and double rectangular doors lead to the front entry area facing the road. The bell tower is no longer used, the higher section being constructed from mass concrete blocks with little or no mortar connecting them. The bell tower has an independent steeply pitched roof constructed with the same materials as the main roof.

The grounds are grassed with a small number of trees and shrubs. An independent timber framed bell tower is present on one side of the building, behind which is a freestanding crucifix depicting an image of Jesus. A white rainwater tank is at the rear of the building.

== Heritage listing ==
Holy Trinity Church was listed on the Queensland Heritage Register on 21 October 1992 having satisfied the following criteria.

The place is important in demonstrating the evolution or pattern of Queensland's history.

Holy Trinity Church, Saibai Island survives as important evidence of the development of missionary activity in the Torres Straits that started in 1871.

The place is important in demonstrating the principal characteristics of a particular class of cultural places.

The building is an important example of a Torres Strait Christian church and was constructed over a period of 19 years by Saibai Islanders and London Missionary Society missionaries using local materials such as burnt coral, mangrove timber and Wongai plum timber and incorporating materials and hand carved furnishings of the previous church, "Panetha", constructed by a Samoan London Society Missionary in 1881. It is influenced by Torres Strait vernacular architecture with elements such as locally sources construction material, mass unreinforced cement footings and decorative internal arches.

The place has a strong or special association with a particular community or cultural group for social, cultural or spiritual reasons.

The place has a strong and special religious significance with Torres Strait Christians and with the London Missionary Society and Anglican Church and has served as a focus of Christian worship since the construction of the first church at this site prior to 1881.
