= Saibai =

Saibai may refer to:

- Saibai Island, in Australia's Torres Straits
  - Saibai, Queensland, a town on the island
  - Saibai Island Airport
- Maharani Saibai, a Maratha queen
- Saibai Yuuki, a To Love-Ru character
