= List of islands of Australia by population =

This is a list of Australian islands ordered by population.

For the purposes of this article, the Australian mainland is considered a continent.

Ranking	Island	Population	Density		Largest settlement	State or territory	Additional references
Ranking	Island	Population	per km^{2}	per sq mi	Largest settlement	State or territory	Additional references
–	Mainland Australia	24,790,980 (2021) (Note: This is the national population, with all island populations listed in this table subtracted. As such there may be minor inaccuracies related to smaller islands which are not included.)	3.2	8.3	Sydney	Multiple	
1	Mainland Tasmania	554,012 (2021) (Note: This is the state population, with the populations of Flinders, King, Bruny and Cape Barren Islands subtracted)	8.59	22.2	Hobart	Tasmania	
2	Bribie Island	20,612 (2021)	139	360	Bongaree	Queensland	
3	Phillip Island	13,799 (2021)	137	355	Cowes	Victoria	
4	Kangaroo Island	4894 (2021)	1.11	2.87	Kingscote	South Australia	
5	Russell Island	3698 (2021)	122	316	-	Queensland	
6	Macleay Island	3193 (2021)	207	536	-	Queensland	
7	Thursday Island	2805 (2021)	801	2,070	-	Queensland	
8	Elcho Island	2628 (2021)	9.32	24.1	Galiwinku	Northern Territory	
9	Magnetic Island	2475 (2021)	47.6	123	Horseshoe Bay	Queensland	
10	Groote Eylandt	2427 (2021)	1.04	2.69	Alyangula	Northern Territory	
11	Norfolk Island	2188 (2021)	63.2	164	Burnt Pine	Norfolk Island	
12	North Stradbroke Island	2156 (2021)	7.83	20.3	Dunwich	Queensland	
13	Great Palm Island	2098 (2021)	38.1	98.7	-	Queensland	
14	Hindmarsh Island	1846 (2021)	40.6	105	-	South Australia	
15	Hamilton Island	1759 (2021)	234	606	-	Queensland	
16	Christmas Island	1692 (2021)	12.5	32.4	Flying Fish Cove	Christmas Island	
17	King Island	1617 (2021)	1.47	3.81	Currie	Tasmania	
18	Bathurst Island	1484 (2021)	0.571	1.48	Wurrumiyanga	Northern Territory	
19	Milingimbi Island	1097 (2021)	22.4	58.0	Milingimbi	Northern Territory	
20	Mornington Island	1022 (2021)	1.00	2.59	Gununa	Queensland	
21	Bruny Island	1008 (2021)	2.78	7.20	Alonnah	Tasmania	
22	Melville Island	867 (2021)	0.150	0.388	Milikapiti	Northern Territory	
23	Flinders Island	850 (2021)	0.622	1.61	Whitemark	Tasmania	
24	Badu Island	704 (2021)	6.97	18.1	Wakaid	Queensland	
25	Lord Howe Island	445 (2021)	30.6	79.3	-	New South Wales	
26	Home Island	448			Bantam	Cocos (Keeling) Islands	
27	Moa Island	432 (2021)	2.54	6.58	St Pauls	Queensland	
28	Saibai Island	340 (2021)	4.35	11.3	Saibai	Queensland	
29	Rottnest Island	166 (2021)				Western Australia	
30	West Island	120				Cocos (Keeling) Islands	

== See also ==
- List of islands of Australia
