= Birpur =

Birpur may refer to:

- Birpur, Ghazipur, a large village in Uttar Pradesh, India
- Birpur, Raebareli, a village in Uttar Pradesh, India
- Birpur, Supaul, a city in Bihar, India
- Birpur, Vaishali, a village in Bihar, India
- Birpur, Nepal, a town in Shivaraj Municipality, Kapilvastu District, Lumbini Province
- Birpur Subdivision,Supaul, a Subdivision in Supaul district.

== See also ==
- Birpur Barahi, a village development committee in Saptari District, Nepal
