= George Mye =

Australian Torres Strait Islander activist

Jacob George Mye MBE OAM AM (3 December 1926 – 26 April 2012) was an elder statesman from the Torres Strait.

A vocal advocate of land and sea rights for Torres Strait Islanders, Mye is credited with helping the region gain autonomy from Queensland, with the formation of the Torres Strait Regional Authority in 1994.

Mye served as a commissioner with the Aboriginal and Torres Strait Islander Commission and was involved in local government in the Torres Strait for more than 20 years.

In recognition of Mye's work with the Torres Strait Islander community, he received numerous honours throughout his career, including an MBE in the 1979 New Year Honours, an OAM in the 1994 Australia Day honours, a Male Elder of the Year Award at the 1998 NAIDOC Awards, and a Centenary of Federation Medal in 2001.

He also worked as a cultural consultant on the SBS drama series RAN Remote Area Nurse, which was filmed in the Torres Strait.

Mye died from pneumonia on 26 April 2012. His death prompted tributes from political and community leaders including Queensland Premier Campbell Newman and Member for Leichhardt Warren Entsch. His funeral was held at All Saints Anglican Church on Darnley Island on 16 May 2012.

Following his death, Mye was posthumously awarded an AM in the 2013 Australia Day Honours.
