= Coming of the Light Festival =

Annual festival in the Torres Strait Islands

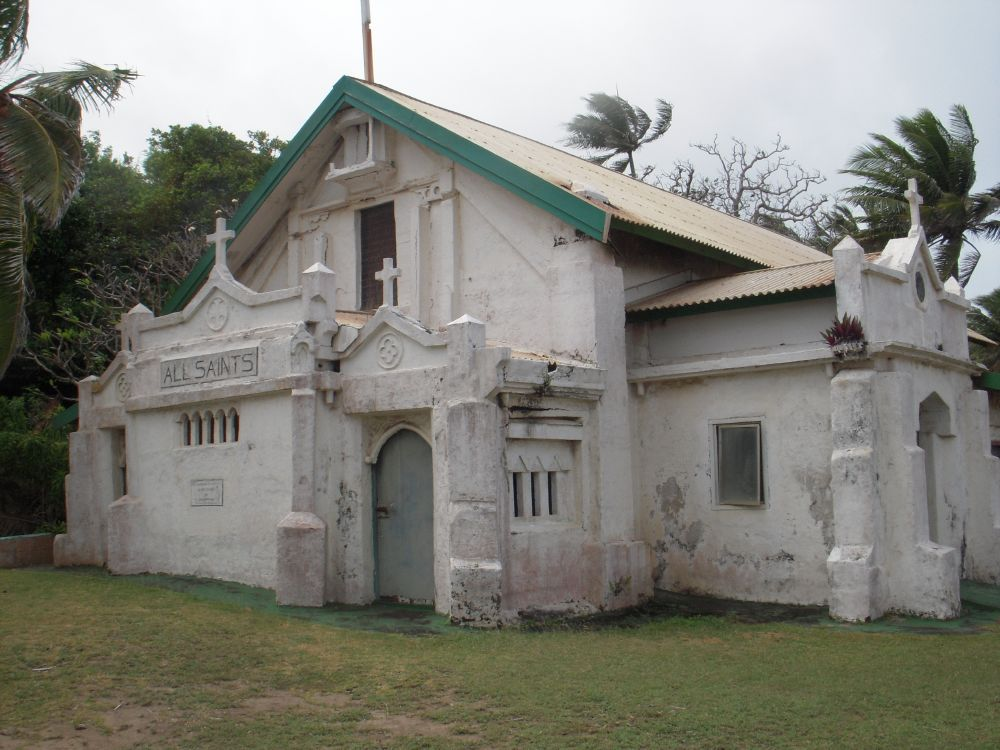
All Saints Anglican Church on Erub (Darnley Island) in the Torres Strait.

The Coming of the Light Festival is celebrated in the Torres Strait Islands on 1 July each year. It commemorates the arrival of the London Missionary Society in Torres Strait at Erub (Darnley Island) on 1 July 1871, introducing Christianity to the region. The predominantly Christian Torres Strait Islanders hold religious and cultural ceremonies across Torres Strait and mainland Australia to celebrate the day.

== Origins ==
In 1871 representatives of the London Missionary Society (LMS) arrived in the Torres Straits on the schooner Surprise, (Note: For further information about Surprise, see Torres_Strait_Islanders#Coming_of_the_Light.) which had been chartered by the LMS, after the French Government had demanded their removal from the Loyalty Islands and New Caledonia in 1869. They decided to expand into the Torres Straits and New Guinea. They were represented by two Englishmen, Revs S. Macfarlane and Archibald Wright Murray, and eight Lifu (Loyalty Islander) evangelists: Tapeso, Elia, Mataika, Guchong, Kerisidui, Wauaded, Sevine and Josaia, and their wives.

The missionaries reached Erub (Darnley Island) on 1 July 1871, an event that came to be known as the "Coming of the Light". Dabad, one of the tribal elders of the island, met them at Kemus Beach. Dabad befriended the missionaries and introduced them to Amani, another tribal elder, and the rest of the Erub Islanders. His role in the bringing of Christianity to the Torres Straits is memorialised by Dabad's Monument at Badog.

== Related ==
- Christianity in Australia
- Indigenous Australians
- All Saints Anglican Church, Darnley Island
