= Songzhou Subdistrict =

Subdistrict in Guangzhou, People's Republic of China

Songzhou Subdistrict 松洲街道
- Subdistrict
- Interactive map of Songzhou Subdistrict
- Coordinates: 23°09′34″N 113°13′04″E
- Country: People's Republic of China
- Province: Guangdong
- Sub-provincial city: Guangzhou
- District: Baiyun
- Time zone: UTC+8 (China Standard Time)

Songzhou Subdistrict (Chinese: 松洲街道; pinyin: Sōngzhōu Jiēdào; Jyutping: cung^{4} zau^{1} gaai^{1} dou^{6}) is a subdistrict of Baiyun District, Guangzhou, People's Republic of China. As of 2022, it has 14 residential communities (社区) under its administration.

== See also ==
- List of township-level divisions of Guangdong
