= Ratanpur Miri Gaon =

- village
- Location in Assam, India
- Country: India
- State: Assam
- District: Majuli

Population (2011)
  - Total: 5,085

Languages
  - Official: Assamese
- Time zone: UTC+5:30 (IST)

Ratanpur Miri Gaon is a village in the Majuli district, in the northeastern state of Assam, India.

== Demography ==
In the 2011 census, Missamora had 947 families with a population of 5,085, consisting of 2,575 males and 2,510 females. The population of children aged 0–6 was 621, making up 12.21% of the total population of the village. The average sex ratio was 975 out of 1000, which is higher than the state average of 958 out of 1000. The child sex ratio in the village was 899 out of 1000, which is higher than the average of 962 out of 1000 in the state of Assam.
