= Birpur, Vaishali =

Birpur
- Village
- Location in Bihar, India
- Coordinates: 25.523570°N 85.457191°E
- Country: India
- State: Bihar
- District: Vaishali

Government
  - Type: Gram Panchayat
  - Body: Mukhiya

Area
  - Total: 25 km^{2} (9.7 sq mi)
  - Rank: 2
- Elevation: 46 m (151 ft)

Population (2016)
  - Total: 20,000
  - Density: 800/km^{2} (2,100/sq mi)

Languages
  - Regional: Maithili, Thethi
- Time zone: UTC+5:30 (IST)
- PIN: 844508
- Telephone code: 06224
- Lok Sabha constituency: Hajipur
- Vidhan Sabha constituency: Raghopur

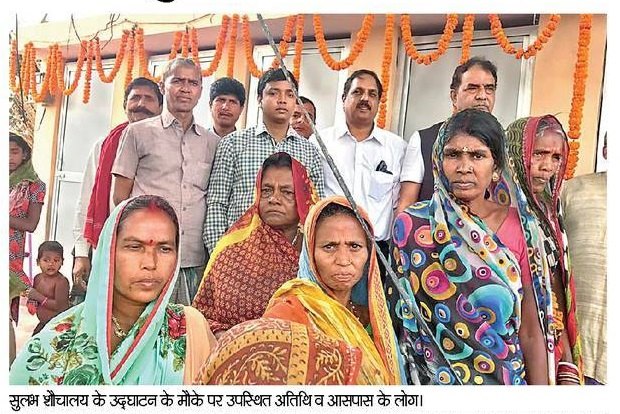
News Clipping of opening of 18 Deluxe toilets in Village

Birpur is a village in Vaishali district, Bihar which is situated at the river island called Raghopur Diyara Island.

. The residents are primarily dependent on agriculture, and traditionally, many of them join the Indian Army. The village has an approximate population of 20,000. A large number of villagers are employed outside the area in different sectors. Birpur falls under the Raghopur community block, and its police station is located in Jurawanpur. It is the second largest village in the Raghopur block in terms of both area and population. The village’s PIN code is 844508. The literacy rate is relatively low, and Bajjika is the most widely spoken language. It is spread over in the area of 20 km.

== Geography ==
Birpur is primarily divided into two major areas: Birpur Purvi (Birpur East) and Birpur Paschimi (Birpur West). These two areas comprise several smaller blocks or wards known as tolas. The village is surrounded by Rupas Mahaji to the east, Shiv Nagar to the west, Kala Diyara to the south, and the River Ganga to the north. The land near the river Ganga in the north is the main agricultural area.

Hajipur serves as the headquarters for this region, with the local Registrar's office located in Mahnar. Birpur is part of the Raghopur Community Development Block. The village is prone to flooding every 4–5 years due to its proximity to the River Ganga, causing significant challenges for the residents.

After 70 years of India's independence, Birpur was electrified in 2017.

=== Adjacent communities ===
- Khushropur
- Bakhtiyarpur
- Fatuha
- Mehnar
- Hajipur
- Patna

== Schools ==
- Birpur High School 10+2, Birpur uttri
- Shishu Gyan Shala Birpur
- Govt. middle school, Fenuabad, Birpur
- Govt. middle school, Sengar Tola, Birpur
- Harijan middle school, Birpur Purbi

== Temples ==
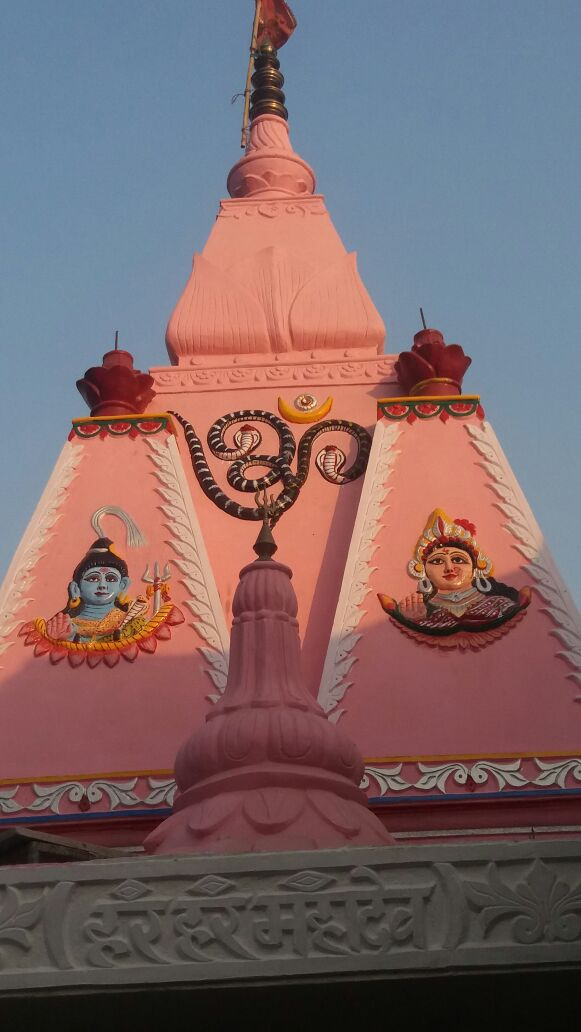

- Maa Badi Durga Mandir Uttari
- Maa Kali Mandir
- Brahma Baba Mandir"Barari east"

Maa Durga Mandir"Pethiya pr"

- Mahavireshwar Nath Mandir, Uparki, Birpur
- Maa Kaali mandir, Birpur east
- Maa Kaali Mandir, Birpur Badka Tola
- Mahavir Mandir, Birpur Badka Tola
- Janakeshwar nath mandir, Birpur east
- Shiv mandir, Uparki Tola, Birpur

== Transportation ==
Birpur is connected to Patna by pontoon bridge, Gyaspur andpontoon bridge, and kachchi dargah. When the floating bridge is not operational during the rainy season, people use boats or strimmers to cross the river because Pipa Pool is a seasonal floating bridge. Local vans operate between Gyaspur or Kachidragh.

=== Nearby railway stations ===
- Karauta
- Bakhtiyarpur
- Khushropur
- Fatuha
