= Harden Sidney Melville =

English painter and draughtsman

- Born: 8 May 1824; London
- Died: 4 June 1894 (age 70); London
- Known for: Paintings, illustrations and drawings. The first official hydrographic survey of the north-east coast of Australia in 1842–1846.
- Awards: Medal from the Society of Arts

Harden Sidney Melville (1824–1894) was an English painter, illustrator and draughtsman. He received a medal from the Society of Arts and had three paintings hung in the Royal Academy’s show between 1837 and 1841. He conducted the first official hydrographic survey of the north-east coast of Australia in 1842–1846 on board the H.M.S Fly, which was under the command of Captain Francis Price Blackwood. He illustrated Curiosities of Savage Life by James Greenwood and several notable Australian works including Joseph Beete Jukes’s official narrative of Fly’s voyage and Ludwig Leichhardt’s Journal.

He was the son of the engraver Henry William Melville (1792–1870) and Martha Harden.

He died on 4 June 1894 and was buried in Camden on 8 June 1894.

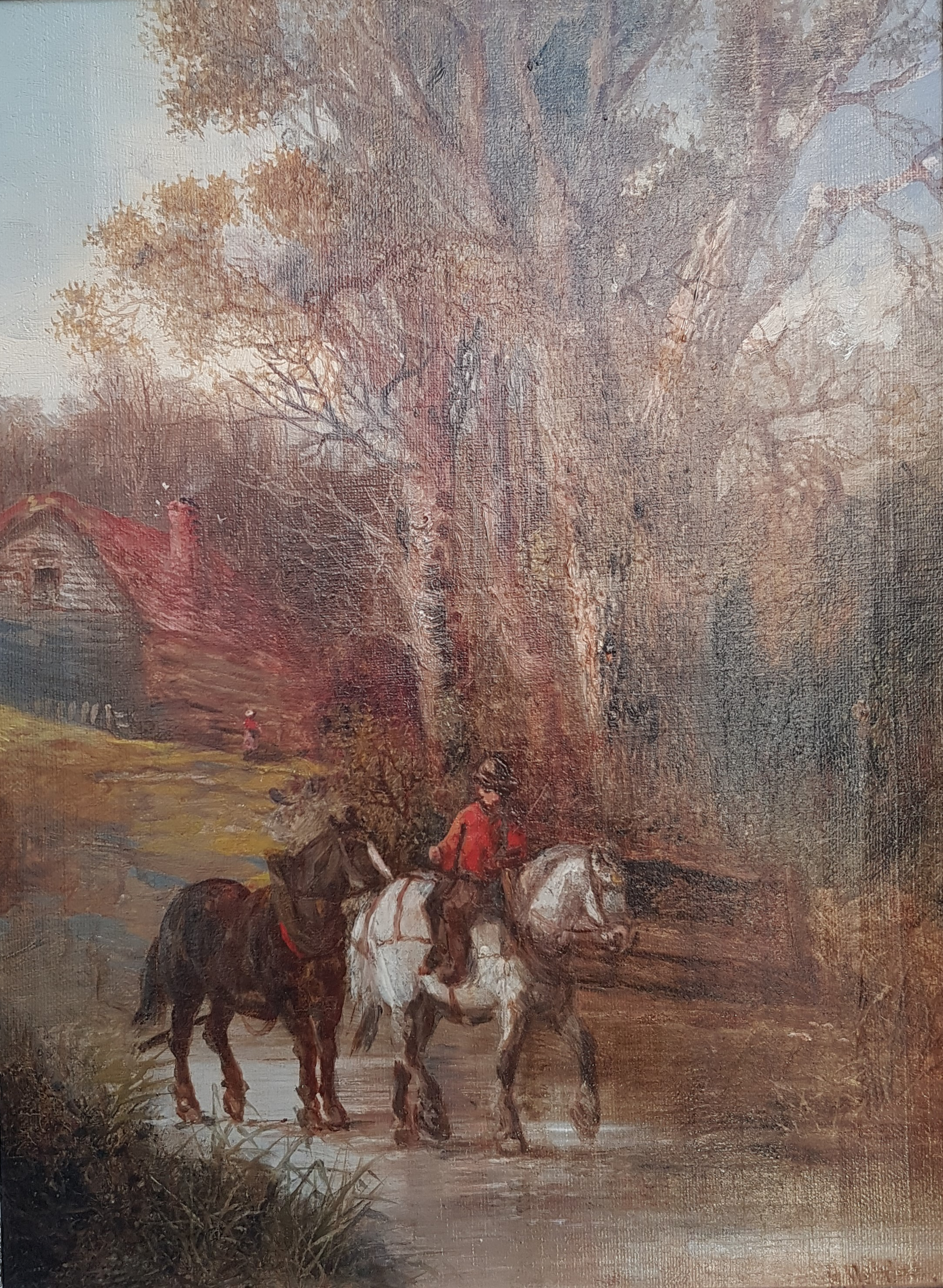
Harden Sidney Melville, Autumn Scene. Oil on canvas, c1880.

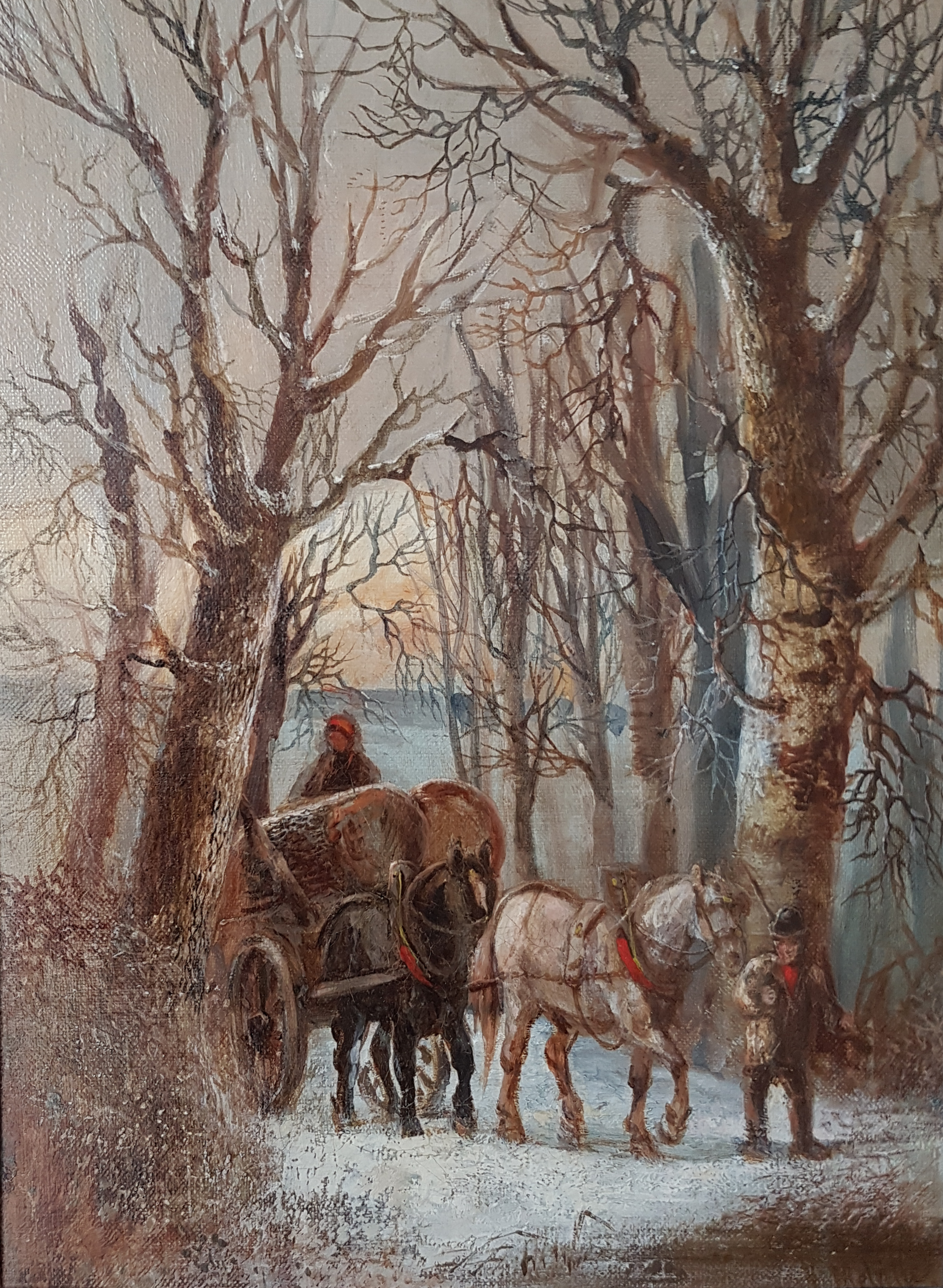
Harden Sidney Melville, Winter Scene. Oil on canvas, c1880.
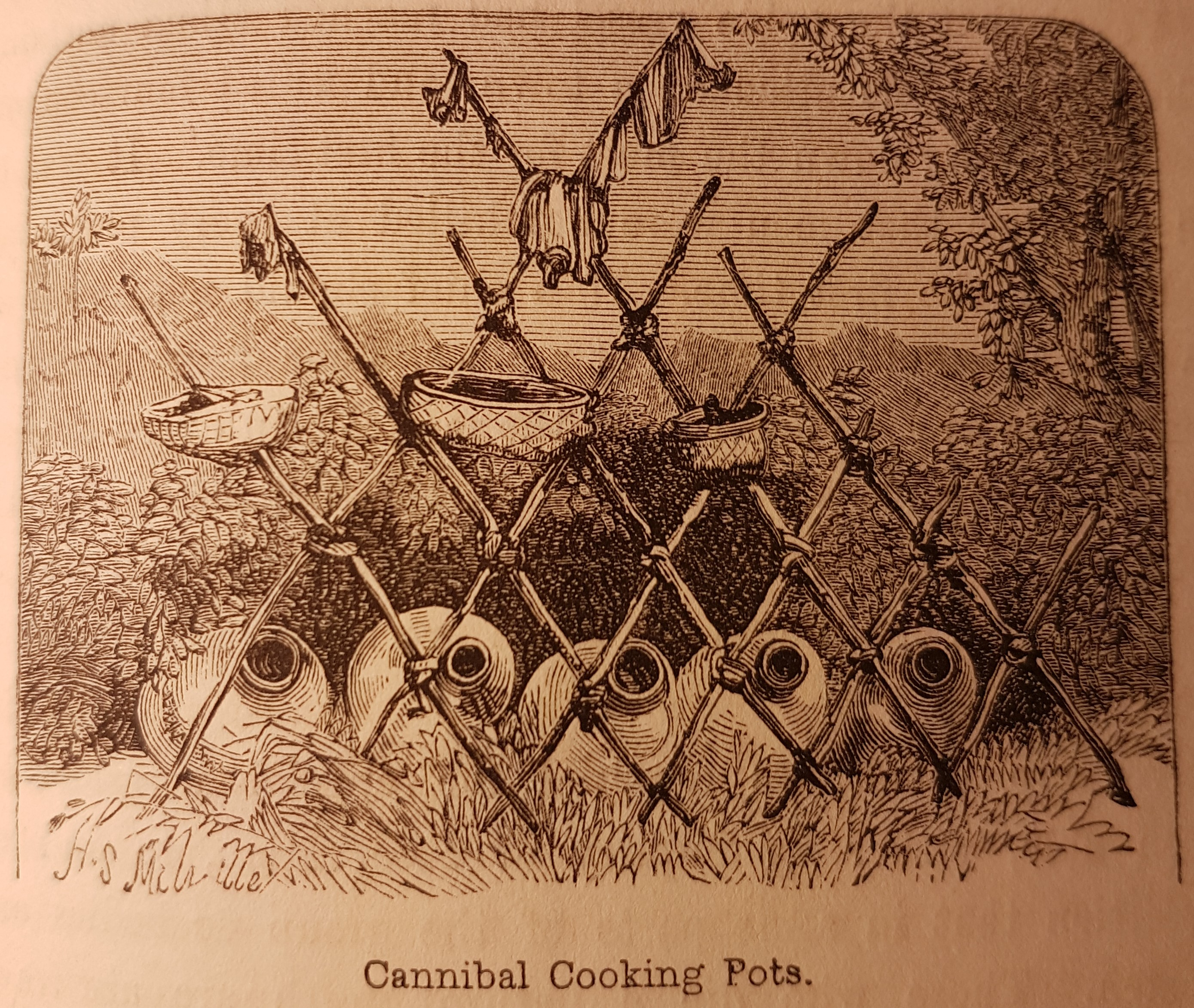
Cannibal Cooking Pots from Curiosities of Savage Life by James Greenwood, S.O. Beeton, 1863, page 281.

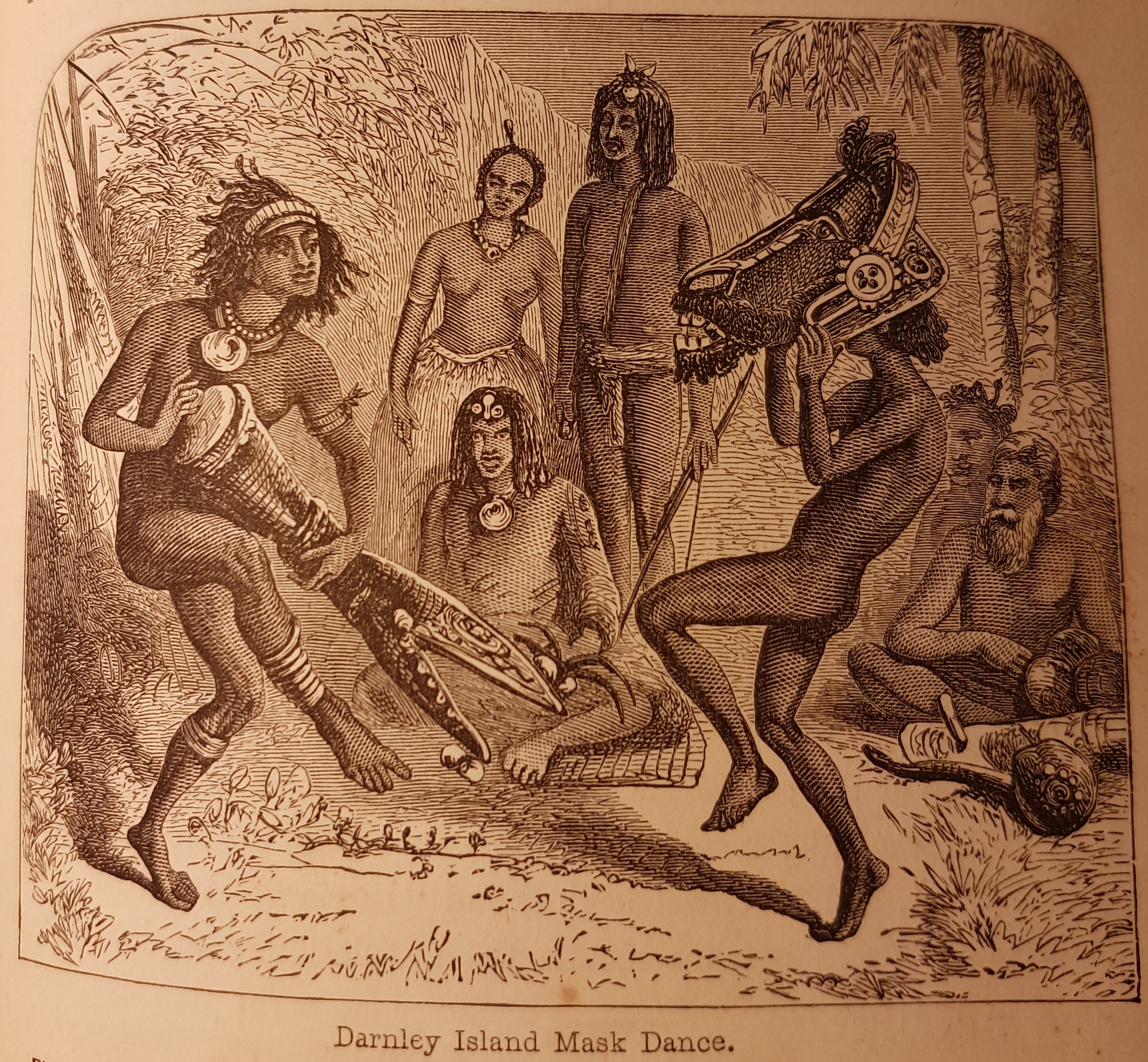
Darnley Island Mask Dance, from Curiosities of Savage Life by James Greenwood, S.O. Beeton, 1863, page 153.
