= Nansha Subdistrict =

Coordinates: 22.8025°N 113.5616°E

Nansha Subdistrict 南沙街道
- Subdistrict

Chinese transcription(s)
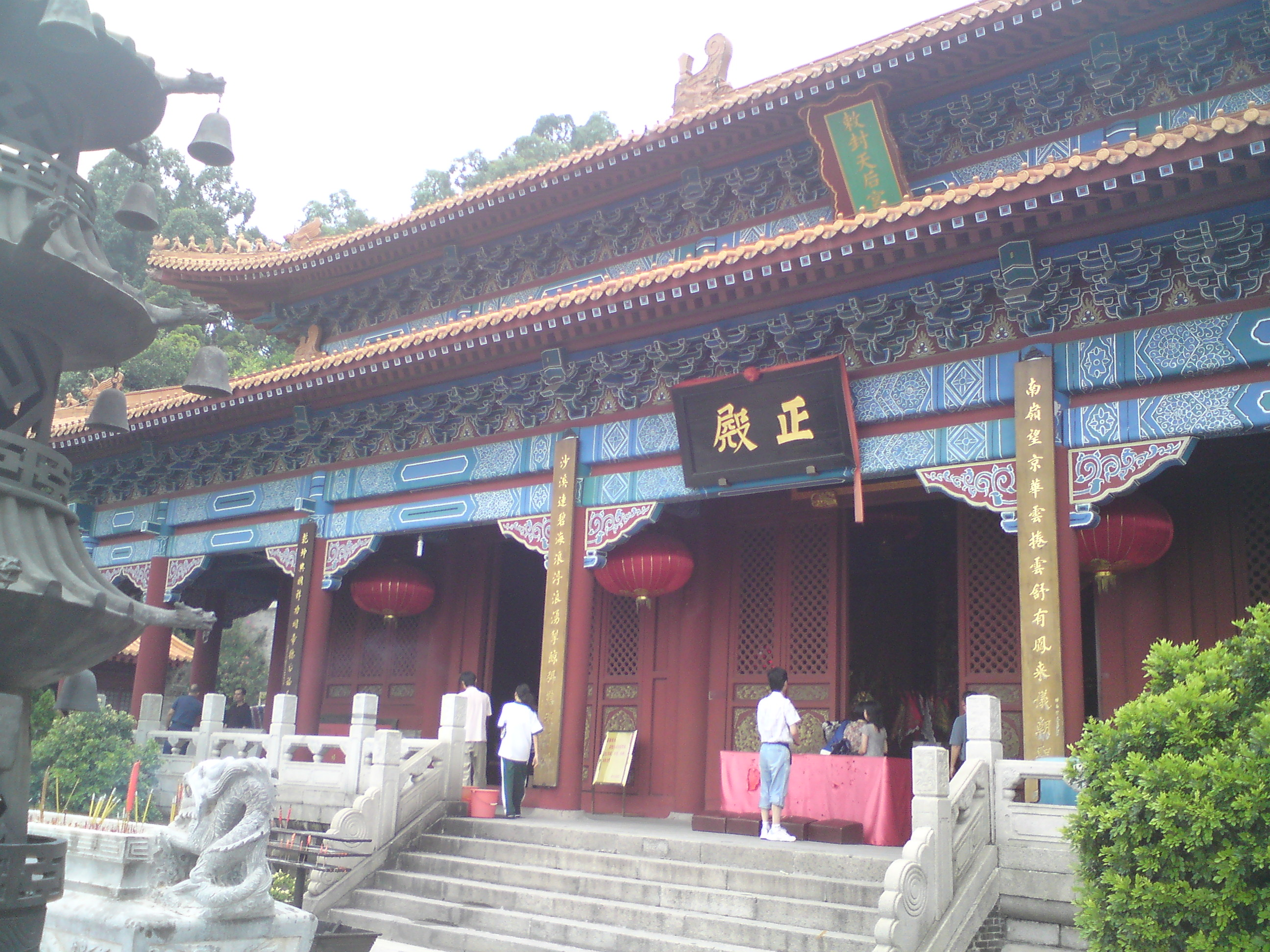
- Interactive map of Nansha Subdistrict
- Country: China
- Province: Guangdong
- Prefecture: Guangzhou
- District: Nansha
- Time zone: UTC+8 (China Standard Time)

Nansha Subdistrict, Guangzhou (Chinese: 南沙街道; pinyin: Nánshā Jiēdào) is a township-level division situated in Nansha District, Guangzhou, Guangdong, China.

== See also ==
- List of township-level divisions of Guangdong
