= Erub Island, Queensland =

Erub Island
- Suburb
- Interactive map of Erub Island
- Coordinates: 9.585°S 143.7699°E
- Country: Australia
- State: Queensland
- LGA: Torres Strait Island Region
- Location: 202 km (126 mi) NE of Thursday Island; 833 km (518 mi) NNW of Cairns; 2,200 km (1,400 mi) NNW of Brisbane

Government
  - State electorate: Cook
  - Federal division: Leichhardt

Area
  - Total: 5.7 km^{2} (2.2 sq mi)

Population
  - Total: 326 (2021 census)
  - Density: 57.2/km^{2} (148.1/sq mi)
- Time zone: UTC+10:00 (AEST)
- Postcode: 4875
Suburbs around Erub Island
Torres Strait	Torres Strait	Torres Strait
Torres Strait	Erub Island	Torres Strait
Torres Strait	Torres Strait	Torres Strait

Erub Island is an island locality in the Torres Strait Island Region, Queensland, Australia. It is one of the Torres Strait Islands and is located near the Great Barrier Reef and just south of the Bligh entrance. The locality contains only the island called Darnley Island (but is also known as Erub). The town on the island is also called Darnley Island. In the 2021 census, Erub Island had a population of 326 people.

Erub originates from the native Papuan language of Meriam Mir. It is within the local government area of Torres Strait Island Region. In the 2021 census, Erub Island had a population of 326 people, with 292 (89.6%) identifying as Indigenous Australians. The effective community language is Brokan (Torres Strait Creole), though many people also still speak Meriam Mir, the traditional language.

== Demographics ==
In the 2016 census, Erub Island had a population of 328 people.

In the 2021 census, Erub Island had a population of 326 people.

== Education ==
Darnley Island Campus is a primary (Early Childhood-6) campus (9.5952°S 143.7601°E) of Tagai State College. It is on Road No 6 on the south-western side of the island (9.5952°S 143.7602°E). There are no secondary schools on the island. The secondary campus of Tagai State College is on Thursday Island, over 200 kilometres (120 mi) away; it offers some boarding facilities, but many children are also sent to mainland secondary schools.

== Flora and fauna ==
The Kinabalu giant earthworm, Pheretima darnleiensis, is named after Darnley Island, although it is likely an introduced species there.

== Heritage listings ==
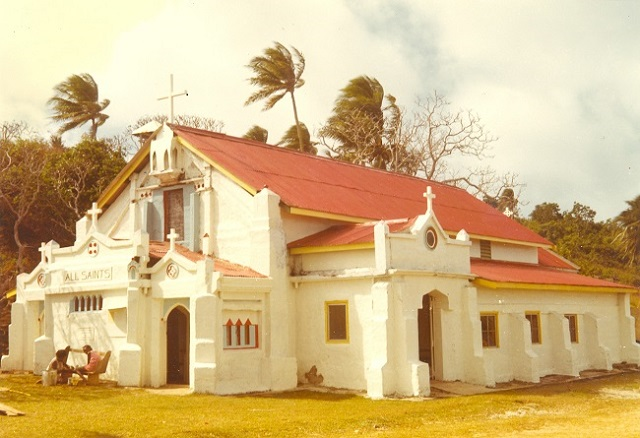
All Saints Anglican Church, 1971

Darnley Island has a heritage-listed site: All Saints Anglican Church.

== Amenities ==
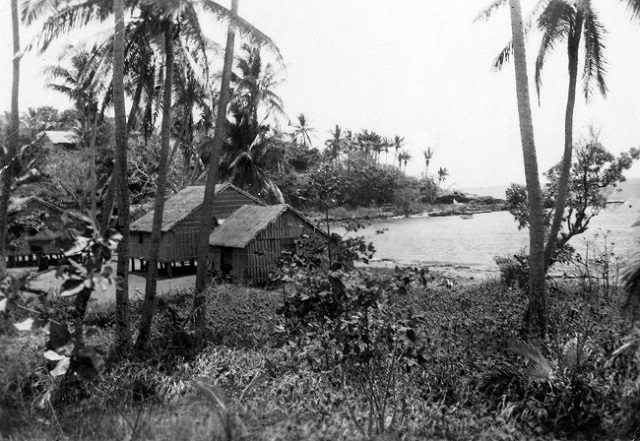
Houses on the beach, 1949

The Torres Strait Island Regional Council operate an Indigenous Knowledge Centre at Madige Village on Erub.

There are two stores, one school, and a health centre. Accommodation is available through Norah's Guest House, and the council run 'five star' dongas.

== History ==
The island was named by Captain William Bligh in 1792 during his second breadfruit voyage to the Pacific, after his distant relative, the Earl of Darnley.

In 1871 representatives of the London Missionary Society (LMS) arrived in the Torres Straits on the vessel Surprise, a ship owned or chartered by the LMS, after the French Government had demanded their removal from the Loyalty Islands and New Caledonia in 1869. They decided to expand into the Torres Straits and New Guinea. They were represented by two Englishmen, Reverend Samuel Macfarlane and Reverend A.W. Murray, and eight Lifu (Loyalty Islander) evangelists: Tapeso, Elia, Mataika, Guchong, Kerisidui, Wauaded, Sevine and Josaia, and their wives. The missionaries reached Erub on 1 July 1871, an event that came to be known as the "Coming of the Light". One of the tribal elders of the island, Dabad, met them at Kemus (or Kernus) Beach after which he introduced them to Amani, another tribal elder, and the rest of the Erub Islanders. His role in the bringing of Christianity to the Torres Straits is memorialised by Dabad's Monument at Badog. The inscription reads "In loving memory of Dabad 1871: A man who denied his tribal laws and accepted the good news of salvation". All Torres Strait Island communities celebrate the Coming of the Light Festival annually on 1 July.

Pearlers and beche-de-mer gatherers visited the island. Over many years, these industries attracted an influx of seamen from the Pacific Islands, the Philippines, and Malaya, many of whom married local women and settled on the island.

In the early 20th century, the Queensland Government started installing various facilities such as a school, medical aid, post office and an Island Industries Board store.

In 1919, the All Saints Church was constructed at the former site of the original London Missionary Society mission house and school. Locally produced lime from burnt coral and basalt was used and the work was done under the direction of Manai, an Erub Islander, and Ware, a South Sea Islander. It was originally known as the Ziona church. Darnley Island State School opened on 29 January 1985, replacing the earlier mission school. On 1 January 2007 it became the Darnley Island Campus of the Tagai State College (with its main campus on Thursday Island).

Darnley people have been at the forefront of the movement for adequate recognition of Torres Strait Islanders' rights. From the 1960s to the '90s, George Mye (Torres Strait Islander) was an elder and among the most prominent advocates of Islander interests. Carlemo Wacando was among the first to challenge the legal notion of terra nullius, which Australia had posited to support their annexation of traditional lands. The High Court of Australia ruled in Mabo v Queensland (No 2) (1992) in favor of traditional land ownership of the Torres Strait Islanders, which also applied to Australian aboriginal claims in their territories. The Native Title Act of 1993 was passed to administer these changes.

Pau Enterprises Indigenous Corporation was established in 2015 to manage and maintain the Pau family native title lands and interests on Darnley Island. It also seeks to create social enterprises on Darnley Island and other locations where its community members have migrated, such as Cairns.

Darnley Island became better known around Australia in 2015 when the acting school principal asked via social media for donations of books to assist her primary school children and their education. Her efforts resulted in more than 18,000 shares on Facebook, and hundreds of books were sent to the island.

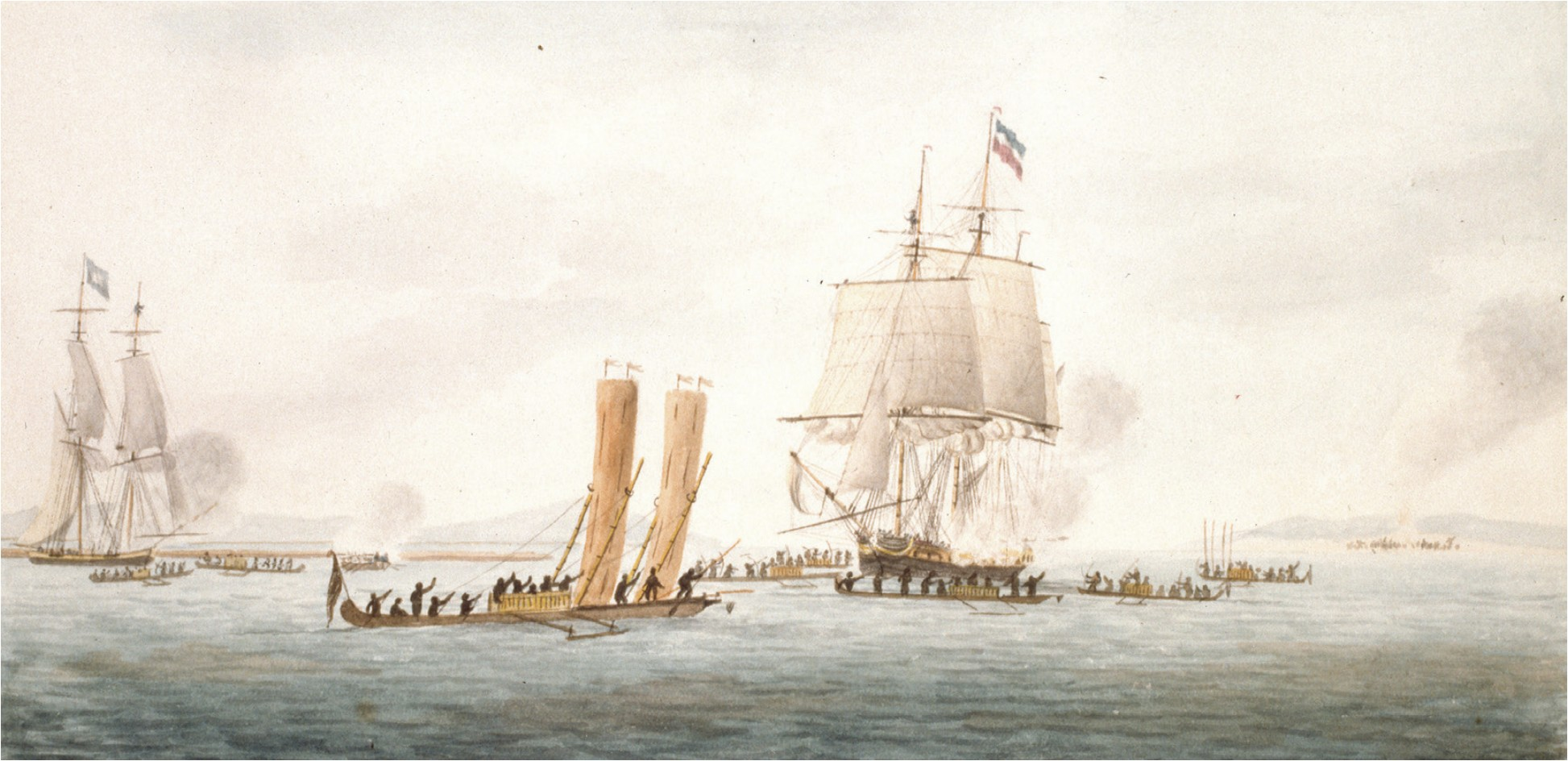
Canoes of Erub, eastern Torres Strait, painted by Lt. George Tobin, September 1792. The British ships are HMS Providence and HMS Assistant.

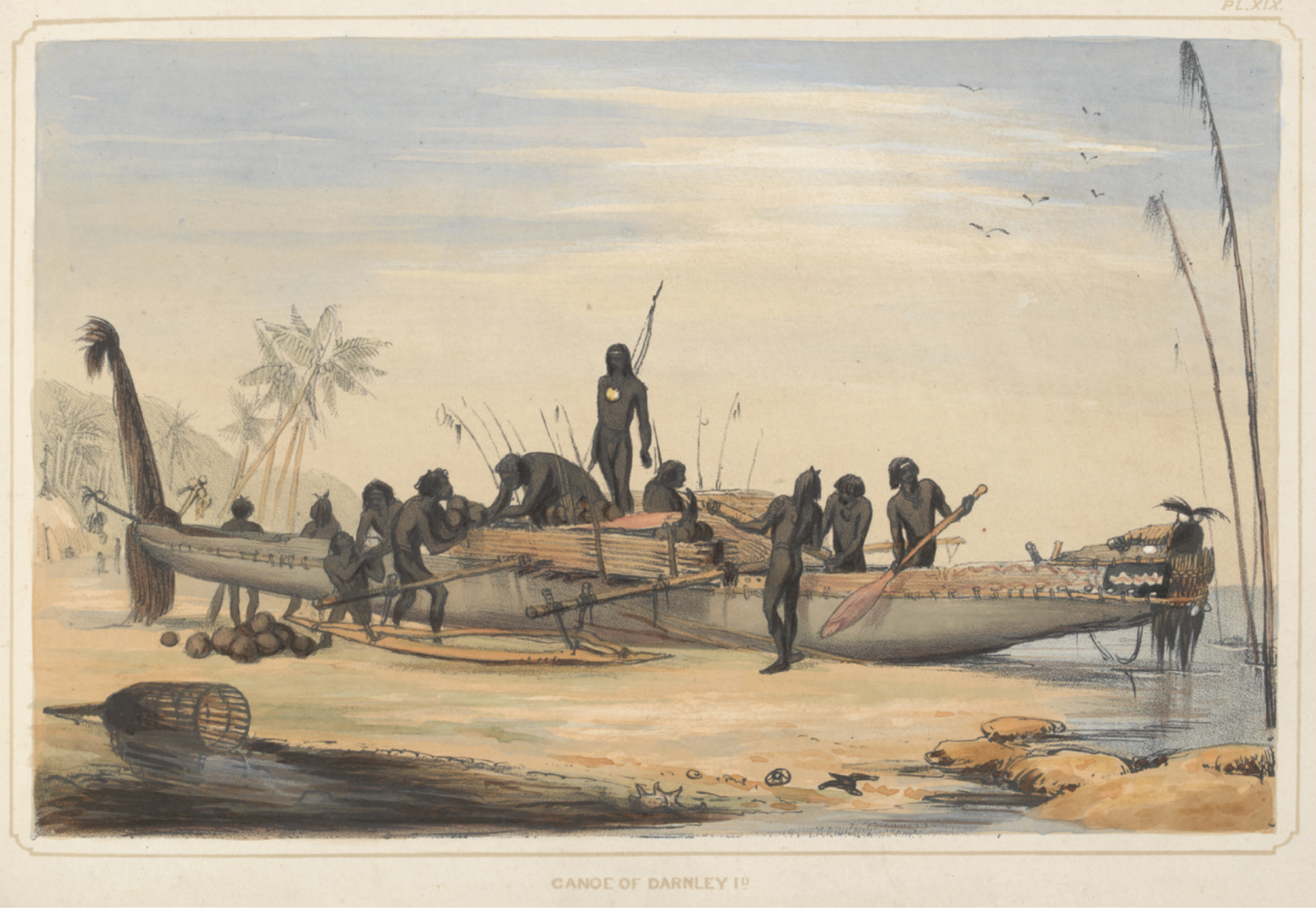
Hand-coloured lithograph of a canoe at Erub, drawn by Harden Sidney Melville, 1844-45

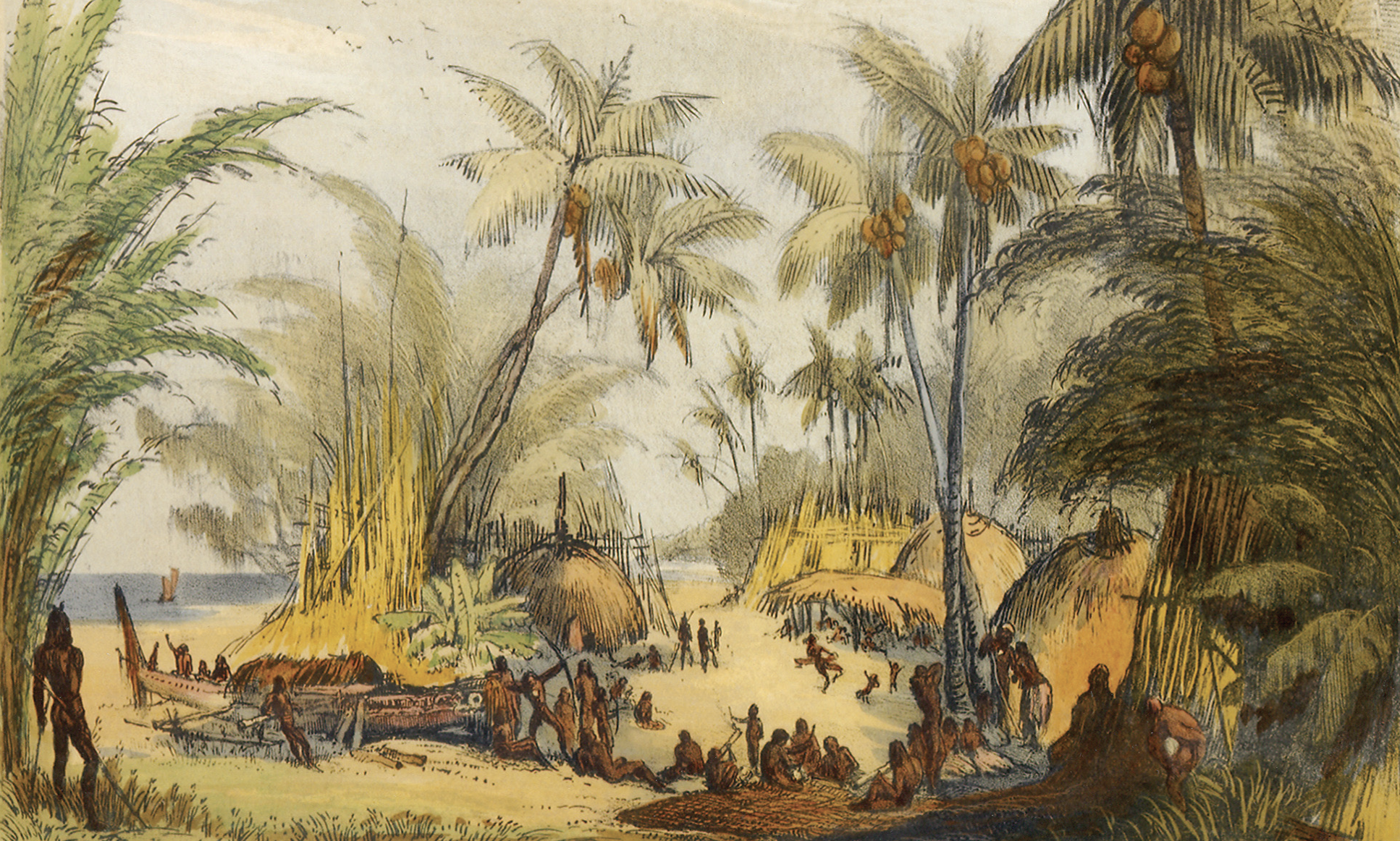
Hand-coloured lithograph of a canoe drawn up within a village on Erub, eastern Torres Strait, drawn by Harden Sidney Melville,1844-45

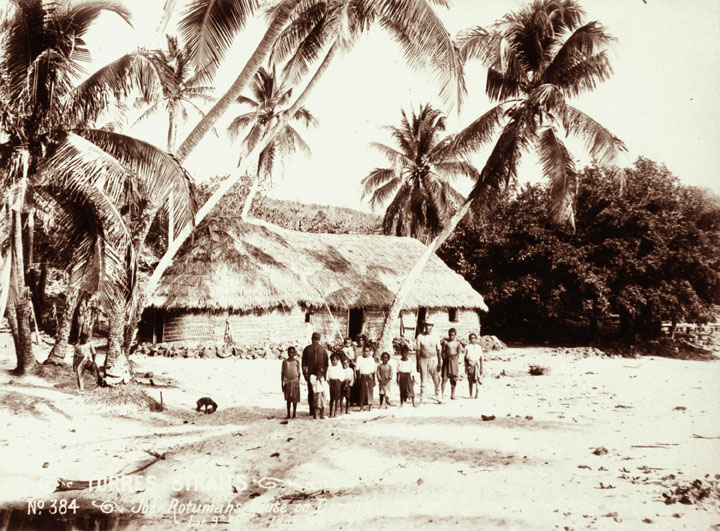
Joe Rotumah's house on Darnley Island with India rubber planted in 1890-1898

== See also ==
- Torres Strait Islanders
