= All Saints Anglican Church, Darnley Island =

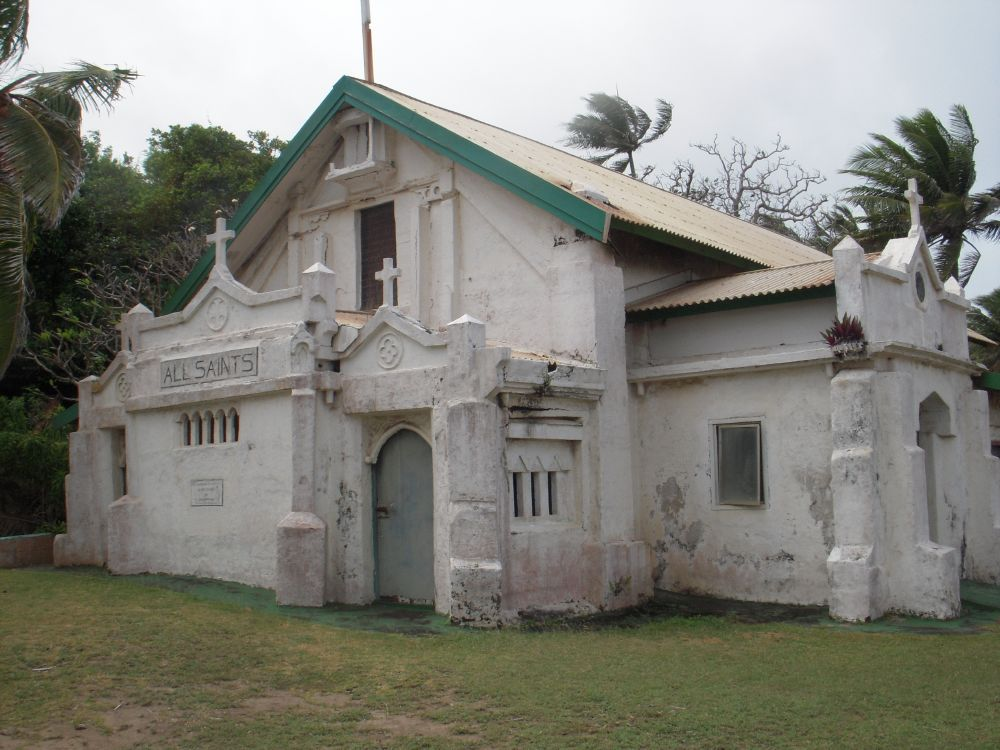
- All Saints Anglican Church, 2011

- Location within Queensland Location within Australia
- 9.5978°S 143.7629°E
- Location: Darnley Island, Torres Strait Island Region, Queensland, Australia

History
- Design period: 1870s–1890s (late 19th century)
- Built: 1919–1938

Site notes
- Architectural style: Romanesque

Queensland Heritage Register
- Official name: All Saints Anglican Church
- Type: state heritage (built, landscape)
- Designated: 21 October 1992
- Reference no.: 600873
- Significant period: 1870s–1920s (historical); 1910s–1940s (fabric)
- Significant components: apse, views to, trees/plantings, wall/s – sea, church

All Saints Anglican Church is a heritage-listed church at Darnley Island, Torres Strait Island Region, Queensland, Australia. It was built from 1919 to 1938. It was added to the Queensland Heritage Register on 21 October 1992.

== History ==
=== Coming of the Light ===
The first Christian missionary, representing the Society for the Propagation of the Gospel in Foreign Parts (SPG), arrived at the newly established settlement of Somerset, Cape York Peninsula, on 15 March 1867. Rev F.C. Jagg came with his family. A young English schoolteacher, W.T. Kennett, funded by the Queensland Government to establish a school at Somerset, accompanied Rev Jagg and started a mission school on 1 October 1867. A lack of funding, lack of support from the government administration, and dismay at the brutality of the police resulted in the mission being closed by June 1868.

In 1871 representatives of the London Missionary Society (LMS) arrived in the Torres Straits on the schooner Surprise, (Note: For further information about Surprise, see Torres Strait Islanders#Coming of the Light.) which had been chartered by the LMS, after the French Government had demanded their removal from the Loyalty Islands and New Caledonia in 1869. They decided to expand into the Torres Straits and New Guinea. They were represented by two Englishmen, Revs S. Macfarlane and Archibald Wright Murray, and eight Lifu (Loyalty Islander) evangelists: Tapeso, Elia, Mataika, Guchong, Kerisidui, Wauaded, Sevine and Josaia, and their wives.

The missionaries reached Erub (Darnley Island) on 1 July 1871, an event that came to be known as the "Coming of the Light". Dabad, one of the tribal elders of the island, met them at Kemus Beach. Dabad befriended the missionaries and introduced them to Amani, another tribal elder, and the rest of the Erub Islanders. His role in the bringing of Christianity to the Torres Straits is memorialised by Dabad's Monument at Badog. The inscription reads "In loving memory of Dabad 1871: A man who denied his tribal laws and accepted the good news of salvation".

South Sea Islanders had an important role working in the beche-de-mer and pearl farming industries in the Torres Straits and had established trading relations with the islanders long before the arrival of Surprise. Rotuma Islanders working there, who had encountered Christian missions at Rotuma and believed the missionaries to be cruel, evil and capable of selling people into slavery, reportedly warned the people of Erub against them.

Thorngreen, a European man, was living on Erub and accompanied Darnley Islanders on board Surprise the following day. As it was a Sunday, the missionaries held a service in Lifu language. This was the first recorded service in the Torres Straits (although Rev Jagg would have undoubtedly held services during his 12 months at Somerset). Two native evangelists, Mataika and Guchong, and their wives, were left on Erub on 5 July.

Surprise went on to Tudu (Warrior) Island.The missionaries were welcomed at Tudu by Captain Banner, who had an established pearl shell fishery on the island. John Joseph, one of his employees, travelled with the missionaries as an interpreter to Dauan Island on 6 July.

=== Expansion of Christianity ===
Finding that most of the islanders were away on Saibai Island, they were taken to Saibai by Nudai, the chief of Dauan. Two Lifu evangelists, Josaia and Sevine, were left at Saibai and Dauan, respectively. It was 1881 before the first substantial building for Christian worship was constructed at Saibai. In the early 20th century, it was replaced by the Holy Trinity Church, on which construction began about 1919 and was completed by about 1938.

Additional Lifu evangelists were left on Yorke and Yam Islands. With the English clergy still aboard, Surprise sailed to the newly established settlement at Somerset.

The London Missionary Society (LMS) established temporary headquarters at Somerset, from where they could expand their operations into other Torres Strait Islands and the mainland of New Guinea. Between 1871 and 1878 at least 131 Pacific Islander teachers, mainly from the Loyalty Islands, Cook Islands, Niue, Society Islands and Rurutu, taught in the Torres Straits and New Guinea, along with their wives and families. Only four European missionaries taught in the same period.

In 1872 the LMS revisited selected islands in the Torres Straits. They reported that the missionaries who had been left on Dauan and Saibai had been accepted into the local tribes and had been given land by the local chiefs. They reported weekly services were being held at Erub (Darnley), and were conducted in a pidgin form of the local language, Kala Lagaw Ya. Eventually a full creole language developed in the Torres Strait Islands.

The Queensland Government annexed the islands of the Torres Straits within 60 miles (97 km) of the mainland in 1872, followed by the remainder of the islands in 1879. It feared that rival colonial powers could take control of what had become an important shipping route. Annexation also gave the government control over the increasingly lucrative beche-de-mer and pearl shelling economies and, in particular, regulating the use of Torres Strait and South Sea Islander labour in these industries.

The government moved its administration centre from Somerset to Thursday Island in 1877. But the lack of government resources, such as a regular patrol boat, meant that effectively administration of the islands was conducted by the London Missionary Society.

The Society established the Papuan Institute on the island of Mer as a theological facility to train Torres Strait Islanders as Episcopal priests. The Society selected the students. It closed the Institute in 1888, but by then a number of local priests had been trained who were familiar with both formal missionary teaching and the local Islander customs.

=== LMS moves on ===
By 1890 the London Missionary Society began to reduce its operations in the Torres Straits. Conversion on the islands had been successful, and they considered Papua their next area of endeavour. A full-time superintendent on the islands was no longer deemed necessary. The incumbent priest, Rev J Chalmers, moved to Saguane in the Fly River in New Guinea. The Queensland Government appointed teacher/supervisors on various islands. In 1904 the Protector of Aborigines assumed comprehensive control of Islanders' lives under the Queensland Aboriginals Protection and Restriction of the Sale of Opium Act 1897.

Worship on various islands was led by the Islander priests who had been trained at the Papuan Institute. Annual inspections were made by LMS representatives travelling from New Guinea.

In 1914 the secretary of the London Missionary Society requested that the Bishop of Carpentaria, Gilbert White, take over the missionary work in the Torres Strait due to financial pressure. The Australian Board of Missions in November 1914 accepted this and the Anglican Church assumed responsibility for the Torres Strait Mission. All the leases granted to the LMS, including the buildings, were transferred to the Anglican Church.

Soon after this transfer, the Anglican Church instituted annual "Coming of the Light" celebrations, as a tribute to the London Missionary Society and perhaps as a way of ensuring continuity of worship. This anniversary continues to be celebrated annually by Torres Strait Islanders, both in the Strait and in Torres Strait Islander communities on the Australian mainland. Kemus Beach, on Erub, is a particularly important center for these Coming of the Light celebrations. This was the site of the first contact between Torres Strait Islanders and representatives of the London Missionary Society. That event is memorialised by a Coming of the Light monument, consisting of a 3.5-metre (11 ft) high white cross standing in a ship named Surprise as its base. Coming of the Light, an episode in the 2013 documentary television series Desperate Measures, features the annual event.

=== All Saints construction ===
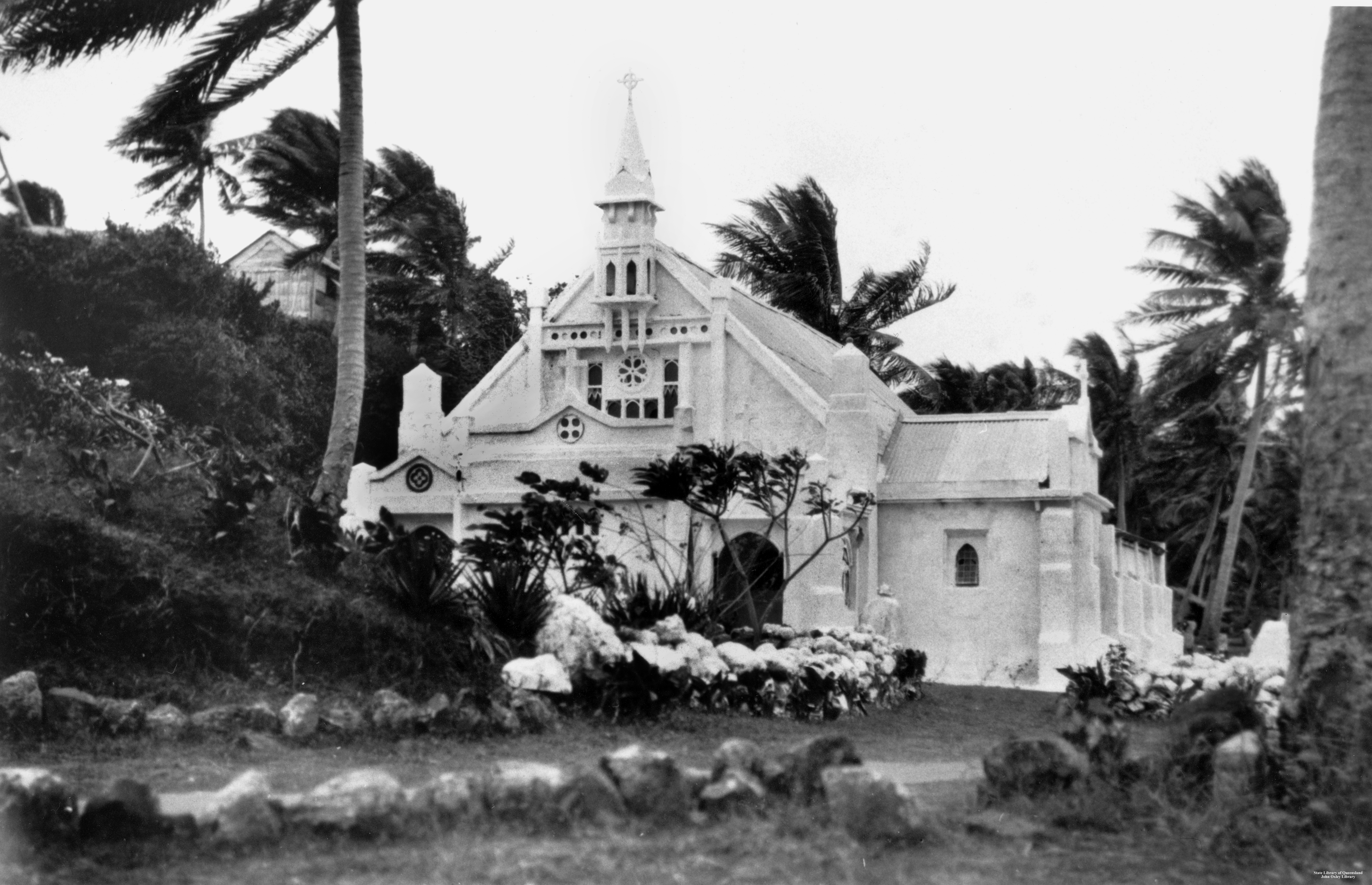
Church, 1934

In 1919 the All Saints Church was constructed at the former site of the original London Missionary Society mission house and school. Locally produced lime from burnt coral and basalt was used and the work was done under the direction of Manai, an Erub Islander, and Ware, a South Sea Islander. It was originally known as the Ziona church.

In 1963 the Church of England, now the Anglican Church, remodelled this building with limestone from surrounding coral reefs. The roofline was raised and internal walls extended. Erosion of the beach over time has threatened the preservation of the building. In 1976 a stone sea wall was constructed approximately 15 metres (49 ft) from the building in an effort to protect it from erosion from the strong tides.

== Description ==
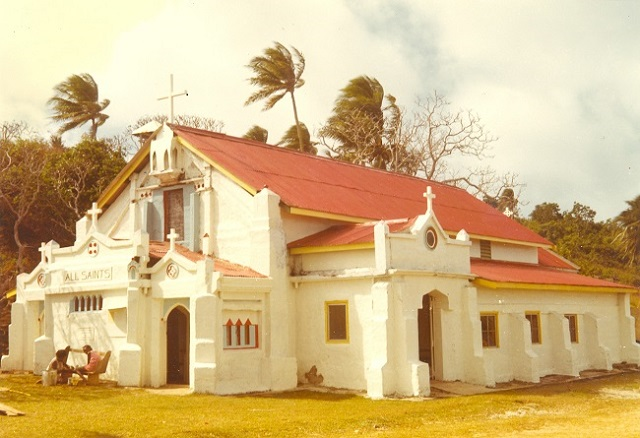
All Saints' Church, 1971

All Saints Church is a mass concrete structure with a timber framed red corrugated asbestos cement and galvanized steel roof, located 5–15 metres (16–49 ft) from Badog Beach on the south west side of Erub (Darnley) Island in the Torres Straits.

The area of the building is about 250 square metres (2,700 sq ft), featuring a central nave with side wings. Walls, constructed of concrete, vary in thickness from 300 to 450 millimetres (12 to 18 in) and are plastered internally and externally. Internal walls between the nave and the wings of the building are rendered white and feature columned arches. The floor is concrete.

The facade of the building, facing east, is decorated with a niche, projecting columns and beams, frieze and other architectural features. The main entrance is on the southern side of the side of the building, through one of the side wings. External walls of the side wings are buttressed at the corners and intermediary points. The sanctuary is at the western end of the building with a vestry extending to the southern side of it.

The building is located on a small level area between the beach and the north east headland of Badog Beach. The vegetation includes mature coconut palms and a natural forest setting.

== Heritage listing ==
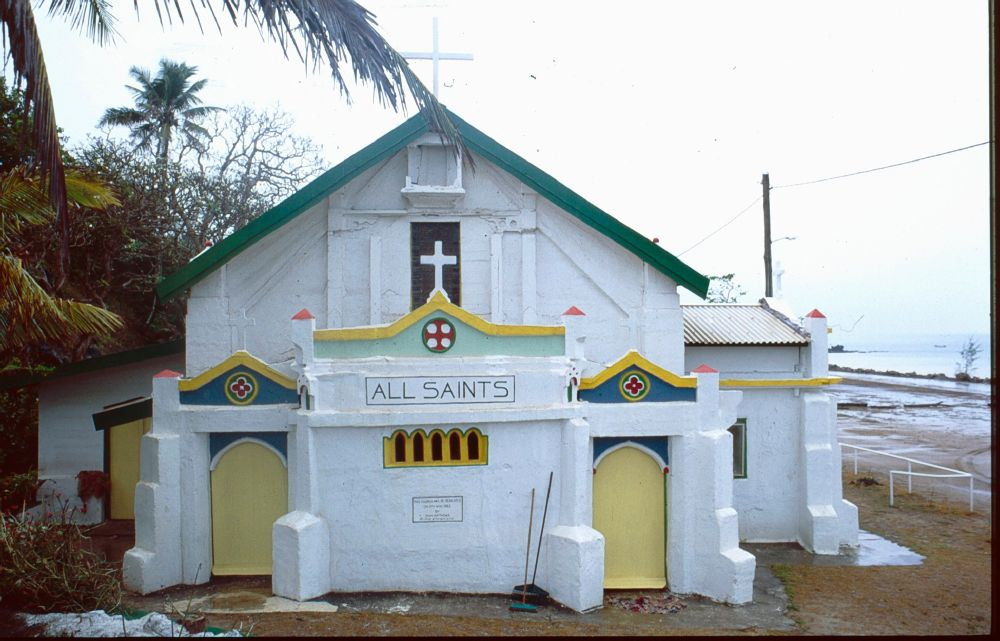
Church, 1996

All Saints Anglican Church was listed on the Queensland Heritage Register on 21 October 1992 having satisfied the following criteria.

The place is important in demonstrating the evolution or pattern of Queensland's history.

All Saints Church, Erub (Darnley) Island, survives as important evidence of the development of missionary activity in the Torres Straits and serves as a focus for the annual July 1 "Coming of the Light" festival that celebrates the arrival of the London Missionary Society in the Torres Straits in 1871.

The place is important because of its aesthetic significance.

The substantial building, constructed in 1919 mainly of locally acquired materials including burnt coral and basalt, forms a prominent landmark in the architecture of Erub (Darnley) Island. It has aesthetic significance through its prominent siting on Badog Beach and as an example of the vernacular architectural style of churches in the Torres Straits that includes projected corners and beams and buttressed corners and cement construction material.

The place has a strong or special association with a particular community or cultural group for social, cultural or spiritual reasons.

Erub (Darnley Island) has a strong and special religious significance with Torres Strait Islander Christians as the first place of contact between Torres Strait Islanders and London Missionary Society missionaries.
