= Saibai Island =

Suburb of Torres Strait Island Region, Queensland, Australia

Native name: Saibai (Torres Strait Creole) Saibai (Tok Pisin) Saybay (Kala Lagaw Ya)
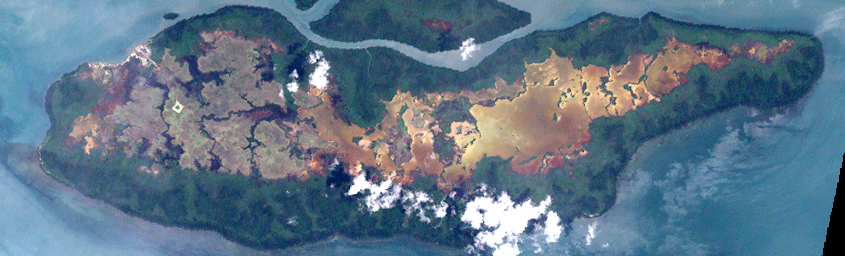
- Landsat image of Saibai Island

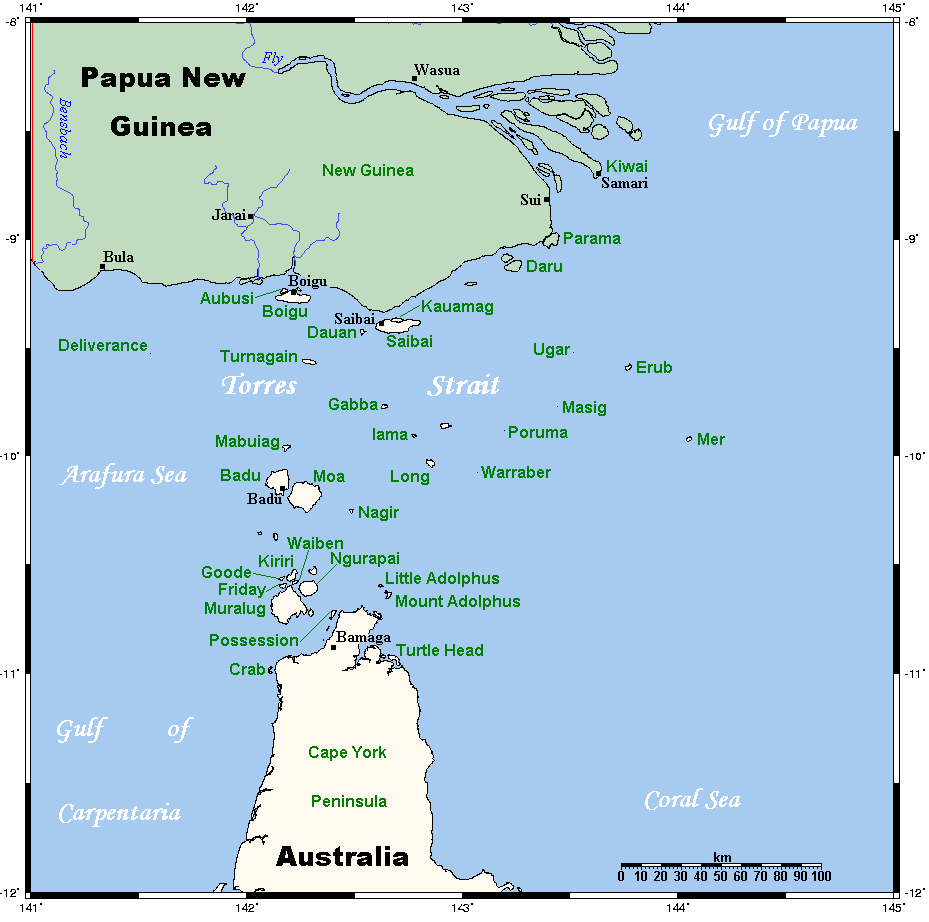
- A map of the Torres Strait Islands showing Saibai in the north central waters of Torres Strait

Geography
- Coordinates: 9.3969°S 142.6988°E
- Archipelago: Torres Strait Islands
- Adjacent to: Torres Strait
- Major islands: Saibai, Kauamag
- Area: 107.9 km^{2} (41.7 sq mi)
- Length: 21.8 km (13.55 mi)
- Width: 5.2 km (3.23 mi)
- Highest elevation: 1.7 m (5.6 ft)
- Highest point: unnamed

Administration
- Australia
- State: Queensland
- Local government area: Torres Strait Islands Regional Council
- Island Region: Top Western
- Largest settlement: Saibai (pop. 171)

Demographics
- Population: 340 (2021 census)
- Ethnic groups: Torres Strait Islanders

Saibai Island
- Suburb
- Interactive map of Saibai Island
- Country: Australia
- State: Queensland
- LGA: Torres Strait Island Region

Government
  - State electorate: Cook
  - Federal division: Leichhardt

Area
  - Total: 102.5 km^{2} (39.6 sq mi)

Population
  - Total: 340 (2021 census)
  - Density: 3.32/km^{2} (8.59/sq mi)
- Time zone: UTC+10:00 (AEST)
- Postcode: 4875
Suburbs around Saibai Island
Boigu Island	Papua New Guinea	Torres Strait
Torres Strait	Saibai Island	Torres Strait
Torres Strait	Torres Strait	Torres Strait

Saibai Island, commonly called Saibai (Kala Lagaw Ya: Saybay, Saibai, Saibe), is an island of the Torres Strait Islands archipelago, located in the Torres Strait of Queensland, Australia. The island is situated north of the Australian mainland and south of the island of New Guinea. The island is a locality within the Torres Strait Island Region local government area. The town of Saibai is located on the north-west coast of the island.

Most of the island is held under native title, apart from some government infrastructure and historic buildings.

In the 2021 census, Saibai Island had a population of 340 people.

== Geography ==
The island was formed by alluvial deposits from Papua New Guinean rivers.

Saibai is a fairly large low-lying island located 4 kilometres (2.5 mi) south of the Papua New Guinea mainland. Close to the north of Saibai is the uninhabited Kauamag, separated from Saibai by a channel that is 7 kilometres (4.3 mi) long, between 180 and 650 metres (590 and 2,130 ft) wide, and nearly blocked at its east end.

The island is about 21.8 kilometres (13.5 mi) in length by 5.2 kilometres (3.2 mi) in width, and is flat, predominantly mangrove swamplands, with the highest point being 1.7 metres (5 ft 7 in) above mean sea level, and prone to flooding during the wet season, which coincides with king tides. A bitumen airstrip allows year-round access.

Saibai is part of the north-western island group of Torres Strait, which consists of the Saibai, Dauan and Boigu islands. Saibai lies approximately 5 kilometres (3.1 mi) off the coast of New Guinea and is approximately 20 kilometres (12 mi) long and 6 kilometres (3.7 mi) wide. The island is an average of 1 m above sea level and consists largely of mangrove fringe, flood plain and brackish swamps. The island is vulnerable to flooding and rising sea levels, particularly during the wet season when around 2 m of water regularly falls onto the island. During the dry season however, the island experiences drought-like conditions.

The main village of Saibai, in the northwest, has a population of 171. The second village, Churum [Surum White Sand], in the southwest, numbers 128.

== History ==
=== European contact ===
In 1606, Luís Vaz de Torres sailed through Torres Strait islands, navigating them, along New Guinea's southern coast.

In the 1860s, beche-de-mer (sea cucumber) and pearling boats began working the reefs of Torres Strait. The first European to visit Saibai was probably a beche-de-mer operator named John Delargy, who visited the island with his South Sea Islander crew in 1869 while searching for a lost whaleboat. Delargy established friendly relations with the people of Saibai, trading goods and sharing a feast with the Islanders. Pearling bases were never established on Saibai but in the 1870s European pearl and beche-de-mer operators began recruiting men from Saibai to work on their luggers.

Torres Strait Islanders refer to the arrival of London Missionary Society (LMS) missionaries at Erub in July 1871 as the "Coming of the Light". After visiting Darnley Island and Tudu, the LMS missionaries led by Rev. Samuel McFarlane and Reverend A.W. Murray travelled to Mt Cornwallis Island (now Dauan Island) and Saibai islands. Two South Sea Islander lay pastors named Josaia and Sivene were appointed to work as missionary teachers at Mt Cornwallis and Saibai. LMS missionaries revisited Mt Cornwallis and Saibai in 1872 and found that Josaia and Sivene had been accepted by the Islanders and given land by the local chiefs. However, increased contact with the outside world brought new diseases to the islands and, during the 1870s, a measles epidemic significantly reduced the population of Saibai.

In 1872, the Queensland Government sought to extend its jurisdiction and requested the support of the British Government. Letters Patent were issued by the British government in 1872 creating a new boundary for the colony which encompassed all islands within a 60 nautical mile radius of the coast of Queensland. This boundary was further extended to 96 kilometres (60 mi) by the Queensland Coast Islands Act 1879 (Qld). It included the islands of Boigu, Darnley, Murray and Saibai, which lay beyond the previous 60 nautical mile limit. The new legislation enabled the Queensland Government to control and regulate bases for the beche-de-mer and pearling industries, which previously had operated outside its jurisdiction.

From the late 1870s onwards, the coastal communities of Papua and the islands of Saibai, Boigu and Mt Cornwallis were raided by warriors of the Marind-Anim or Tugeri people from Dutch-controlled West Papua. A retaliatory expedition led by British officials based in Daru in 1896 diminished the threat of the Marind-Anim but sporadic raids on Saibai, Boigu and Mt Cornwallis islands and Papua continued well into the 1920s.

The English scientist and anthropologist Alfred Cort Haddon first visited the Torres Straits in 1888. Haddon originally came to the Torres Straits to study the coral reefs but soon became fascinated by the traditional culture and way of life of the Torres Strait Islander people. Haddon returned to the Torres Straits in 1898 with the Cambridge University anthropological expedition. The Cambridge expedition spent 7 months in the Torres Straits including a stay at Saibai, documenting the Torres Strait Islander people and their culture. The expedition collected artefacts, took down genealogies, re-created ceremonies and used wax cylinders and early movie cameras to make the first sound recordings and films in the Torres Strait.

Over time, the Queensland Government began to exert more influence on the lives of Torres Strait Islander people. John Douglas, the government Resident at Thursday Island, initially shielded Torres Strait Islanders from the controlling provisions of the Aboriginal Protection and Restriction of the Sale of Opium Act 1897. After Douglas died in 1904, the administration that followed began to assert control over Torres Strait Islander labour and savings accounts and imposed restrictions on Islander movement to and from the mainland.

In November 1912, an area of 35,000 acres of land on Saibai was officially gazetted as an Aboriginal reserve by the Queensland Government. Many other Torres Strait Islands were gazetted as Aboriginal reserves at the same time. Shortages of food on Saibai were mentioned in a government report dating from 1912. Between 1914 and 1918, a cargo cult known as "German Wislin" emerged on Saibai. The Wislin believers predicted that the Germans would win World War One and reward the people of Saibai with a cargo of gifts which would be brought to the island by steamer. After Britain and her allies defeated Germany in 1918, the Wislin movement died away.

During the 1920s and 1930s racial legislation was strictly applied to Torres Strait Islanders enabling the government to remove Islanders to reserves and mission across Queensland. A small number of documented removals from Saibai occurred between 1909 and 1941; 2 people were removed to Palm Island and 1 person was taken to Yarrabah.

In 1936, around 70% of the Torres Strait Islander workforce went on strike in the first organised challenge against government authority made by Torres Strait Islanders. The nine-month strike was an expression of Islanders' anger and resentment at increasing government control of their livelihoods. The strike was a protest against government interference in wages, trade and commerce and also called for the lifting of evening curfews, the removal of the permit system for inter-island travel and the recognition of Islanders' right to recruit their own boat crews. Three men were jailed on Saibai in 1936 by the authorities after strike protests occurred on the island.

The strike produced a number of significant reforms and innovations. Unpopular local Protector J D McLean was removed and replaced by Cornelius O’Leary who established a system of regular consultations with elected Islander council representatives. The new Island councils were given a degree of autonomy, including control over local police and courts.

On 23 August 1937, O’Leary convened the first Inter Islander Councillors Conference at Masig. Representatives from 14 Torres Strait communities attended the conference. Namabai Atu, Mareko, Soki and Enosa represented Saibai at the conference. After lengthy discussions, unpopular bylaws (including the evening curfews) were cancelled and a new code of local representation was agreed upon. In 1939, the Queensland Government passed the Torres Strait Islander Act 1939, which incorporated many of the recommendations discussed at the conference. A key section of the new act officially recognised Torres Strait Islanders as a separate people from Aboriginal Australians.

During World War Two, the Australian Government recruited Torres Strait Islander men to serve in the armed forces. Enlisted men from Saibai and other island communities formed the Torres Strait Light Infantry. While the Torres Strait Light Infantry were respected as soldiers, they only received one third of the pay given to white Australian servicemen.

On 31 December 1943, members of the Torres Strait Light Infantry went on strike calling for equal pay and equal rights. The Australian Government agreed to increase their pay to two-thirds the level received by white servicemen. Full back pay was offered in compensation to the Torres Strait servicemen by the Australian Government in the 1980s.

At the end of World War Two, the Queensland Government introduced measures to compensate Torres Strait Islanders for their contribution to the war effort and to populate the north as a defence against foreign invasion. After the war, enlisted Torres Strait Islander men from Saibai, Boigu and Mt Cornwallis islands also discussed the possibility of developing a community on the mainland. Saibai elder, Bamaga Ginau, supported the proposal.

In 1947, king tides caused serious damage to properties and gardens across Saibai. The village of Saibai was totally flooded by 10 metres (33 ft) of water. Erosion and a lack of freshwater were concerns. Bamaga Ginau called a meeting regarding the future of Saibai and after much discussion a number of families made the decision to leave Saibai and move to the Cape York Peninsula.

The first families left Saibai on the pearl luggers Millard and Macoy and arrived at Muttee Heads in June 1947, where they established a temporary settlement in abandoned army facilities. In July 1948, the Queensland Government gazetted 44,500 acres extending from Red Island Point to Kennedy Inlet and the Cowal Creek mission, as a reserve for the use of the Torres Strait Islanders.

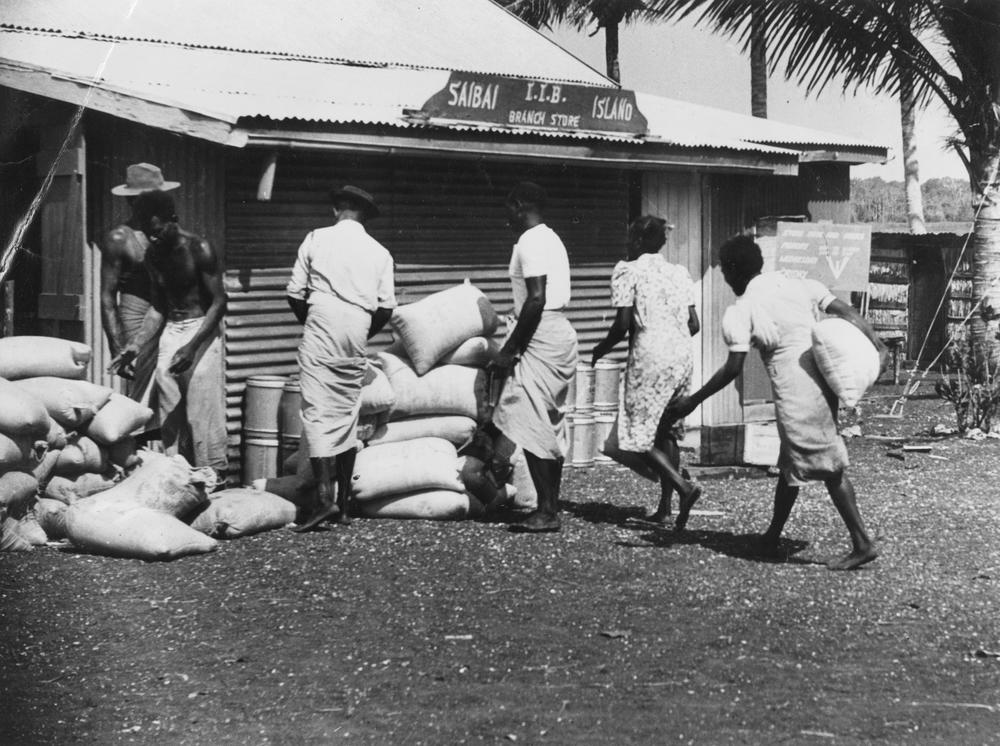
Saibai women help unload produce for the general store on Saibai Island, 1952. The Saibai Island I.I.B. Store is being re-stocked with produce. Several women and men are unloading sacks and barrels and taking them to the store.

In 1948, Mugai Elu and Tumena Sagaukaz left Saibai with their families and moved to Red Island Point. The Islanders at Muttee Heads relocated to a new settlement inland from Red Island Point in 1952. The new settlement was named Bamaga in honour of the leader of the migration, Bamaga Ginau. The smaller community at Red Island Point changed its name to Seisia in 1977.

After gaining its independence from Australia in 1975, Papua New Guinea asserted its right to the islands and waters of the Torres Straits. In December 1978, a treaty was signed by the Australian and Papua New Guinea governments that described the boundaries between the 2 countries and the use of the sea area by both parties. The Torres Strait Treaty, which operated from February 1985, contains special provision for free movement (without passports or visas) between both countries. There is constant traffic throughout the year between Saibai and Papua New Guinea. Free movement between communities applies to traditional activities, such as fishing, trading and family gatherings, which occur in a specifically created Protected Zone and nearby areas. The Protected Zone also assists in the preservation and protection of the land, sea, air and native plant and animal life of the Torres Strait.

=== Local government ===
Flag of Saibai Island

On 30 March 1985, the Saibai community elected three councillors to constitute an autonomous Saibai Council established under the Community Services (Torres Strait) Act 1984. This Act conferred local government type powers and responsibilities upon Torres Strait Islander councils for the first time. The council area, previously an Aboriginal reserve held by the Queensland Government, was transferred on 21 October 1985 to the trusteeship of the council under a Deed of Grant in Trust.

In March 2000, the elections for the Saibai Council were conducted on a clan basis. Seven councillors were elected to represent each of the 7 traditional clans. Each clan elected its own councillor. This system of representation has been maintained for the Saibai community forum.

In 2007, the Local Government Reform Commission recommended that the 15 Torres Strait Island councils be abolished and the Torres Strait Island Regional Council (TSIRC) be established in their place. In elections conducted under the Local Government Act 1993 on 15 March 2008, members of the 15 communities comprising the TSIRC local government area each voted for a local councillor and a mayor to constitute a council consisting of 15 councillors plus a mayor.

In January 2012, very high tides inundated the island's cemetery and damaged sacred gravesites.

== Demographics ==
The language spoken on Saibai is Kalaw Kawaw Ya (KKY), also called Saibailgau Ya. Saibai Islanders have always traded and had good relations with neighbouring Papuans as well as all island groups in Torres Strait. The Saibai Islanders converted to Christianity in 1871 with the arrival of the London Missionary Society.

Saibai, Boigu and Dauan society is Buwai "clan/moiety" based, there being two major Buwai (moieties), the Koei Buwai "Senior Moiety" and the Moegina Buwai "Junior Moiety"; each moiety is divided into totemic subclans, such as the Samu Augadh "Cassowary Totem" (Koei Buwai), Koedal Augadh "Crocodile Totem" (Moegina Buwai) and others. All social, food gathering, family business and traditional religion circles around clan relationships.

The Saibaians have been legally acknowledged as being the traditional owners of Saibai.

They are of Melanesian origin and lived in village communities following traditional patterns of hunting, fishing, agriculture and trade for many thousands of years before contact was made with the first European, Asian and Pacific Island visitors to the region. Strong kinship and trade ties exist between the people of Saibai, Mt Cornwallis and Boigu Island, as well as other speakers of the Kalaw Lagaw Ya dialects, with less strong but still important ties with the neighbouring Papuan communities, including East Torres Strait.

=== 2016 census ===
Only a small proportion of the island is inhabited. In the 2016 census, Saibai Island had a population of 465 people. 84.0% of people were born in Australia. Torres Strait Islander and Aboriginal people made up 85.6% of the population, with 70% of the population claiming Torres Strait Islander ancestry. The most common response for religion was Anglican at 44.9%.

Ancestry	Number	Percentage
Torres Strait Islanders	360	70.0%
(Papua New Guinea) Papua New Guinean	82	16.0%
(Australia) Australian	10	2.9%
Aboriginal	4	0.8%
(England) English	4	0.8%

Birthplace	Number	Percentage
Australia	389	84.0%
Papua New Guinea	52	11.2%

79.5% of households in Saibai spoke a language other than English at home.

Language	Number	Percentage
Kala Lagaw Ya	108	23.1%
Torres Strait Creole	70	15.0%
English	20	4.3%

93.0% of Saibai Islanders follow Christianity.

Religion	Number	Percentage
Anglicanism	213	44.9%
Not stated (Note: The religion question in the 2016 Australian census was optional, therefore many people did not state their religion.)	65	13.7%
Catholicism	58	12.2%
Christianity (not further defined)	33	7.0%
Uniting Church	29	6.1%

=== 2021 census ===
In the 2021 census, Saibai Island had a population of 340 people.

== Education ==
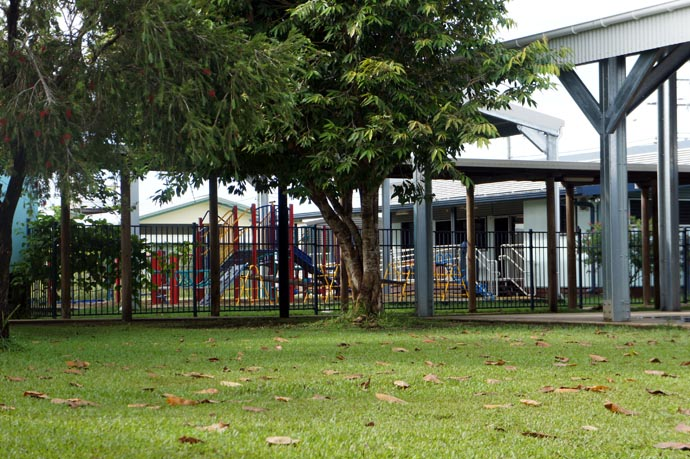
Saibai Island campus of Tagai State College, 2024

Saibai Island Campus is a primary (Early Childhood-6) school at 5 School Road (9.3794°S 142.6239°E), part of the Tagai State College which has 17 campuses throughout the Torres Strait.

There is no secondary school on the island; the nearest is on Thursday Island.

== Heritage listings ==
Saibai Island has a number of heritage-listed sites, including the Holy Trinity Church (9.3803°S 142.6194°E).

== See also ==
- Birds of Boigu, Saibai and Dauan Islands (Torres Strait)
- List of Torres Strait Islands
- Saibai Island Airport
