= Saibai, Queensland =

Saibai Queensland
- Coordinates: 9.3808°S 142.62°E
- Population: 340 (2021 census)
- Postcode(s): 4875
- Time zone: AEST (UTC+10:00)
- LGA(s): Torres Strait Island Region
- State electorate(s): Cook
- Federal division(s): Leichhardt

Saibai is a town within the locality of Saibai Island in the Torres Strait Island Region, Queensland, Australia. In the 2021 census, the town of Saibai had a population of 340 people.

== History ==
Kala Kawaw Ya (also known as Kalaw Kawaw, KKY) is one of the languages of the Torres Strait. Kala Kawaw Ya is the traditional language owned by the Top Western islands of the Torres Strait. The Kala Kawaw Ya language region includes the landscape within the local government boundaries of the Torres Shire Council.

It is believed that there was a school on island since about 1900. It was possibly a mission school during the 1930s.

On 29 January 1985, Saibai Island State School opened. In 2007 it became that Saibai Island campus of the Tagai State School (now Tagai State College) which operates on numerous island in the Torres Strait.

== Demographics ==
In the 2016 census, the town of Saibai had a population of 465 people, the same as the island as a whole.

In the 2021 census, the town of Saibai had a population of 340 people, the same as the island as a whole.

== Education ==
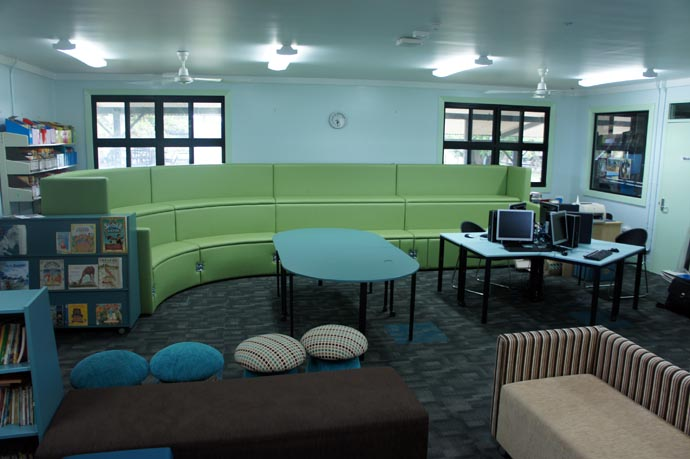
Saibai Island campus of Tagai State College, 2024

The Saibai Island campus of the Tagai State College is a government primary school (Prep-6) for boys and girls at 5 School Road (9.37953°S 142.62462°E).
