= Nggem people =

Ethnic group in Indonesia

Gem

Total population
- 4,500

Regions with significant populations
- Indonesia (Highland Papua)

Languages
- Nggem, Papuan Malay, and Indonesian

Religion
- Christianity

Related ethnic groups
- Dani, Lani, Nduga, Walak, Wano, Yali

The Nggem people (Nggem: Gem) are an ethnic group of indigenous origin who inhabit the areas around Kobakma and Kelila in the Central Mamberamo Regency of Highland Papua, Indonesia. Their territory is bordered by the Taborta people to the north, the Lani people to the west, the Walak people to the south, and the Yali people to the east.

The Nggem speak the Nggem language, a language in the Baliem Valley language family. Most Nggem people are Christians, with the influence of ancestral beliefs still clearly present. Culturally, they are closely related to other ethnic groups in the La Pago traditional area, such as the Dani, Lani, Yali, Nduga, Walak, and others.

== Etymology ==
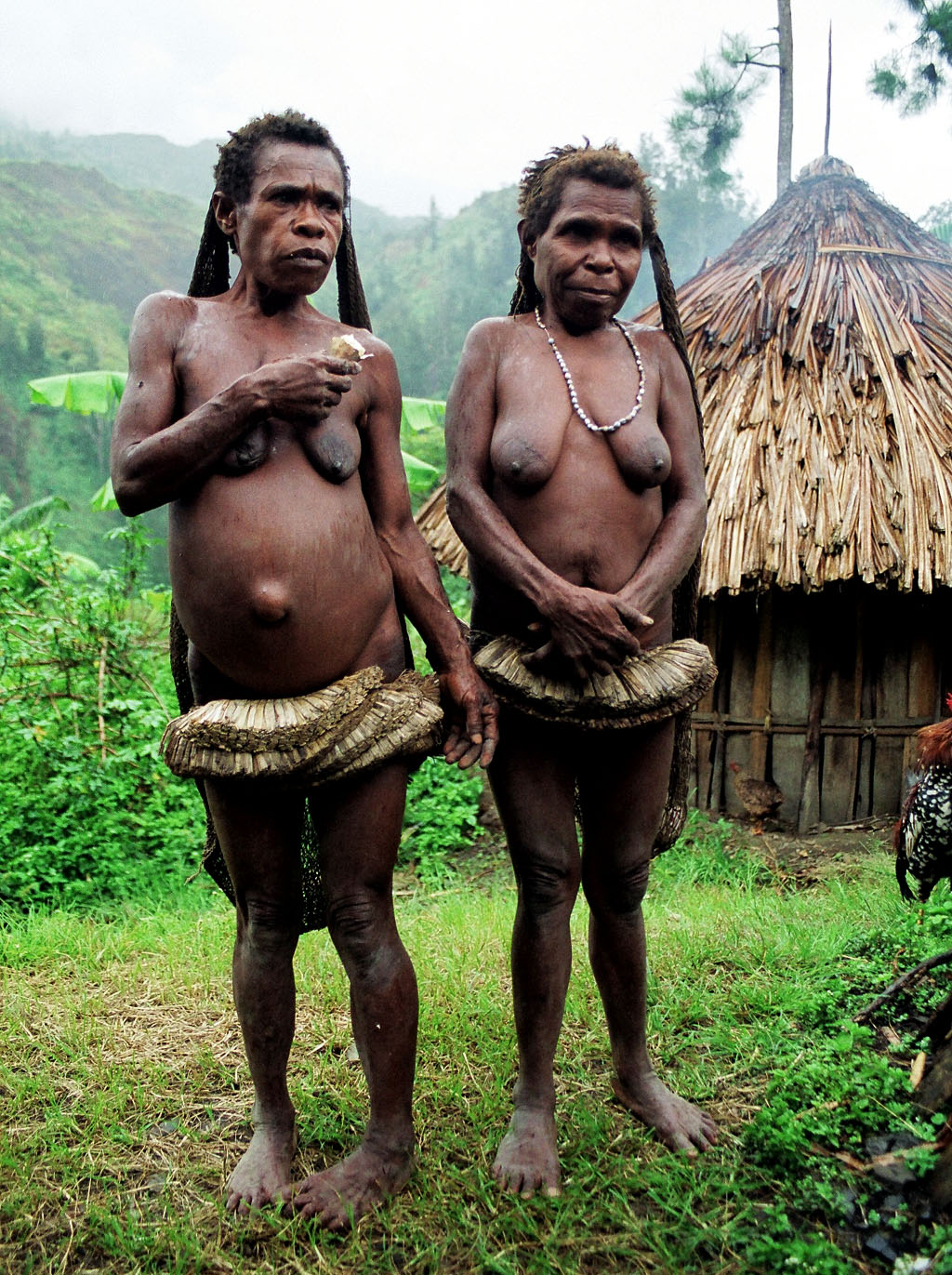
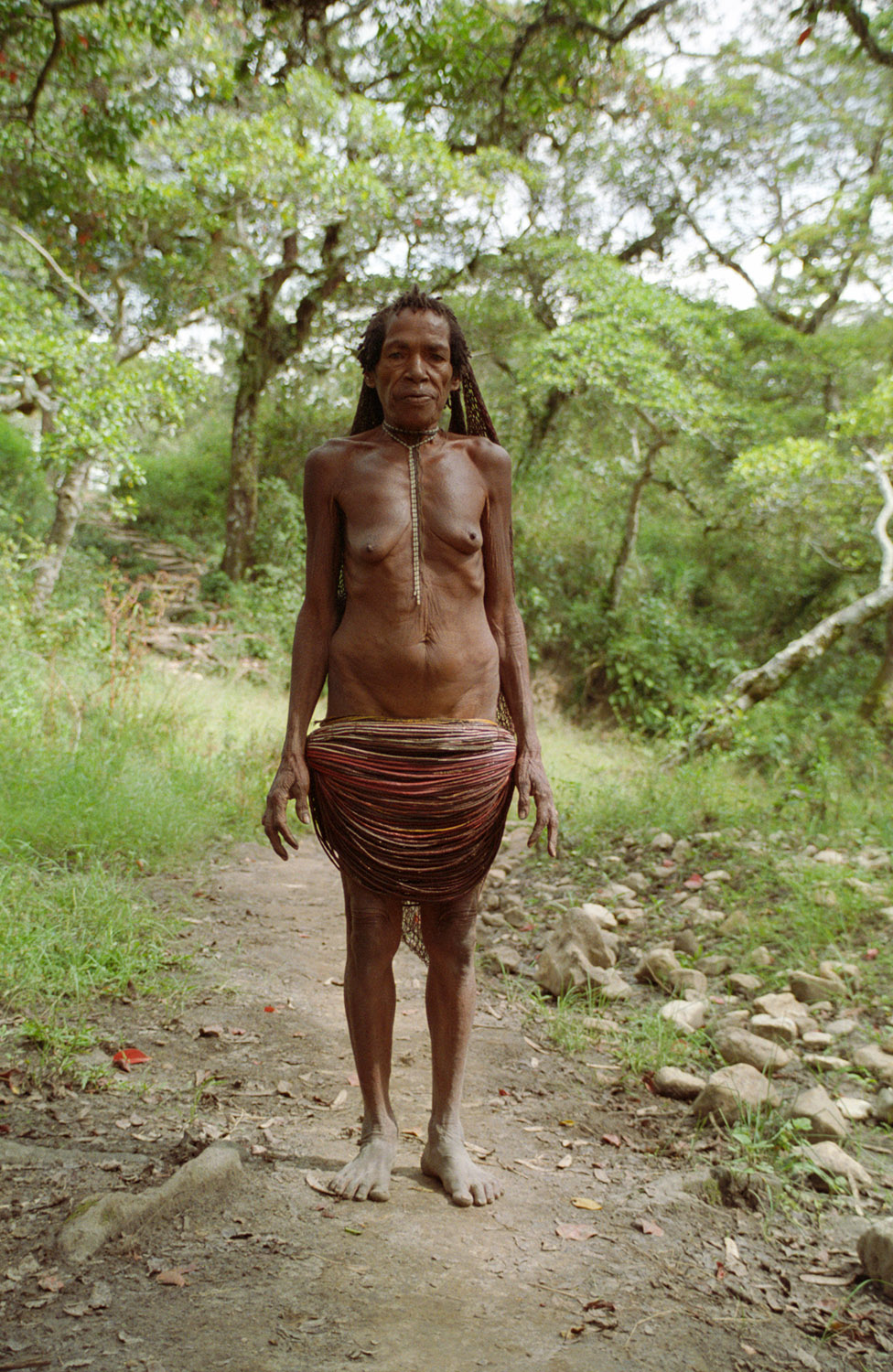
Differences between the gem skirt (left) of the Nggem and the yokal skirt (right) of the Dani

The name nggem or gem comes from the short grass skirt traditionally worn by women. The Nggem refer to the Dani people using the word yonggal (id) (Dani: yokal), meaning a skirt made from horizontal strips of fiber from the ficus tree that Dani women wear after marriage. In the Lani language, the word nggem also means "thief."

== Language ==
The Nggem speak the Nggem language, which forms its own small subgroup within the Baliem Valley languages (Dani group). Villages in the western part of Nggem territory may also speak the Lani language, and as a result the Nggem language shows significant influence from Lani.

According to Etherington’s research, more Nggem people can speak the languages of neighboring groups than the reverse. This is because the Nggem are a small population and their language is considered less prestigious, while other groups often have difficulty distinguishing certain Nggem sounds such as implosives, fricatives, and voiceless palatal fricative consonants.
