= NBQ =

NBQ or nbq may refer to:

- NBQ, the Indian Railways station code for New Bongaigaon Junction railway station, Assam, India
- nbq, the ISO 639-3 code for Nggem language, Highland Papua, Indonesia
