= Torres Strait Islanders =

One of the two categories of Indigenous Australians

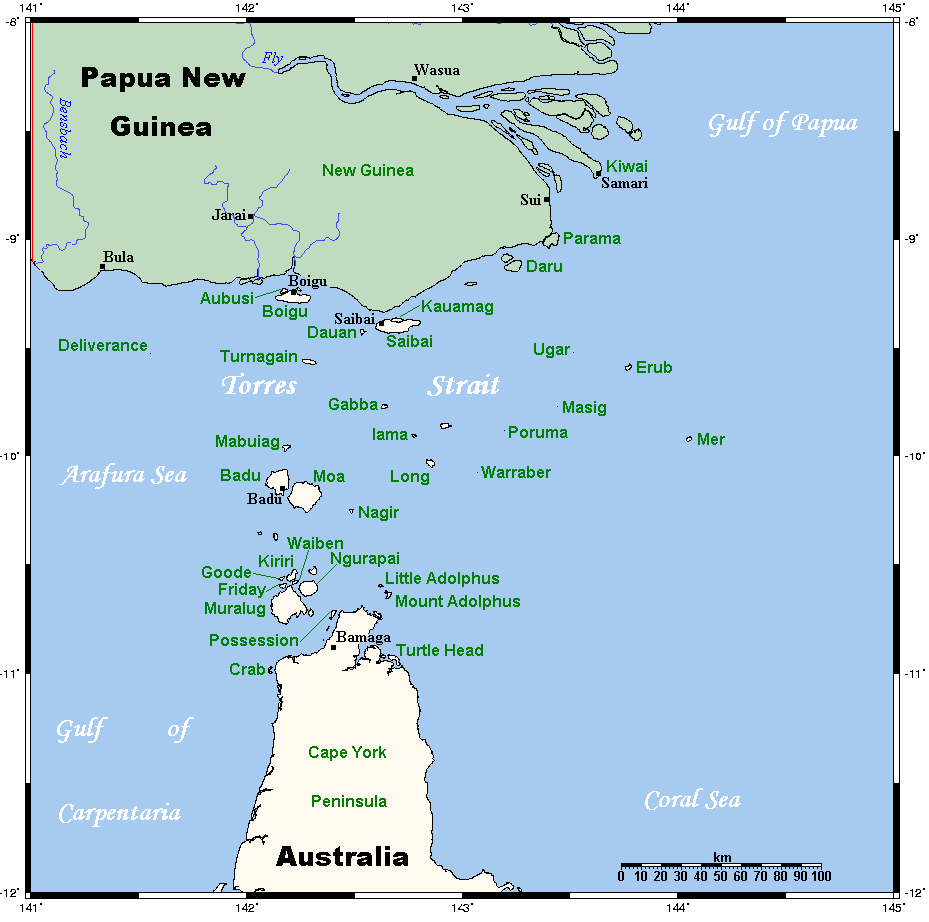

Total population
- 82,054 (2021)

Regions with significant populations
- Torres Strait Islands 3,577

Languages
- Torres Strait Island languages, Torres Strait Creole, Torres Strait English, Australian English

Religion
- Christianity (85.5%), traditional beliefs (2%)

Related ethnic groups
- Other Aboriginal Australians, Papuans, Melanesians

Torres Strait Islanders (/ˈtɒrɪs/ TORR-iss) are the Indigenous Melanesian peoples of the Torres Strait Islands, which are part of the state of Queensland, Australia. Ethnically distinct from the Aboriginal peoples of the rest of Australia, they are often grouped with them as Indigenous Australians. Today, many more Torres Strait Islander people live in mainland Australia than on the islands.

Five distinct peoples exist within the broader designation of Torres Strait Islander people, based partly on geographical and cultural divisions. Kalaw Lagaw Ya and Meriam Mir comprise the two main Indigenous language groups; Yumplatok is also widely spoken as a language of trade and commerce. The core of Island culture is Papuan, and the people are traditionally a seafaring nation. Torres Strait Islanders exhibit a strong artistic culture, particularly in sculpture, printmaking, and mask-making.

== Demographics ==
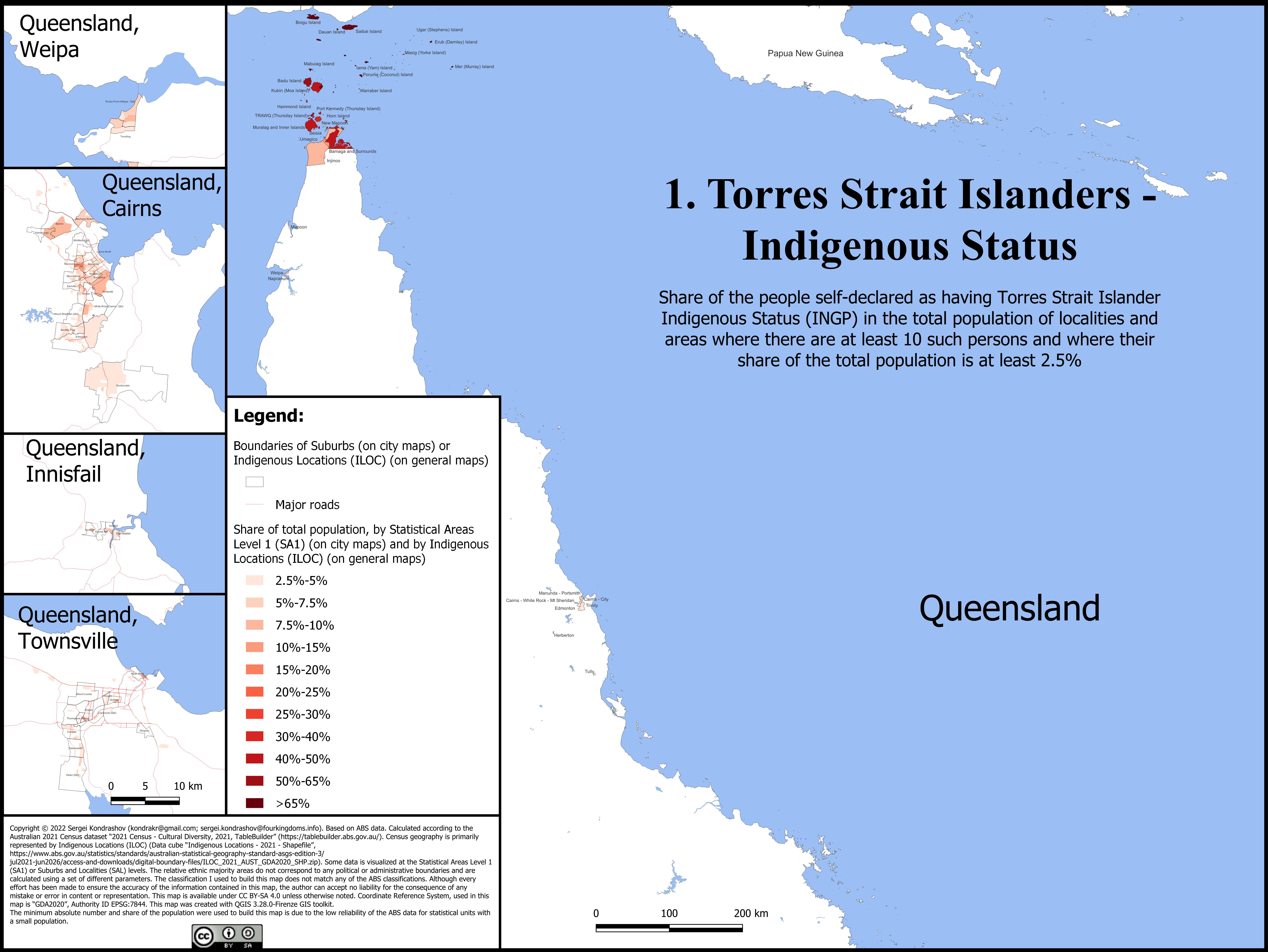
Geographical distribution of people with Torres Strait Islander Indigenous status

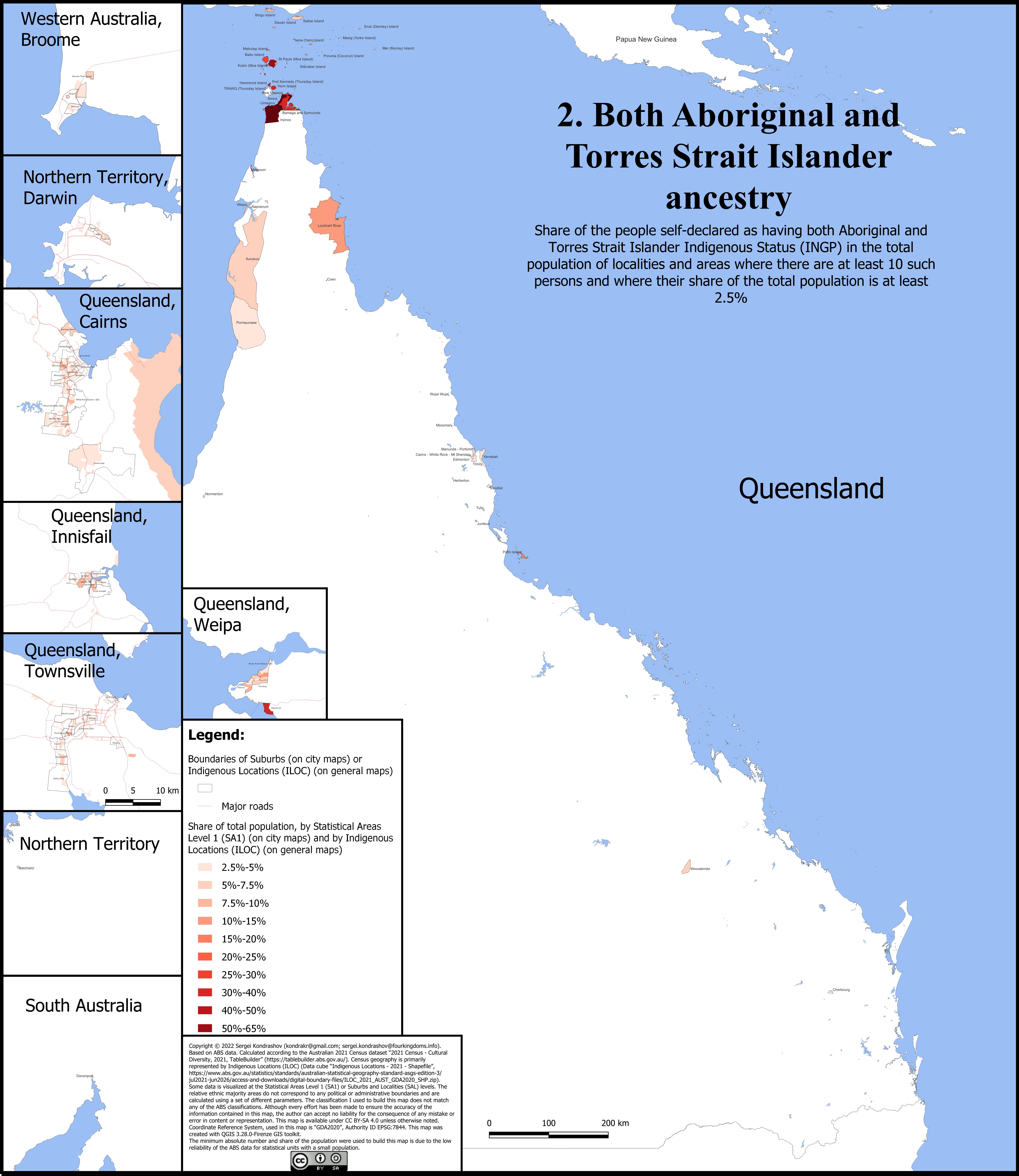
Geographical distribution of people with both Aboriginal and Torres Strait Islander Indigenous status

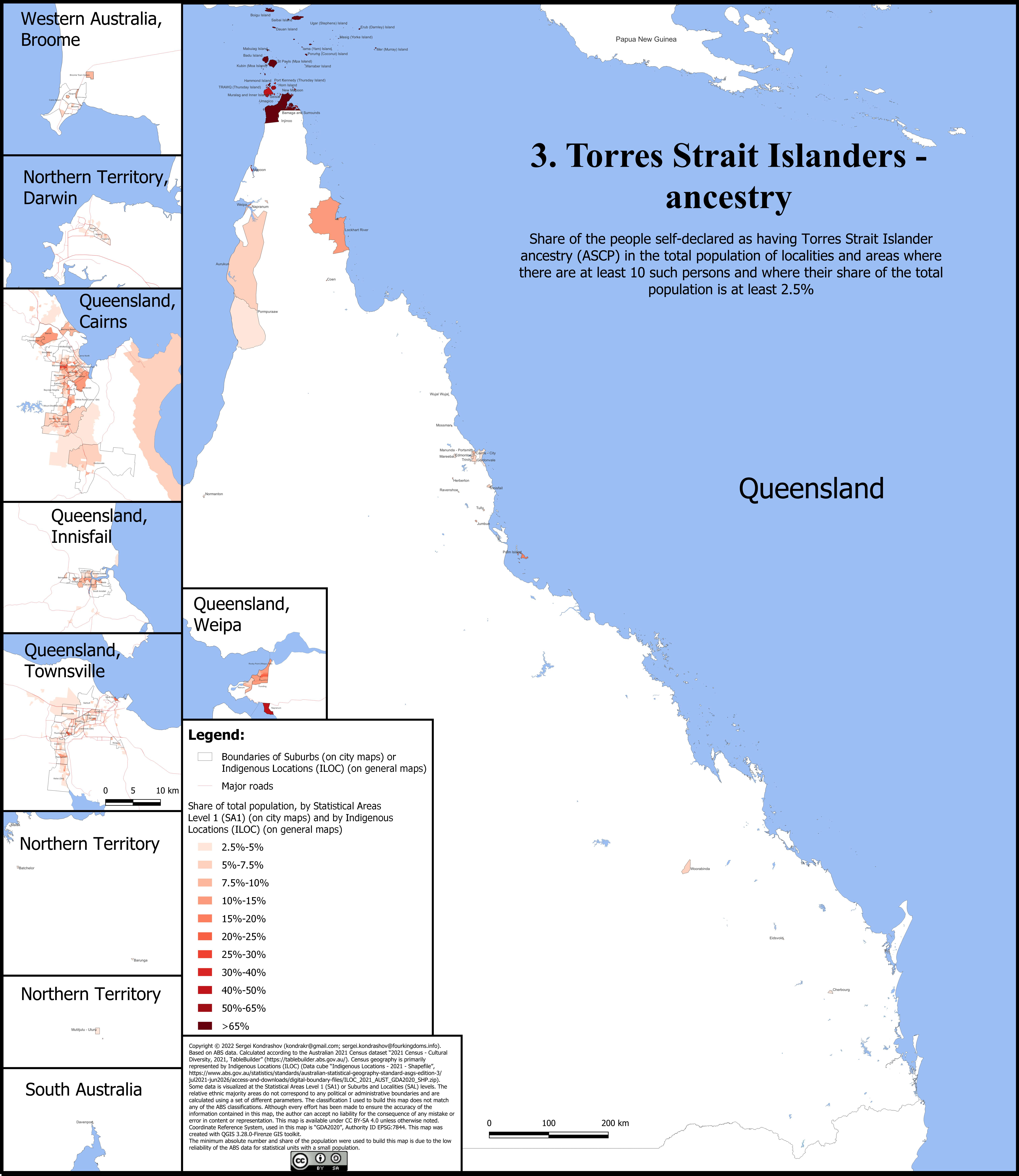
Geographical distribution of people with Torres Strait Islander ancestry

Of the 133 islands, only 38 are inhabited. The islands are culturally unique, with much to distinguish them from neighbouring Papua New Guinea, Indonesia and the Pacific Islands. Today the islands are multicultural, having attracted Asian and Pacific Island traders to the beche-de-mer, mother-of-pearl and trochus-shell industries over the years.

The 2021 Australian census counted 4,124 people living on the islands, of whom 86.7% were Torres Strait Islander or Aboriginal Australian people. (86.7% of the population identified as Torres Strait Islander; 16.9% as Aboriginal Australian; 2.3% as Australian; 1.8% as English, etc.). In 2006, the Australian Department of Foreign Affairs and Trade had reported 6,800 Torres Strait Islanders living in the Torres Strait area.

People who identified themselves as being of Torres Strait Islander descent in Australia as a whole in the 2021 census accounted for 4.2% (39,538) of those who identified themselves as being of Indigenous origin, while those with both Torres Strait Islander and Aboriginal ancestry made up a further 4.4% (42,516).

Five communities of Torres Strait Islanders and Aboriginal Australians live on the coast of mainland Queensland, mainly at Bamaga, Seisia, Injinoo, Umagico and New Mapoon in the Northern Peninsula area of Cape York.

In June 1875, a measles epidemic killed about 25% of the population, with some islands suffering losses of up to 80% of their people, as the islanders had no natural immunity to European diseases.

== Administration ==
Until the late 20th century, Torres Strait Islanders had been administered by a system of elected councils, a system based partly on traditional pre-Christian local government and partly on the introduced mission management system.

Today, the Torres Strait Regional Authority, an Australian government body established in 1994 and consisting of 20 elected representatives, oversees the islands, with its primary function being to strengthen the economic, social and cultural development of the peoples of the Torres Strait area.

Further to the TSRA, there are several Queensland LGAs which administer areas occupied by Torres Strait Islander communities:

- the Torres Strait Island Region, covering a large proportion of the Islands;
- the Northern Peninsula Area Region, administered from Bamaga, on the northern tip of Cape York; and
- the Shire of Torres, which governs several islands as well as portions of Cape York Peninsula, is effectively colocated with the Northern Peninsula Area Region, which covers a number of Deed of Grant in Trust areas on the peninsula, and the Torres Strait Island Region and administers those sections of its area which are not autonomous.

== Ethnicity ==
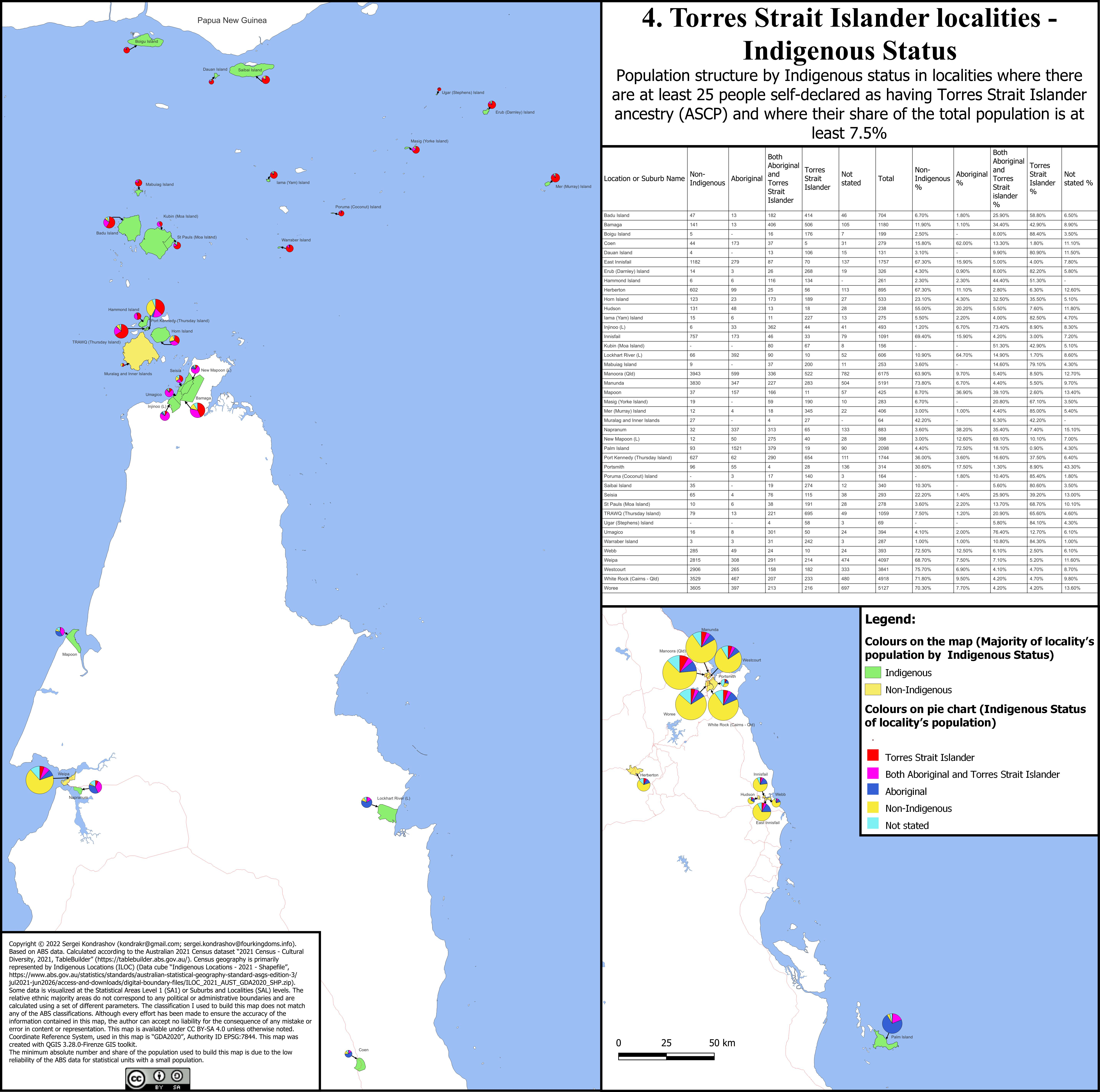
Indigenous Status of population in localities with significant share of Torres Strait islander population

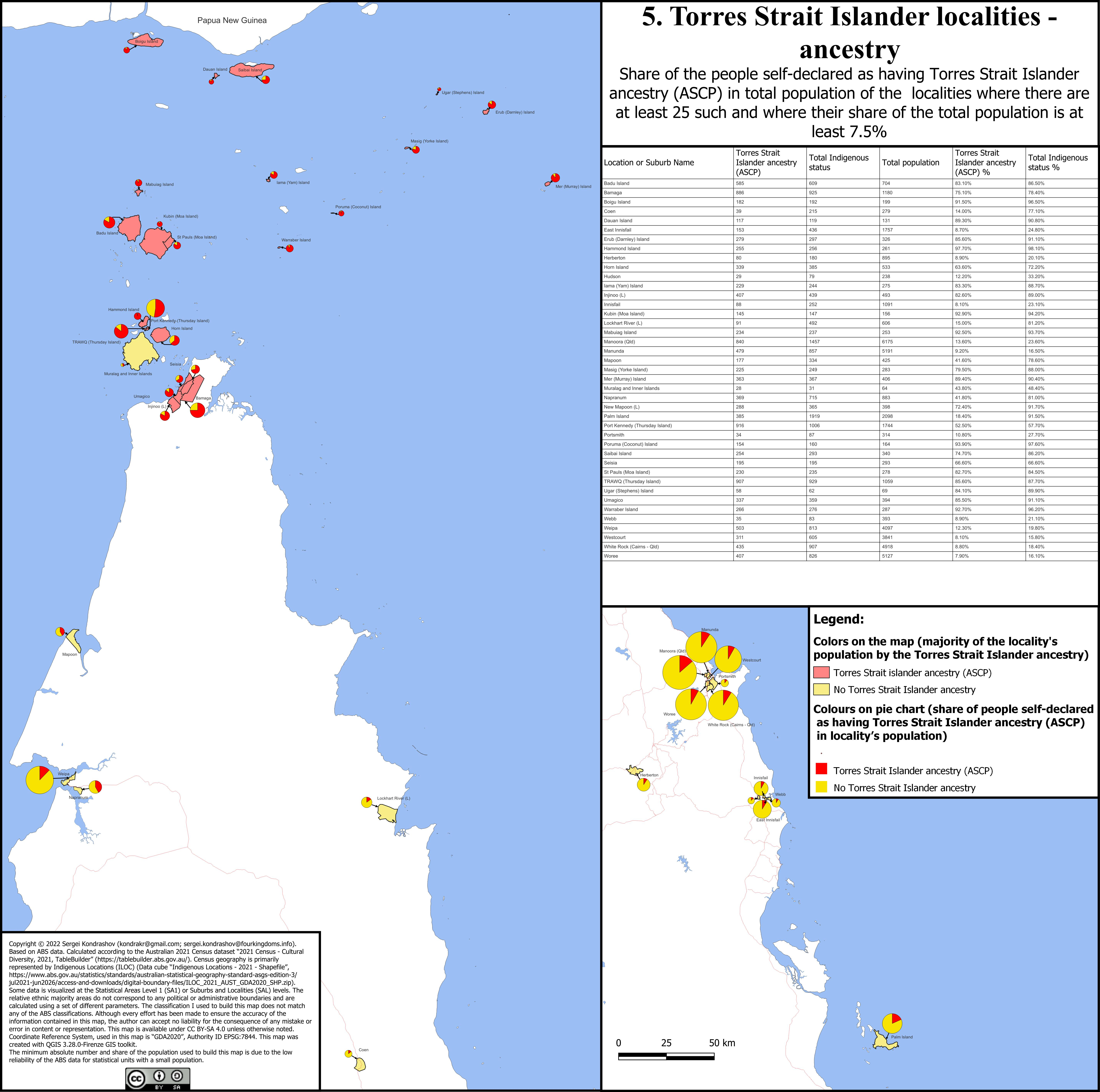
Ancestry of population in localities with significant share of Torres Strait islander population (Torres Strait Islander or other)

Torres Strait Islander people are of predominantly Melanesian descent, distinct from Aboriginal Australians on the mainland and some other Australian islands, and share some genetic and cultural traits with the people of New Guinea.

The five-pointed star on the national flag represents the five cultural groups. Another source says that it originally represented the five groups of islands, but today (as of 2001) it represents the five major political divisions.

Pre-colonial Island people were not a homogeneous group and until then did not regard themselves as a single people. They have links with the people of Papua New Guinea, several islands being much closer to PNG than Australia, as well as the northern tip of Cape York on the Australian continent.

Sources are generally agreed that there are five distinct geographical and/or cultural divisions, but descriptions and naming of the groups differ widely.

- Encyclopaedia Britannica: the Eastern (Meriam, or Murray Island), Top Western (Guda Maluilgal), Near Western (Maluilgal), Central (Kulkalgal), and Inner Islands (Kaiwalagal).
- Multicultural Queensland 2001 (a Queensland Government publication): five groups may be distinguished, based on linguistic and cultural differences, and also related to their places of origin, type of area of settlement, and long-standing relationships with other peoples. these nations are: Saibailgal (Top Western Islanders), Maluilgal (Mid-Western Islanders), Kaurareg (Lower Western Islanders), Kulkalgal (Central Islanders) and Meriam Le (Eastern Islanders).
- Torres Shire Council official website (Queensland Government): Five major island clusters – the Top Western Group (Boigu, Dauan and Saibai), the Near Western Group (Badu, Mabuiag and Moa), the Central Group (Yam, Warraber, Coconut and Masig), the Eastern Group (Murray, Darnley and Stephen), and the TI Group (Thursday Island, Tabar Island, Horn, Hammond, Prince of Wales and Friday).

Ethno-linguistic groups include:

- Badu people, based on the central-west Badu island
- Kaurareg, lower Western Islanders, based on the Muralag (Prince of Wales Island) group.
- Mabuiag (or Mabuygiwgal) people, across a number of the islands.
- Meriam people, who living on a number of inner eastern islands, including Murray Island (also known as Mer Island) and Tabar Island.

== Languages ==
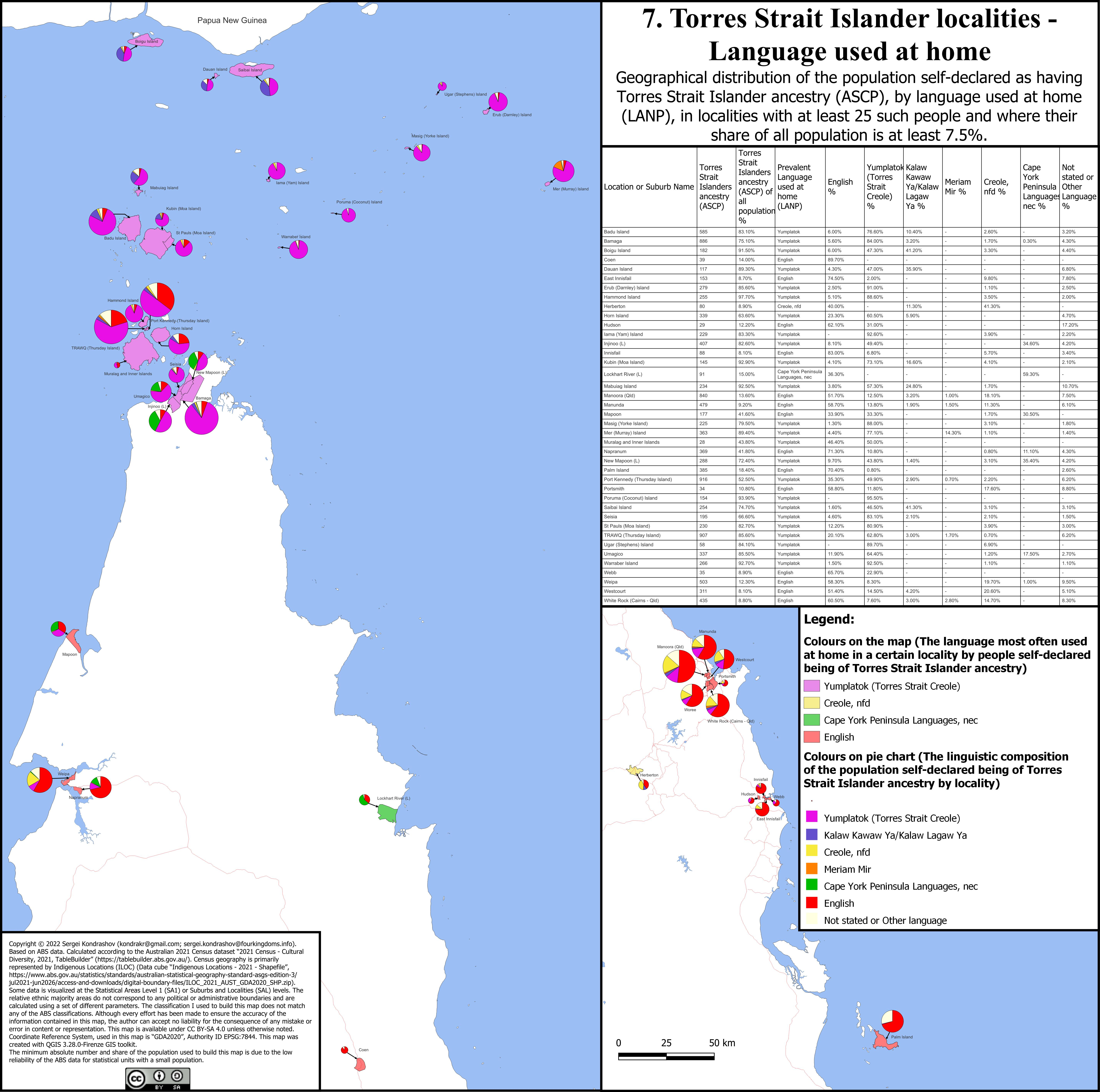
Languages used at home by Torres Strait Islanders in localities with significant share of Torres Strait islander population

There are two distinct Indigenous languages spoken on the Islands, as well as a creole language.

The Western-central Torres Strait Language, or Kalaw Lagaw Ya, is spoken on the southwestern, western, northern and central islands; a further dialect, Kala Kawa Ya (Top Western and Western) may be distinguished. It is a member of the Pama-Nyungan family of languages of Australia.

Meriam Mir is spoken on the eastern islands. It is one of the four Eastern Trans-Fly languages, the other three being spoken in Papua New Guinea.

Torres Strait Creole, an English-based creole language, is also spoken.

== Culture ==
Archaeological, linguistic and folk history evidence suggests that the core of Island culture is Papuo-Austronesian. The people have long been agriculturalists (evidenced, for example, by tobacco plantations on Aureed Island) as well as engaging in hunting and gathering. Dugong, turtles, crayfish, crabs, shellfish, reef fish and wild fruits and vegetables were traditionally hunted and collected and remain an important part of their subsistence lifestyle. Traditional foods play an important role in ceremonies and celebrations even when they do not live on the islands. Dugong and turtle hunting as well as fishing are seen as a way of continuing the Islander tradition of being closely associated with the sea. The islands have long history of trade and interactions with explorers from other parts of the globe, both east and west, which has influenced their lifestyle and culture.

The Indigenous people of the Torres Strait have a distinct culture which has slight variants on the different islands where they live. Cultural practices share similarities with Australian Aboriginal and Papuan culture. Historically, they have an oral tradition, with stories handed down and communicated through song, dance and ceremonial performance. As a seafaring people, sea, sky and land feature strongly in their stories and art.

=== Post-colonisation ===
Post-colonisation history has seen new cultural influences on the people, most notably the place of Christianity. After the "Coming of Light" (see below), artefacts previously important to their ceremonies lost their relevance, instead replaced by crucifixes and other symbols of Christianity. In some cases the missionaries prohibited the use of traditional sacred objects, and eventually production ceased. Missionaries, anthropologists and museums "collected" a huge amount of material: all of the pieces collected by missionary Samuel McFarlane, were in London and then split between three European museums and a number of mainland Australian museums.

In 1898–1899, British anthropologist Alfred Cort Haddon collected about 2,000 objects, convinced that hundreds of art objects collected had to be saved from destruction by the zealous Christian missionaries intent on obliterating the religious traditions and ceremonies of the native islanders. Film footage of ceremonial dances was also collected. The collection at Cambridge University is known as the Haddon Collection and is the most comprehensive collection of Torres Strait Islander artefacts in the world.

During the first half of the 20th century, Torres Strait Islander culture was largely restricted to dance and song, weaving and producing a few items for particular festive occasions. In the 1960s and 1970s, researchers trying to salvage what was left of traditional knowledge from surviving elders influenced the revival of interest in the old ways of life. An Australian historian, Margaret Lawrie, employed by the Queensland State Library, spent much time travelling the Islands, speaking to local people and recording their stories, which have since influenced visual art on the Islands.

=== Art ===
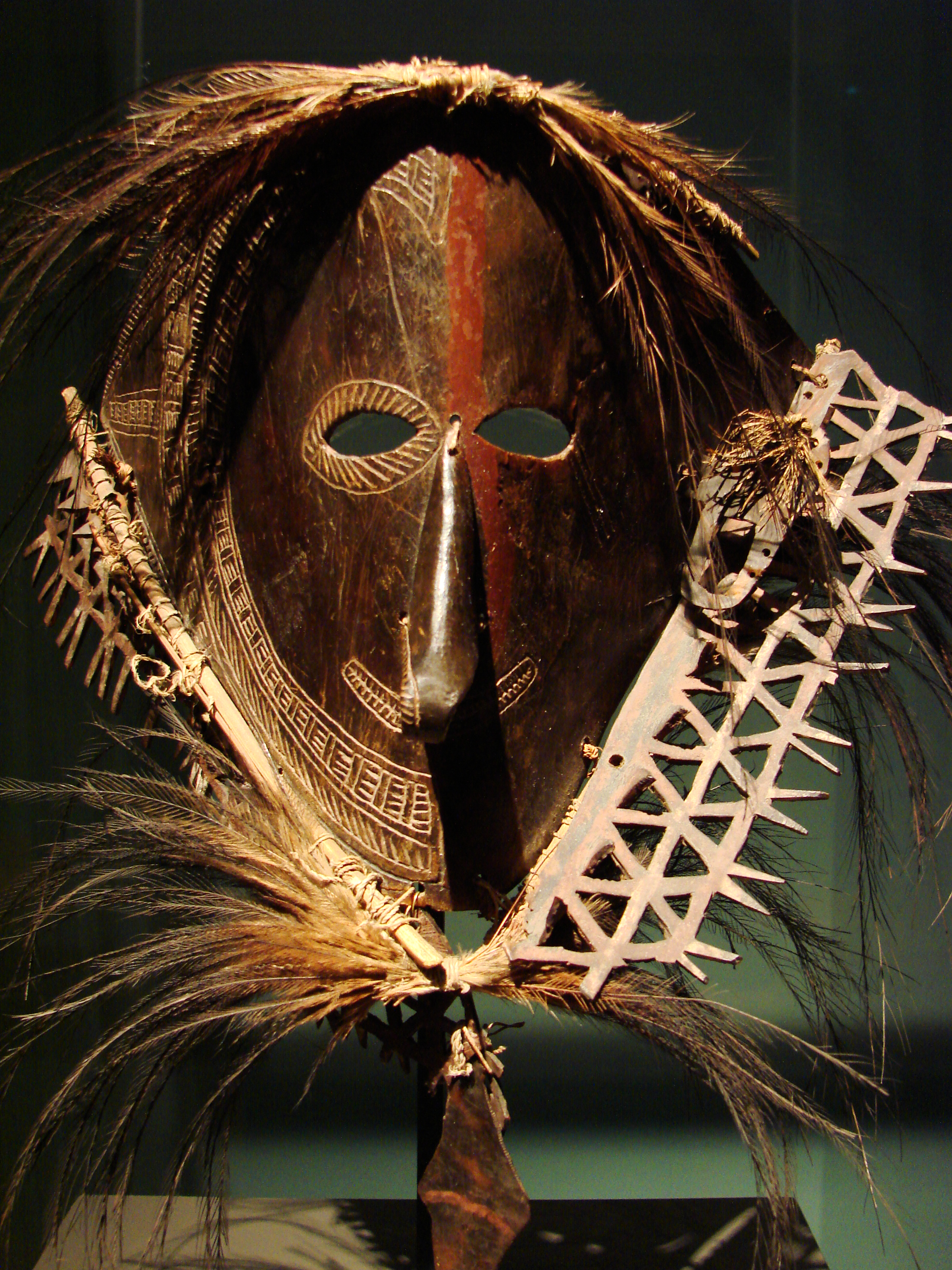
Ritual face mask from a Torres Strait Island (19th century)

Mythology and culture, deeply influenced by the ocean and the natural life around the islands, have always informed traditional artforms. Featured strongly are turtles, fish, dugongs, sharks, seabirds and saltwater crocodiles, which are considered totemic beings.

Torres Strait Islander people are the only culture in the world to make turtleshell masks, known as krar (turtleshell) in the Western Islands and le-op (human face) in the Eastern Islands.

Prominent among the artforms is wame (alt. wameya), many different string figures.

Elaborate headdresses or dhari (also spelt dari), as featured on the Torres Strait Islander flag, are created for the purposes of ceremonial dances.

The Islands have a long tradition of woodcarving, creating masks and drums, and carving decorative features on these and other items for ceremonial use. From the 1970s, young artists were beginning their studies at around the same time that a significant re-connection to traditional myths and legends was happening. Margaret Lawrie's publications, Myths and Legends of the Torres Strait (1970) and Tales from the Torres Strait (1972), reviving stories which had all but been forgotten, influenced the artists greatly. While some of these stories had been written down by Haddon after his 1898 expedition to the Torres Strait, many had subsequently fallen out of use or been forgotten.

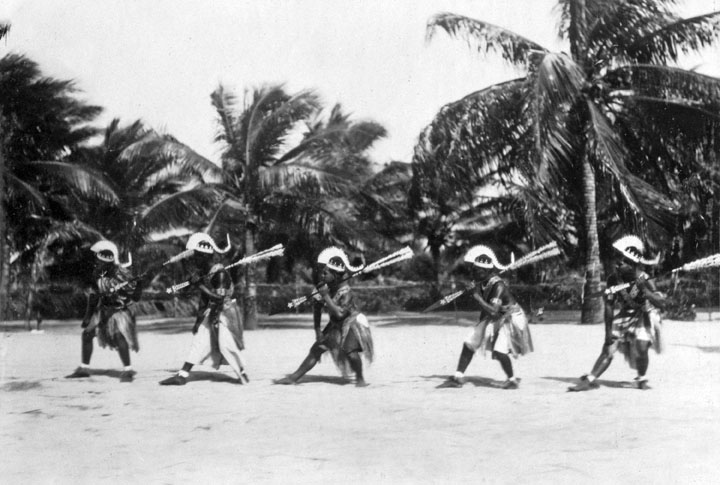
Torres Islanders dance on Yorke Island, 1931

In the 1990s a group of younger artists, including the award-winning Dennis Nona (b.1973), started translating these skills into the more portable forms of printmaking, linocut and etching, as well as larger scale bronze sculptures. Other outstanding artists include Billy Missi (1970–2012), known for his decorated black and white linocuts of the local vegetation and eco-systems, and Alick Tipoti (b.1975). These and other Torres Strait artists have greatly expanded the forms of Indigenous art within Australia, bringing Melanesian carving skills as well as new stories and subject matter. The College of Technical and Further Education on Thursday Island was a starting point for young Islanders to pursue studies in art. Many went on to further art studies, especially in printmaking, initially in Cairns, Queensland and later at the Australian National University in what is now the School of Art and Design. Other artists such as Laurie Nona, Brian Robinson, David Bosun, Glen Mackie, Joemen Nona, Daniel O'Shane and Tommy Pau are known for their printmaking work.

An exhibition of Alick Tipoti's work, titled Zugubal, was mounted at the Cairns Regional Gallery in July 2015.

=== Music and dance ===
For Torres Strait Islander people, singing and dancing is their "literature" – "the most important aspect of Torres Strait lifestyle. The Torres Strait Islanders preserve and present their oral history through songs and dances;...the dances act as illustrative material and, of course, the dancer himself is the storyteller" (Ephraim Bani, 1979). There are many songs about the weather; others about the myths and legends; life in the sea and totemic gods; and about important events. "The dancing and its movements express the songs and acts as the illustrative material".

Dance is also major form of creative and competitive expression. "Dance machines" (hand held mechanical moving objects), clappers and headdresses (dhari/dari) enhance the dance performances. Dance artefacts used in the ceremonial performances relate to Islander traditions and clan identity, and each island group has its own performances.

Artist Ken Thaiday Snr is renowned for his elaborately sculptured dari, often with moving parts and incorporating the hammerhead shark, a powerful totem.

Christine Anu is an ARIA Award-winning singer-songwriter of Torres Strait Islander heritage, who first became popular with her cover version of the song "My Island Home" (first performed by the Warumpi Band).

=== Sports ===
Sports are popular among Torres Strait Islanders and the community has many sporting stars in Australian and international sports. Sporting events bring together people from across the different islands and help to connect the Torres Strait with mainland Australia and Papua New Guinea. Rugby league is especially popular, including the annual 'Island of Origin' tournament between teams from different islands. Basketball is also extremely popular.

== Religion and beliefs ==
The people still have their own traditional belief systems. Stories of the Tagai, their spiritual belief system, represent Torres Strait Islanders as sea people, with a connection to the stars, as well as a system of order in which everything has its place in the world. They follow the instructions of the Tagai.

One Tagai story depicts the Tagai as a man standing in a canoe. In his left hand, he holds a fishing spear, representing the Southern Cross. In his right hand, he holds a sorbi (a red fruit). In this story, the Tagai and his crew of 12 were preparing for a journey, but before the journey began, the crew consumed all the food and drink they planned to take. So the Tagai strung the crew together in two groups of six and cast them into the sea, where their images became star patterns in the sky. These patterns can be seen in the star constellations of Pleiades and Orion.

Some Torres Strait Islander people share beliefs similar to the Aboriginal peoples' Dreaming and "Everywhen" concepts, passed down in oral history.

=== Oral history ===
One of the stories passed down in oral history tells of four brothers (bala) named Malo, Sagai, Kulka and Siu, who paddled their way up to the central and eastern islands from Cape York (Kay Daol Dai, meaning "big land"), and each established his own tribal following. Sagai landed at Iama Island (known as Yam), and after a time assumed a god-like status. The crocodile was his totem. Kulka settled on Aureed Island, and attained a similar status, as god of hunting. His totem was the fish known as gai gai (Trevally). Siu settled on Masig, becoming god of dancing, with the tiger shark (baidam) as his totem. The eldest brother, Malo, went on to Mer and became responsible for setting out a set of rules for living, a combination of religion and law, which were presented by Eddie Mabo in the famous Mabo native title case in 1992.

The cult of Kulka was in evidence on Aureed Island with the finding of a "skull house" by the rescuers of survivors two years after the wreck of Charles Eaton, in 1836.

=== Introduction of Christianity ===
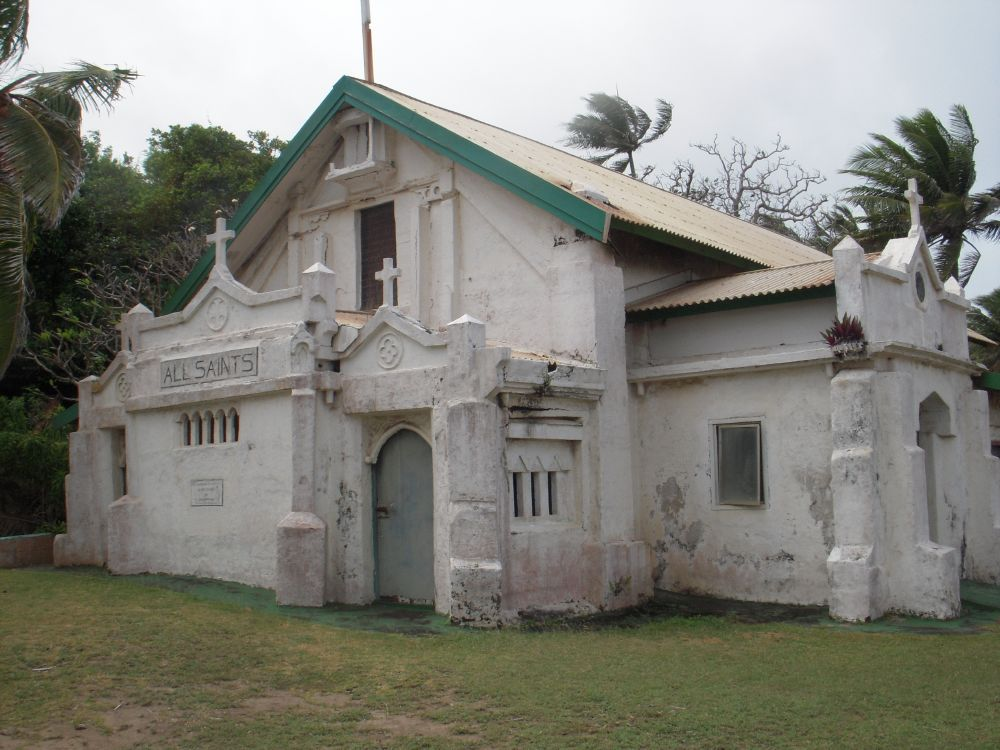
All Saints Anglican Church on Erub (Darnley Island)

From the 1870s, Christianity spread throughout the islands, and it remains strong today among Torres Strait Islander people everywhere. Christianity was first brought to the islands by the London Missionary Society (LMS) mission led by Rev. Samuel Macfarlane and Rev. Archibald Wright Murray, who arrived on Erub (Darnley Island) on 1 July 1871 on the schooner Surprise, a schooner (Note: Surprise, a schooner of 150 tons, was originally a French ship, acquired by a Sydney buyer around September 1868 at Circular Quay, having sailed there from Tahiti. It was chartered by Macfarlane and Murray under Captain Paget, leaving Lifu and Wave in the Loyalty Islands in May 1871. The ship, under Captain Brews, was wrecked in a gale on 2 February 1874 near Nobbys Head, off Newcastle, New South Wales.) chartered by the LMS. They sailed to the Torres Strait after the French Government had demanded the removal of the missionaries from the Loyalty Islands and New Caledonia in 1869. Eight teachers and their wives from Loyalty Islands arrived with the missionaries on the boat from Lifu.

Clan elder and warrior Dabad greeted them on their arrival. Ready to defend his land and people, Dabad walked to the water's edge when McFarlane dropped to his knees and presented the Bible to Dabad. Dabad accepted the gift, interpreted as the "Light", introducing Christianity to the Torres Strait Islands. The people of the Torres Strait Islands adopted the Christian rituals and ceremonies and continued to uphold their connection to the land, sea and sky, practising their traditional customs, and cultural identity referred to as Ailan Kastom.

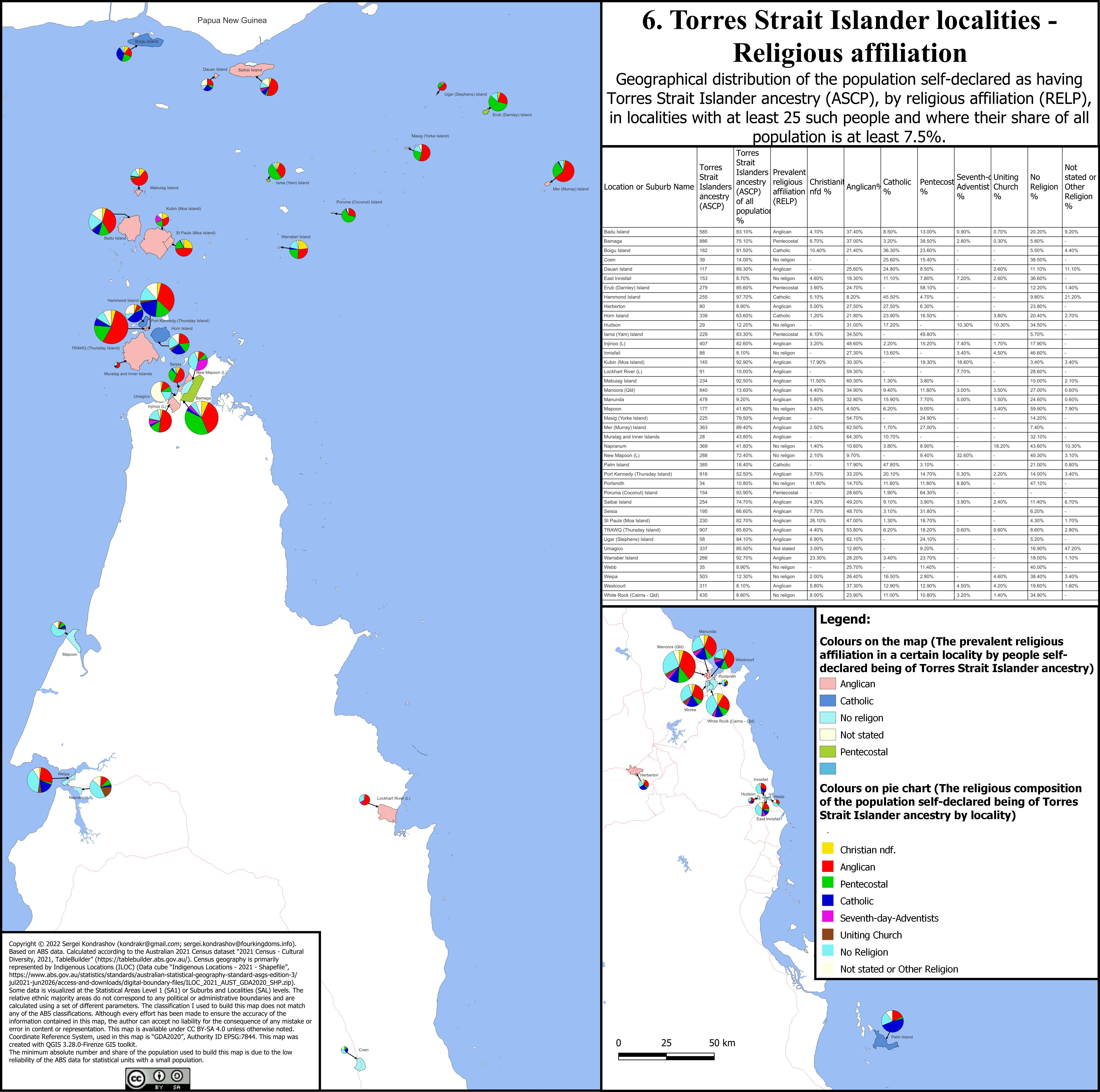
Religious affiliations of Torres Strait islanders in localities with significant share of Torres Strait islander population

The Islanders refer to this event as "The Coming of the Light", also known as Zulai Wan, or Bi Akarida, and all Island communities celebrate the annual Coming of the Light Festival on 1 July. Coming of the Light, an episode in the 2013 documentary television series Desperate Measures, features the annual event.

However the coming of Christianity did not spell the end of the people's traditional beliefs; their culture informed their understanding of the new religion, as the Christian God was welcomed and the new religion was integrated into every aspect of their everyday lives.

=== Religious affiliation, 2016 census ===
In the 2016 Census, a total of 20,658 Torres Strait Islander people (out of a total of 32,345) and 15,586 of both Torres Strait Islander and Aboriginal identity (out of 26,767) reported adherence to some form of Christianity. (Across the whole of Australia, the Indigenous and non-Indigenous population were broadly similar with 54% (vs 55%) reporting a Christian affiliation, while less than 2% reported traditional beliefs as their religion, and 36% reported no religion.)

== Traditional adoptions ==
A traditional cultural practice, known as kupai omasker, allows adoption of a child by a relative or community member for a range of reasons. The reasons differ depending on which of the many Torres Islander cultures the person belongs to, with one example being "where a family requires an heir to carry on the important role of looking after land or being the caretaker of land". Other reasons might relate to "the care and responsibility of relationships between generations".

There had been a problem in Queensland law, where such adoptions are not legally recognised by the state's Succession Act 1981, with one issue being that adopted children are not able to take on the surname of their adoptive parents. On 17 July 2020, the Queensland Government introduced a bill in parliament to legally recognise the practice. The bill was passed as the Meriba Omasker Kaziw Kazipa Act 2020 ("For Our Children's Children") on 8 September 2020.

== Notable people ==
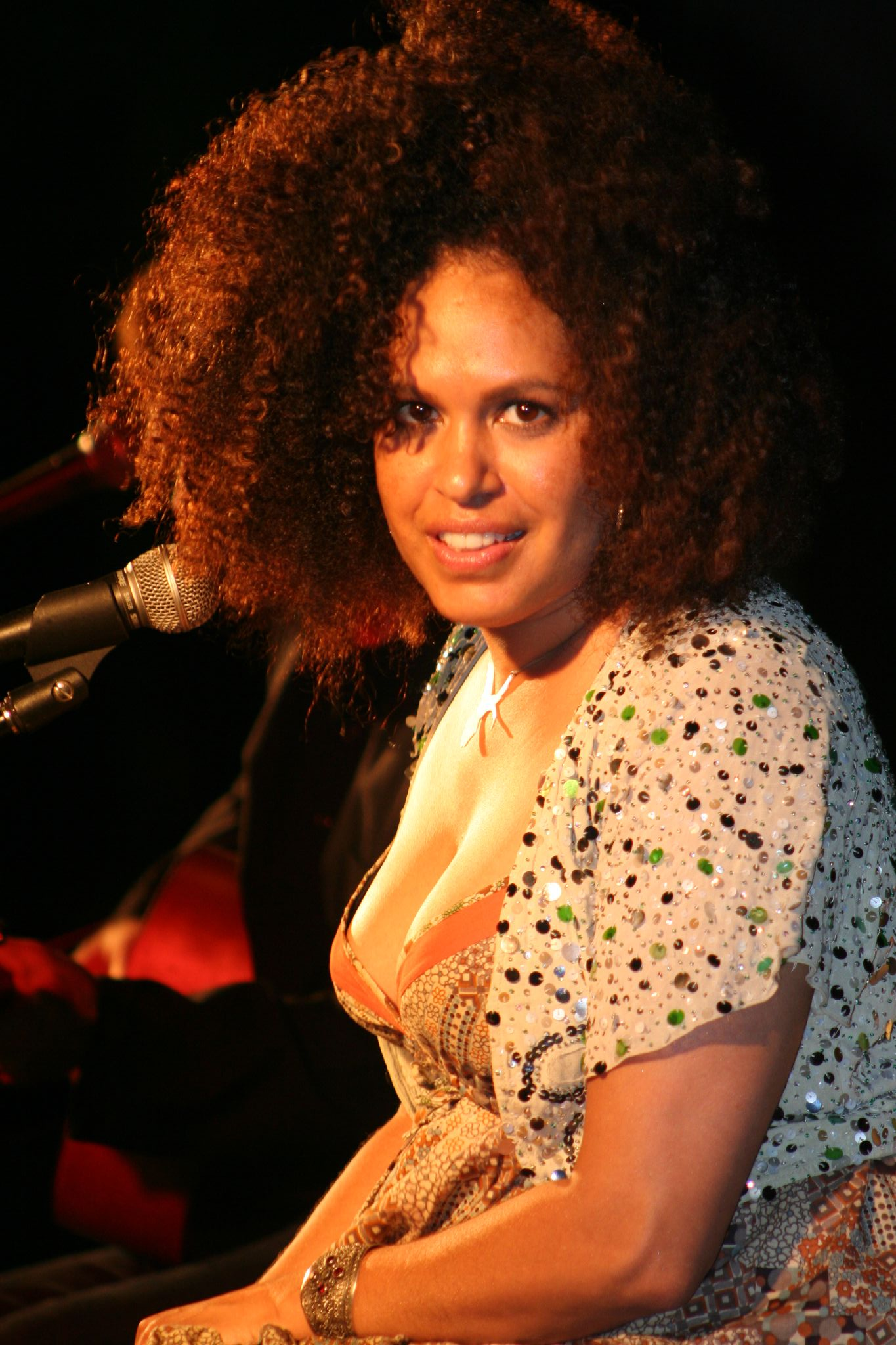
Singer Christine Anu, who performed at the 2000 Sydney Summer Olympics

=== Activism ===
- Ellie Gaffney, nurse, midwife, writer and Indigenous rights activist.
- Tanya Hosch, social activist based in Adelaide, South Australia
- Eddie Koiki Mabo, land rights campaigner who played a major role in a landmark decision which now characterises Australian law on land and title
- Sentah Sonny Leo Unmeopa, social activist and leader
- Muara (Lifu) Wacando, who was awarded a gold medal by the Royal Humane Society for her sea rescue during the 1899 Cyclone Mahina
- Elia Ware, soldier and activist

=== Arts ===
- Christine Anu, pop singer and actress, known for her song "My Island Home"
- Ken Thaiday Snr, artist based in Cairns
- Kaiit, neo soul singer, won the inaugural Best Soul/R&B Release category at the ARIA Music Awards of 2019 for their song "Miss Shiney"

=== Education ===
- Martin Nakata, the first Torres Islander PhD degree graduate (1998), proponent of Indigenous Standpoint Theory
- Vanessa Lee-AhMat, the first female Torres Strait Islander PhD graduate (2016) from Griffith University School of Medicine

=== Sports ===
==== Athletics ====
- Harry Mosby, 1976 Paralympian field athlete

==== American football ====
- Jesse Williams, 2014 Super Bowl winner

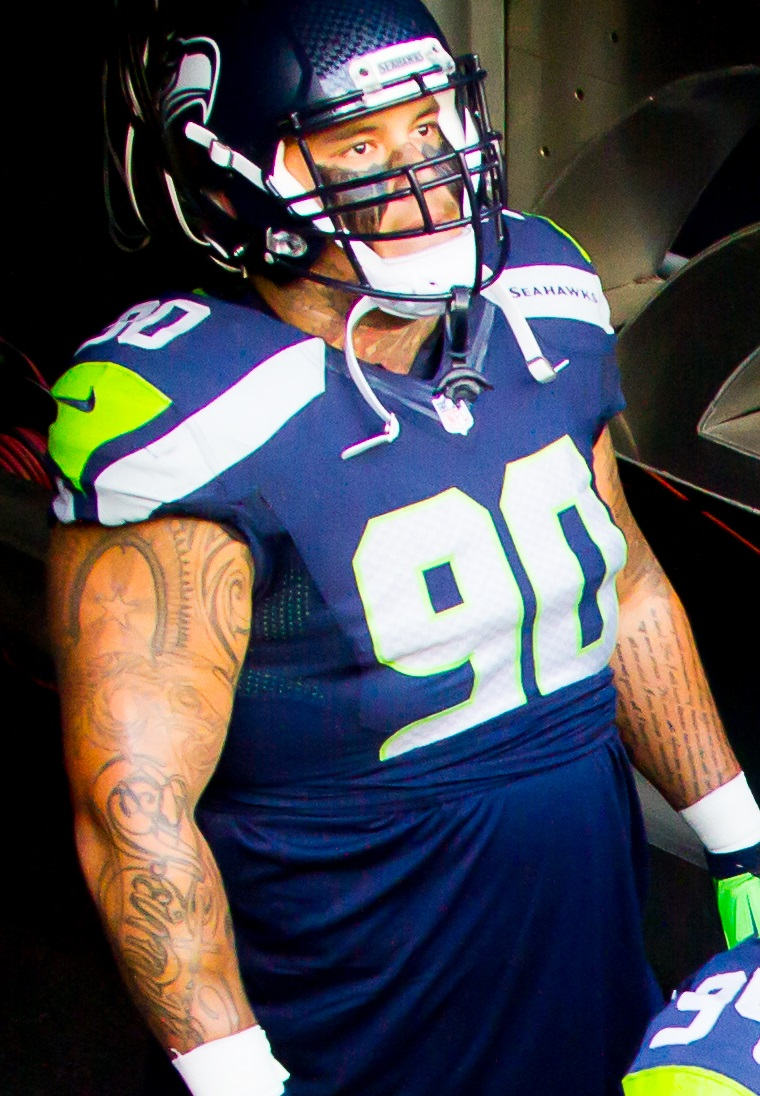
Jesse Williams, who won 2014 Super Bowl with the Seattle Seahawks

==== Australian rules football ====
- Robert Ahmat, Australian Football League player with Collingwood and Sydney
- Ben Davis, Australian Football League player with Adelaide
- Fabian Francis, Australian Football League player with Melbourne, Brisbane Bears, Port Adelaide
- Delma Gisu, AFLW player with Greater Western Sydney
- Alicia Janz, AFLW player with Fremantle
- Stevie-Lee Thompson, AFLW player with Adelaide
- Andrew McLeod, Australian Football League player for Adelaide and Australian Football Hall of Famer
- Sam Powell-Pepper, Australian Football League player for Port Adelaide
- Albert Proud, Australian Football League player for Brisbane Lions
- Heidi Talbot, AFLW player for Gold Coast
- Peter Ware, WAFL premiership winning footballer with Swan Districts and AFL Queensland Hall of Famer.

==== Rugby League ====
- Dane Gagai, Australian National Rugby League player for the Newcastle Knights
- Alex Johnston, Australian National Rugby League player for the South Sydney Rabbitohs
- Gehamat Shibasaki, Australian National Rugby League player for the Brisbane Broncos
- Jamal Shibasaki, Australian National Rugby League player for the North Queensland Cowboys
- Sam Thaiday, Australian National Rugby League player for the Brisbane Broncos
- Hamiso Tabuai-Fidow, Australian National Rugby League player for the Dolphins

==== Basketball ====
- Michael Ah Matt, 1964 Olympic basketballer
- Nathan Jawai, basketball player
- Will McDowell-White, basketball player with Pallacanestro Varese and the Australian Boomers
- Patty Mills, NBA champion (2014, San Antonio Spurs) and captain for the Australian Boomers first Olympic medal win
- Danny Morseu, 1980 and 1984 Olympic basketballer

==== Soccer ====
- Frank Farina, former international soccer player for Australia
- Allira Toby, soccer player in the W-League.

==== Politics ====
- Cynthia Lui, the first Torres Strait Islander elected to the Parliament of Queensland

==== Religion ====
- Kwami Dai, Assistant Bishop in the Anglican Diocese of Carpentaria
- Ted Mosby, Assistant Bishop in the Anglican Diocese of North Queensland

==== Other ====
- Kapiu Masi Gagai, pearler, boatman and mission worker who served in World War II

== See also ==
- Aboriginal Centre for the Performing Arts
- Australian frontier wars
- Blue Water Empire
- Indigenous health in Australia
- List of Indigenous Australian firsts
- Papuan people
- Pearl hunting § Australia
- Torres Strait 8, relating to climate change and the Australian Government
