= Kwami Dai =

Kwami Dai was the first Torres Strait Islander bishop of the Anglican Church of Australia, licensed as an assistant bishop in the Diocese of Carpentaria.

Dai served as bishop to the Torres Strait Islanders people of northern Queensland and all Australia from his consecration in 1986.
