= Nggem language =

Language in Indonesia

Nggem
- Native to: Indonesia
- Region: Highland Papua: Mamberamo Tengah Regency
- Ethnicity: Nggem
- Native speakers: 4,400 (2005)
- Language family: Trans–New Guinea: West Trans–New Guinea; Irian Highlands ?; Dani languages; Dani proper; Nggem

Language codes
- ISO 639-3: nbq
- Glottolog: ngge1241

Nggem is a Baliem Valley language spoken in the Indonesian province of Highland Papua by the Nggem people of Central Mamberamo.

== Name ==
Nggem refers both to the language as well as the people, used as both an endonym by the people themselves and as an exonym by neighbouring tribes.

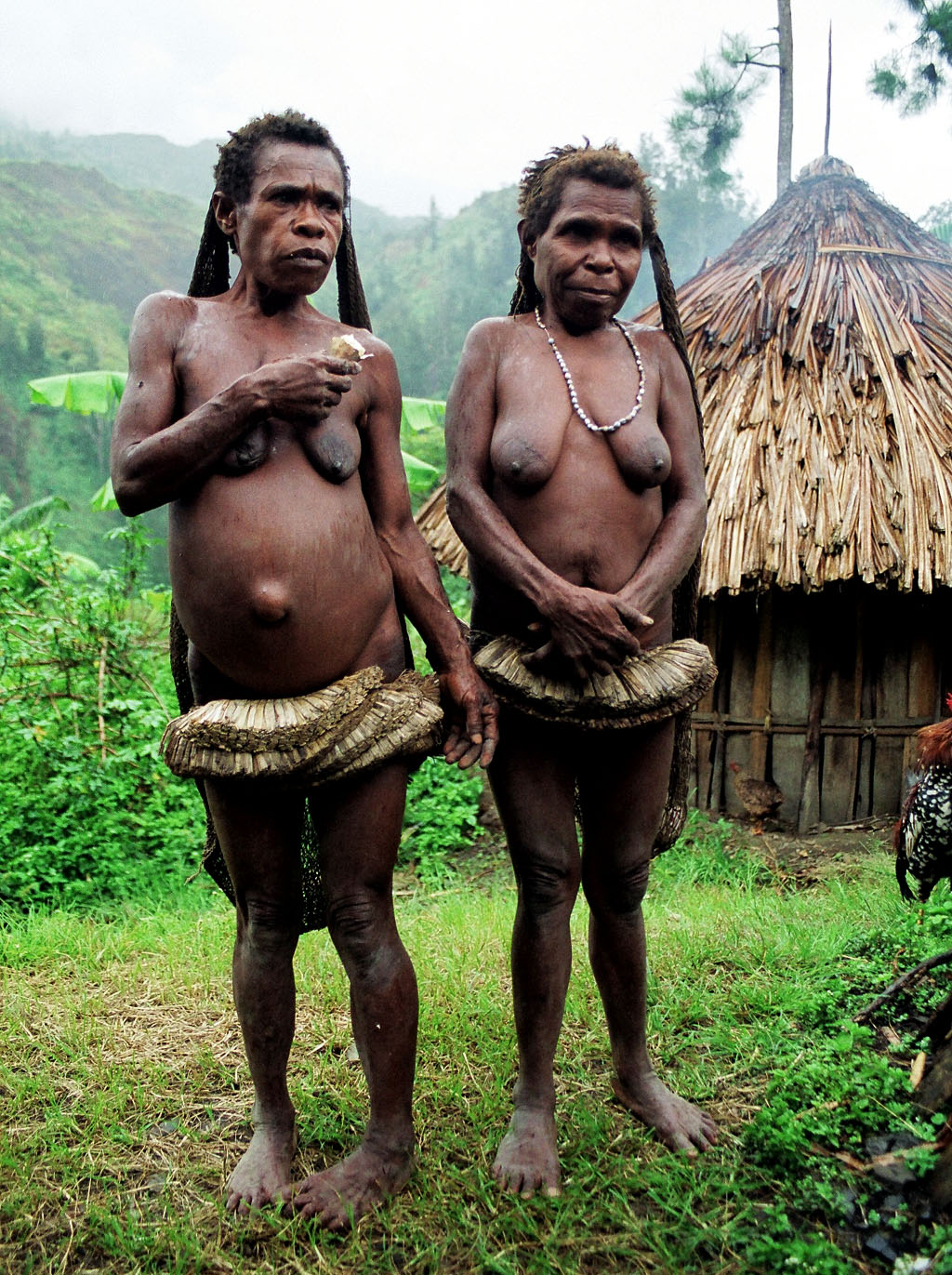
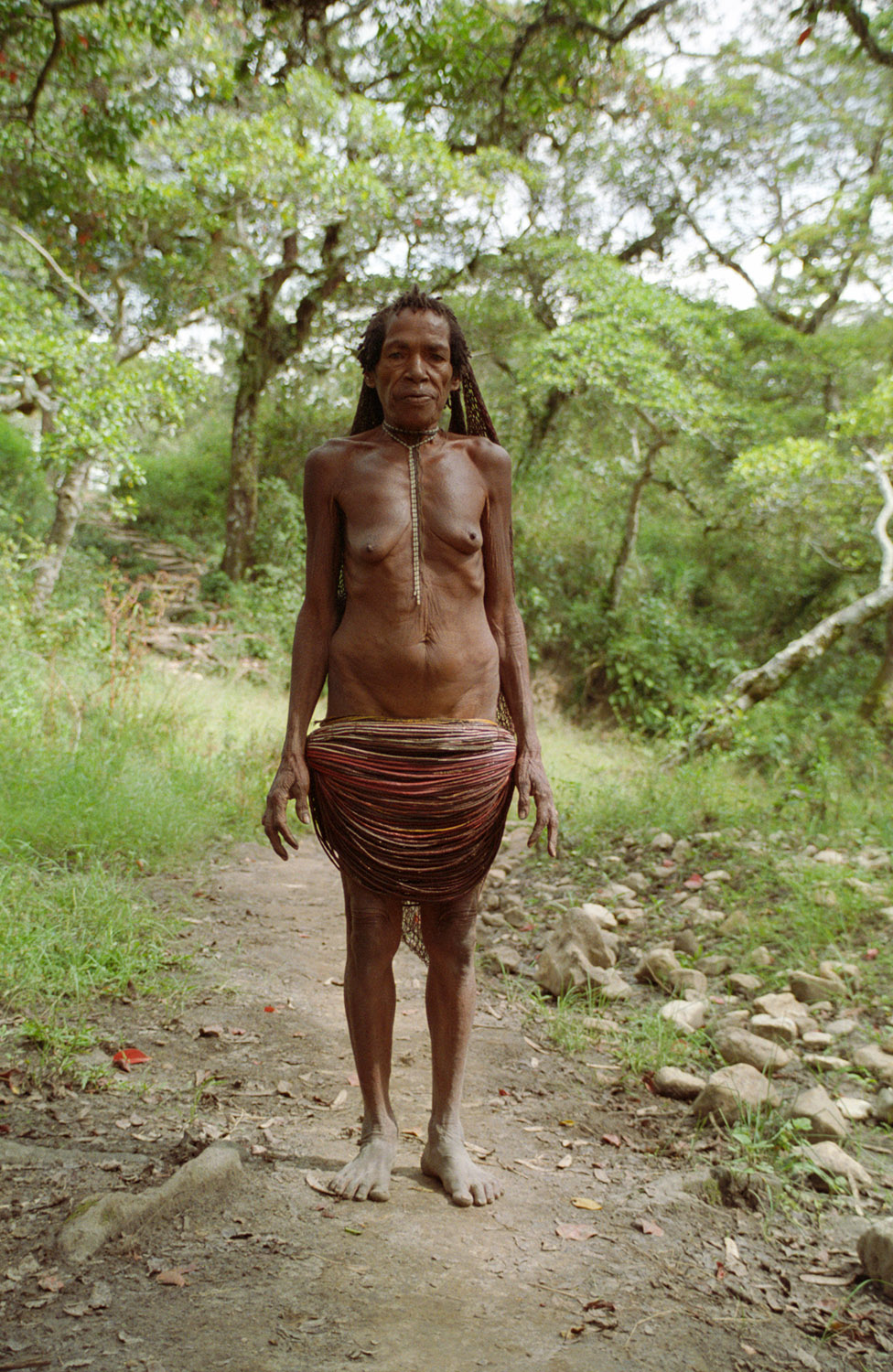
difference of nggem (left) and yonggal (right)

The language's name comes from the noun nggem, referring to a grass skirt covering the buttocks and pubic area, the style of dress formerly worn by Nggem women. Nggem people refer to other language groups by the name of the style of women's traditional clothing; for example, yonggal "string skirt" refers to the Dani people.

In the neighbouring Western Dani language, nggem is a derogatory term meaning "thief".

== Phonology ==
=== Consonants ===
The following table shows Nggem's consonantal phonemes:

		Bilabial	Alveolar	Velar
Plosive	Pre-nasalized	ᵐb	ⁿd	ᵑɡ
Plosive	Voiceless	p	t	k
Plosive	Implosive	ɓ	ɗ	
Sibilant			s	
Lateral			l	
Nasal		m	n	
Semivowel		w	y	

=== Vowels ===
The following table shows Nggem's vowel phonemes:

	Front	Central	Back
High	i		u
Mid	e		o
Low		a	
