= Papuans =

Papuans may refer to:

- Indonesian Papuans – the Native Indonesians of Papua-origin
- Papua New Guineans – the nationals of Papua New Guinea
- Indigenous people of New Guinea
